= 2025 European Championship of American football =

16th IFAF European Championship in American football

Tournament details
- Host nation: Europe
- Dates: 12 October 2024 – 28 October 2025
- No. of nations: 12

Final positions
- Champions: Austria
- Runner-up: Finland
- Third-place: Italy

The 2025 European Championship was the 17th European Championship in American football. The preliminary round was played around Europe from early October to early November 2024. The final round was played in August and October 2025.

== Level 1, first round ==
The first round was played around Europe between 12 and 27 October 2024. It saw 12 teams divided to four groups.

Group A	Group B	Group C	Group D
Austria (1)	Finland (2)	Italy (3)	Sweden (4)
Serbia (8)	France (7)	Denmark (6)	Great Britain (5)
Hungary (9)	Czech Republic (10)	Switzerland (11)	Germany (12)

=== Group A ===
Team	W	L	Pct	PF	PA	PD
Austria	2	0	1.000	136	3	+133
Hungary	1	1	0.500	28	77	-49
Serbia	0	2	0.000	19	103	-84

Quarter	1	2	3	4	Total
Austria	21	10	14	13	58
Hungary	0	3	0	0	3

at Budapest Rugby Center, Budapest

- Date: 12 October 2024
- Game time: 14:00 CEST

Quarter	1	2	3	4	OT	Total
Hungary	14	0	3	2	6	25
Serbia	7	0	6	6	0	19

at Rusanda Stadium, Melenci

- Date: 19 October 2024
- Game time: 15:00 CEST

Quarter	1	2	3	4	Total
Serbia	0	0	0	0	0
Austria	24	19	14	21	78

at American Football Zentrum, Salzburg

- Date: 27 October 2024
- Game time: 13.00 CEST

=== Group B ===
Team	W	L	Pct	PF	PA	PD
Finland	2	0	1.000	38	15	+23
Czech Republic	1	1	0.500	20	35	-15
France	0	2	0.000	16	24	-8

Quarter	1	2	3	4	Total
Finland	0	21	0	7	28
Czech Republic	0	6	0	0	6

at Městský stadion, Ústí nad Labem

- Date: 13 October 2024
- Game time: 13:00 CEST

Quarter	1	2	3	4	Total
Czech Republic	0	0	0	14	14
France	0	0	7	0	7

at Stadium Lille Métropole, Villeneuve-d'Ascq

- Date: 20 October 2024
- Game time: 14:00 CEST
- Game attendance: 3500

Quarter	1	2	3	4	Total
France	0	6	0	3	9
Finland	0	3	0	7	10

at Vantaa

- Date: 26 October 2024
- Game time: 11:30 CEST

=== Group C ===
Team	W	L	Pct	PF	PA	PD
Italy	2	0	1.000	73	27	+46
Denmark	1	1	1.000	54	35	+19
Switzerland	0	2	0.000	7	72	-65

Quarter	1	2	3	4	Total
Italy	13	23	9	0	45
Switzerland	0	0	0	0	0

at Stadion Lachen, Thun

- Date: 12 October 2024
- Game time: 18:00 CEST

Quarter	1	2	Total
Switzerland	7		7
Denmark	27		27

at Gentofte Sportspark, Gentofte

- Date: 19 October 2024
- Game time: 16:00 CEST

Quarter	1	2	3	4	Total
Denmark	7	6	14	0	27
Italy	7	7	7	7	28

at Velodromo Vigorelli, Milan

- Date: 26 October 2024

=== Group D ===
Team	W	L	Pct	PF	PA	PD
Germany	2	0	1.000	91	17	+74
Sweden	1	1	0.500	26	61	-35
Great Britain	0	2	0.000	30	69	-39

Quarter	1	2	3	4	Total
Great Britain	7	0	6	6	19
Sweden	0	10	10	0	20

at Sola Arena, Karlstad

- Date: 13 October 2024
- Game time: 15:00 CEST

Quarter	1	2	3	4	Total
Germany	7	14	14	14	49
Great Britain	3	0	0	8	11

at Butts Park Arena, Coventry

- Date: 19 October 2024

Quarter	1	2	3	4	Total
Sweden	0	0	0	6	6
Germany	7	14	14	7	42

at Grotenburg-Stadion, Krefeld

- Date: 26 October 2024
- Game time: 17:00
- Game attendance: 3000

== Level 1, final stage ==
The final round was played on 2–3 August, and the European Final Four was played in Krefeld, Germany, 25–28 October 2025.

=== 1–4 ===
Semifinals
1	Austria	30
12	Germany	9
2	Finland	9
3	Italy	8

Finals
1	Austria	27
2	Finland	0
Third place
3	Italy	17
4	Germany	14

=== 5–8 ===
Placement 5–8
4	Sweden	0
10	Czech Republic	13
6	Denmark	30
9	Hungary	28

5th place game
10	Czech Republic	23
6	Denmark	0
7th place game
4	Sweden	13
9	Hungary	6

=== 9–12 ===
Switzerland folded the tackle football team in the end of 2024. France folded tackle football in January 2025.

Placement 9–12
5	Great Britain	NA
11	Switzerland	NA
7	France
8	Serbia

9th place game
5	Great Britain

== Level 2 ==
3 teams participate for the level 2 competition, 3 games will be played in 2024. The winner will be promoted to Level 1.

- 19 October 2024: Ireland – Netherlands 18-13
- 3 November 2024: Turkey – Ireland 41-18
- 17 November 2024: Netherlands – Turkey 0-3

== Legacy ==
The two-year run of the IFAF European Men's Tackle Championship may be best known for the collapse of leading programs during and after the competition.

The return of Germany to the top tier of IFAF European competition was short-lived. With the 0-2 record at the European Final Four they hosted which reulted in a fourth-place finish, coupled with a last-place finish in the Gridiron Nations Championship, the American Football Association of Germany (AFVD) withdrew its men's national team from the IFAF European Championship cycle for 2026 and 2027, citing financial constraints and internal restructuring. The AFVD is focusing on domestic development, separating itself from IFAF.

The SWE3 Federation withdrew the Swedish men's national American football team from the IFAF 2026–2027 European Championship due to severe financial constraints shortly after the competition. A 100% cut in elite sport funding from the Swedish Sports Federation for 2026 forced this decision, resulting in a halt to the team's participation in international tournaments.

2018 European champion France shut down its senior men’s tackle national team in early 2025 in the middle of the competition, after French American football lost its “high-level sport” recognition from the Federal Ministry. In a March 2025 interview, FFFA president Frédéric Paquet says the status was lost “officially since January 2, 2025,” and links that to both the closure of the Pôles and the disappearance of the national tackle teams due to lack of funding. The lack of an IFAF World Championship was also cited.

Also, Switzerland effectively withdrew its men’s tackle national team from the IFAF European Championship mid-tournament when the SAFV announced in December 2024 that it was suspending all tackle national teams “for the time being.” The stated reasons were a strategic shift toward flag football with LA 2028 in view, plus a review of results and cost structure. Switzerland is the only team of the four folded during the 2024-25 Championship to have restarted their program for the 2026-27 European cycle.

== See also ==
- International Federation of American Football
