= Luke Zahradka =

American football player (born 1991)

Personal information
- Born: July 4, 1991 (age 35) Franklin Square, New York, U.S.
- Height: 6 ft 5 in (196 cm)
- Weight: 236 lb (107 kg; 16 st 12 lb)
- Football career

Profile
- Position: Quarterback

Career information
- High school: H. Frank Carey (Franklin Square, New York)
- College: Bentley (2009–2012)

Career history
- Kirchdorf Wildcats (2013); Amiens Spartiates (2014); Ancona Dolphins (2015); Prague Black Panthers (2016); Milano Seamen (2017–2023); Frankfurt Galaxy (2024); Legnano Frogs (2025)

Awards and highlights
- Czech League champion (2016); 3x Italian League champion (2017–2019); Italian Bowl MVP (2017, 2019); European Champion (2021); European Championship MVP (2021)
Medal record
Representing Italy
Men's American football
Gridiron Nations Championship
Silver medal – second place	2025 Europe	Team
European Championship
Gold medal – first place	2021 Europe	Team
Bronze medal – third place	2023 Europe	Team
Bronze medal – third place	2025 Europe	Team
Men's flag football
World Games
Silver medal – second place	2022 Birmingham	Team
World Championship
Silver medal – second place	2026 Düsseldorf	Team
European Championship
Gold medal – first place	2025 Paris	Team

Luke Zahradka (born July 4, 1991) is an American football and flag football player who plays as a quarterback. He played college football for Bentley. Born in the United States, he has represented Italy internationally in both American football and flag football.

In American football, Zahradka played for seven different teams in his professional career, winning four league titles, all in Europe. He has represented Italy at the European Championship, winning gold in 2021 and a bronze medal in 2023 and 2025. In flag football, he also represents Italy, winning gold at the 2025 European Championship and a silver medal at the 2022 World Games and 2026 World Championship.

== Early life ==
Zahradka attended H. Frank Carey High School in his hometown of Franklin Square, New York, where he played football, baseball, basketball and dodgeball. He attended Bentley University, where he played with its football team.

== Professional career ==
Zahradka subsequently moved to Europe, where his first stop was the Kirchdorf Wildcats of German Football League 2 in 2013. The following year he moved to the Amiens Spartiates in France. In 2015, he played in the Italian Football League for the first time and played with the Ancona Dolphins. He spent the 2016 season with the Prague Black Panthers of the ČLAF, where he won his first league championship.

In 2017, Zahradka began playing with the Milano Seamen. With the Seamen, he won three consecutive Italian championships from 2017 and 2019, and Zahradka himself was named the Italian Bowl MVP in 2017 and 2019. He joined the European League of Football (ELF) with the Seamen in 2023. After that season, he moved to the Frankfurt Galaxy, where he replaced veteran quarterback Jakeb Sullivan. His last team was with the Legnano Frogs in 2025.

== National team career ==
=== American football ===
In 2016, Zahradka, who also holds Italian citizenship, was first called up to the Italy national team. With them, he won the 2021 European Championship. He also won a bronze medal with them in the 2023 and 2025 editions.

Zahradka took part in the 2025 Gridiron Nations Championship, where he led the Italian team to the silver medal, finishing behind Canada.

=== Flag football ===
In flag football, Zahradka was part of the Italy national team at the 2022 World Games held in Birmingham, Alabama, where his team won silver. In September, he was appointed Global Flag Football ambassador by the IFAF and the NFL.

In 2025, Zahradka took part in the IFAF Men's European Flag Football Championship and helped Italy win the gold medal. This led his team to qualify for the 2026 IFAF Men's Flag Football World Championship in Düsseldorf, where they qualified for the flag football tournament of the 2028 Summer Olympics in Los Angeles by virtue of being a finalist. They finished second and lost to the United States in the final.
