= International Federation of American Football =

International sport governing body

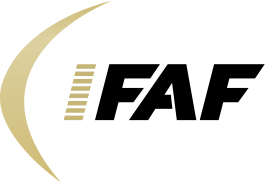
- Abbreviation: IFAF
- Formation: 1998; 28 years ago
- Type: Sports federation
- Legal status: Governing body of American football
- Headquarters: Lausanne, Switzerland (until 2025 Paris, France)
- Region served: Worldwide
- Members: 78 members (August 2025)
- President: (France) Pierre Trochet
- Vice president: (Canada) Jim Mullin
- General secretary: (United States) Eric Mayes
- Key people: Managing director (United Kingdom) Andy Fuller
- Main organ: Congress
- Affiliations: ARISF
- Website: americanfootball.sport

The International Federation of American Football (IFAF) is the international governing body of American football associations. The IFAF oversees the organization and promotion of all international competitions across both contact and non contact versions of the game, including the IFAF World Championship, which is held every four years. The IFAF became a provisionary member of SportAccord in 2003, and became a full SportAccord member in 2005. In 2023, IFAF was officially recognized as an Olympic IF (International Federation) by the IOC. In 2023, IFAF marked a historic new streak, with flag football being selected as one of the five new sports for the 2028 Summer Olympics in Los Angeles. The organization's head office relocated to Lausanne, Switzerland, in 2026.

== IFAF Purpose and Mission ==
IFAF Purpose and mission includes the following:

- Promotion of the game and the provision of educational and innovative resources for the football community to help strengthen the growth of American Football for people of all ages, background and abilities.
- Organization and promotion of all amateur international competitions across both contact and non contact versions of the game.
- Recognition and support of national federations as they develop the game in their respective countries.
- regulation of the game on and of the field of play through oversight of its rules.
- Representation of the global game to international partners, be they sporting organizations, federation or commercial interest.

== Structure and organization ==
The IFAF recognizes in their respective areas the following branches and has 78 as of August 2025:

- IFAF Africa: 11
- IFAF Americas: 18
- IFAF Asia: 13
- IFAF Europe: 30 (European Championship of American football)
- IFAF Oceania: 6

== Members ==
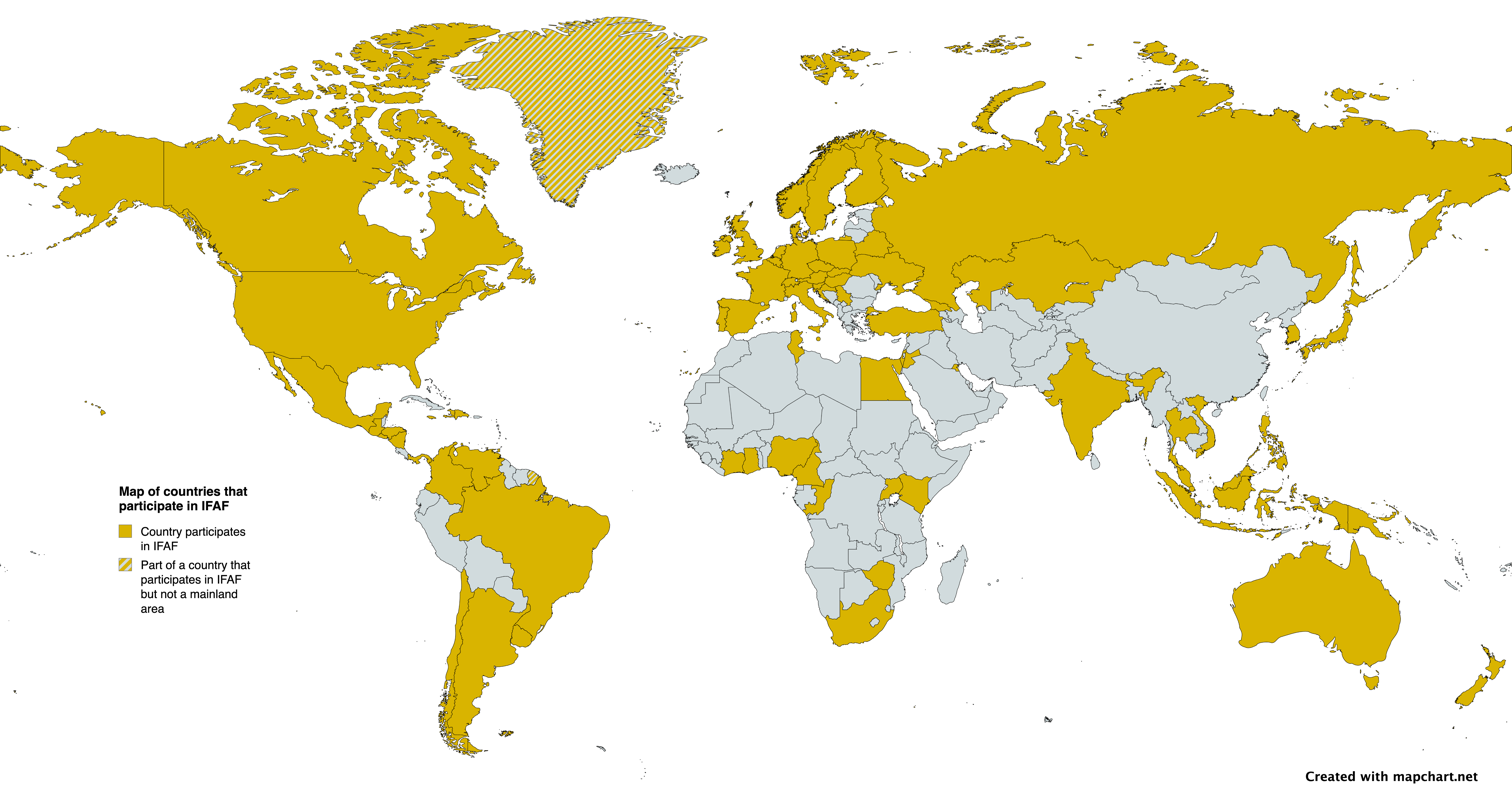
Map of countries that participate in the IFAF as of August 2025.

Africa (11)
- Cameroon
- Congo
- Egypt
- Ghana
- Ivory Coast
- Kenya
- Nigeria
- South Africa
- Tunisia
- Uganda
- Zimbabwe

Americas (18)

- Argentina
- Brazil
- Canada
- Chile
- Colombia
- Dominican Republic
- El Salvador
- Guatemala
- Haiti
- Honduras
- Jamaica
- Mexico
- Nicaragua
- Panama
- Trinidad and Tobago
- United States
- Uruguay
- Venezuela

Asia (14)

- Hong Kong
- India
- Indonesia
- Israel
- Japan
- Jordan
- Kazakhstan
- Kuwait
- Malaysia
- Philippines
- Singapore
- South Korea
- Thailand
- Vietnam

Europe (29)

- Austria
- Belarus
- Belgium
- Croatia
- Czech Republic
- Denmark
- Finland
- France
- Georgia
- Germany
- Great Britain
- Hungary
- Ireland
- Italy
- Luxembourg
- Malta
- Netherlands
- Norway
- Poland
- Portugal
- Russia
- Serbia
- Slovakia
- Slovenia
- Spain
- Sweden
- Switzerland
- Turkey
- Ukraine

Oceania (6)

- American Samoa
- Australia
- New Caledonia
- New Zealand
- Papua New Guinea
- French Polynesia

== Variants ==
1. Tackle football
2. Flag football: 40 minutes with two halves of 20 minutes
3. Wheelchair football: Indoors or outdoors
4. Beach flag football: 4 players - 25-yard field - 30 minutes with two halves of 15 minutes

== Competitions ==
American football competitions

Men

- IFAF World Championship of American Football
- World University American Football Championship (FISU / IFAF)
- World Games (IWGA / IFAF)

Junior

- IFAF U-20 World Championship

Women

- IFAF Women's World Championship

Flag football competitions

Men / Women

- IFAF Flag Football World Championship
- World Games Flag Football (IWGA / IFAF)

== Governance ==
=== President ===
Pierre Trochet (France) was elected President of IFAF in December 2021. He was re-elected unopposed for his second and final term in December 2024.

==== Former presidents ====
- Eiji Sasada (Japan): 1998–1999
- Frederic Paquet (France): 1999–2006
- Tommy Wiking (Sweden): 2006–2015
- Mac Kaneuji (Japan): 2015 (interim)
- Roope Noronen (Finland): 2015–2016
- Richard MacLean (Canada): 2016–2021

== Governance controversy and schism ==
Following the cancellation of the 2015 IFAF World Championship in Sweden for financial reasons, the event was moved to the United States. In February 2015, Tommy Wiking resigned as president of IFAF due to the event's cancellation before being reinstalled in the position. One group in New York had elected Roope Noronen as interim president in September 2014, followed by Richard MacLean in 2015. Another group, based in Paris, recognized Wiking as president.

In September 2016, the Paris IFAF suspended six nations—the United States, Japan, Canada, Mexico, Finland, and Denmark—for not submitting player information for anti-doping. A group of European federations wished for a reunification of the sport during a December 2016 meeting in Rome. In May 2017, after a split that created rival groupings of the International Federation of American Football, the IFAF party in Paris stripped its recognition of USA Football, citing disputes over anti-doping enforcement. IFAF Paris instead recognized the United States Federation of American Football as the USA's governing body, and the USFAF organized a team to participate in the 2017 World Games, in which it won a bronze medal. The grouping of the IFAF based in New York continued to recognize USA Football and organized the 2017 Women's World Championships, which the USA won.

In March 2018, the Court of Arbitration for Sport (CAS) determined that the IFAF in New York was the proper governing entity and voided all decisions of the other IFAF entity, including their decision to strip USA Football of its recognition. USA Football is currently the internationally recognized governing body for American football in the United States.

== See also ==
- American football at the Summer Olympics
- Canadian Football League
- Gridiron football
- IFAF Flag Football World Championship
- IFAF Junior World Championship
- List of American and Canadian football leagues
- NFL
- NFL Europe
