= 2023 European Championship of American football =

16th European Championship in American football

Tournament details
- Host nation: Europe
- Dates: 8 October 2022 – October 2023
- No. of nations: 11

Final positions
- Champions: Austria
- Runner-up: Finland
- Third-place: Italy

The 2023 European Championship was the 16th European Championship in American football. The preliminary round was played around Europe from 8 October to 5 November 2022. The final round was played in August and October 2023.

Austria won the European Championship title after defeating Finland, 28–0, in the final. Austria wide receiver Philipp Haun was named the MVP of the game after catching three touchdowns.

== Group A, first round ==
The first round was played around Europe from 8 October to 5 November 2022. It saw 11 teams divided to four groups. Russia was due to be the 12th nation participating as the 3rd team in group 1 but the nation was removed from the tournament due to ongoing Russian invasion of Ukraine. Russia's games were removed from the schedule.

A	B	C	D
Italy (1)	Sweden (2)	Finland (3)	France (4)
Great Britain (8)	Serbia (7)	Denmark (6)	Austria (5)
~~Russia (9)~~	Switzerland (10)	Czech Republic (11)	Hungary (12)

=== Division A ===
Team	W	L	Pct	PF	PA	PD
Italy	1	0	1.000	28	23	+5
Great Britain	0	1	0.000	23	28	-5

Quarter	1	2	3	4	Total
Italy	7	14	0	7	28
Great Britain	7	9	0	7	23

at Velodromo Vigorelli, Milan, Italy

- Date: 30 October 2022
- Game time: 3:00 PM
- Game weather: Sunny 22 °C (72 °F)
- Game attendance: 1050
- Referee: Marco Sala
- Recap Boxscore

=== Division B ===
Team	W	L	Pct	PF	PA	PD
Sweden	2	0	1.000	52	20	+32
Serbia	1	1	0.500	38	34	+4
Switzerland	0	2	0.000	19	55	-36

Quarter	1	2	3	4	Total
Serbia	0	0	7	7	14
Sweden	7	0	7	7	21

at Behrn Arena, Örebro, Sweden

- Date: 8 October 2022
- Game time: 6:00 PM
- Game weather: Crisp 6 °C (43 °F)
- Game attendance: 942
- Referee: J Kaya
- Recap Statistics

Game information
First quarter
- 01:33 SWE - E Almeida 7 yd pass from P Juhlin (R G Miranda kick), 4-59 2:07, SER 0 - SWE 7

Third quarter

- 05:52 SWE - S Diakiti 0 yd blocked punt return (R G Miranda kick), SER 0 - SWE 14
- 05:35 SER - P Bajalica 68 yd pass from D Obradinovic (Z Stegnjaja kick), 1-68 0:11, SER 7 - SWE 14

Fourth quarter

- 09:26 SWE - S Diakiti 0 yd interception return (R G Miranda kick), SER 7 - SWE 21
- 01:26 SER - J Ikic 14 yd pass from D Obradinovic (Z Stegnjaja kick), 8-40 3:30, SER 14 - SWE 21

Quarter	1	2	3	4	Total
Sweden	6	13	0	12	31
Switzerland	6	0	0	0	6

at Stadion Rankhof, Basel, Switzerland

- Date: 16 October 2022
- Game time: 2:00 PM
- Game weather: Sunny 6 °C (43 °F)
- Game attendance: 200
- Recap Statistics

Game information
First quarter
- 11:39 SUI - J Falk 33 yd interception return (C Cordey pass failed), SWE 0 - SUI 6
- 08:27 SWE - A Jallai 57 yd pass from P Juhlin (R G Miranda kick failed), 5-70 3:12, SWE 6 - SUI 6

Second quarter

- 07:26 SWE - O Lundberg 5 yd run (R G Miranda kick), 13-73 6:49, SWE 13 - SUI 6
- 00:11 SWE - K Borzsei 12 yd pass from T Nilsson (R G Miranda kick failed), 2-70 0:17, SWE 19 - SUI 6

Fourth quarter

- 07:23 SWE - A Jallai 17 yd pass from T Nilsson (P Juhlin pass failed), 11-67 4:52, SWE 25 - SUI 6
- 06:50 SWE - B Prasopsin 29 yd interception return (T Nilsson rush failed), SWE 31 - SUI 6

Quarter	1	2	3	4	Total
Switzerland	0	7	6	0	13
Serbia	0	10	7	7	24

at Sports Center Pampas, Kragujevac, Serbia

- Date: 23 October 2022
- Game time: 2:00 PM

=== Division C ===
Team	W	L	Pct	PF	PA	PD
Finland	2	0	1.000	102	23	+79
Denmark	1	1	0.500	58	100	–42
Czech Republic	0	2	0.000	50	87	–37

Quarter	1	2	3	4	Total
Denmark	0	0	13	0	13
Finland	6	21	13	20	60

at Myyrmäen jalkapallostadion, Vantaa, Finland

- Date: 8 October 2022
- Game time: 2:00 PM
- Game weather: Cloudy with rain 13 °C (55 °F)
- Game attendance: 365
- Referee: Veikko Lamminsalo
- Recap

Game information

First quarter

- FIN – Mikko Seppänen 8 yd pass from Ambro Urjansson (Markus Ojainväli pass failed), 06:35 Finland 6–0. Drive: 8 plays, 79 yards, 3:11

Second quarter

- FIN – Johannes Jauhiainen 28 yd pass from Ambro Urjansson (Santtu Vehkomäki pass from Ambro Urjansson), 09:33 Finland 14–0. Drive: 6 plays, 65 yards, 2:10.
- FIN – Tuukka Lehtonen 11 yd run (Markus Ojainväli kick), 04:03. Finland 21–0. Drive: 7 plays, 76 yards, 2:32
- FIN – Iiro-Pekka Paakki 8 yd pass from Ambro Urjansson (Santtu Vehkomäki pass intercepted), 00:47 Finland 27–0. Drive: 3 plays, 45 yards, 0:29.

Third quarter

- DEN – Simon Fons 31 yd pass from Alexander Bjerre (Kasper Sørensen kick), 11:45. Finland 27–7. Drive: 1 play, 31 yards, 0:07.
- FIN – Lassi Pajarinen 6 yd run (Aleksi Pulkkinen kick), 10:37. Finland 34–7. Drive: 5 plays, 76 yards, 1:08.
- DEN – Jens Jensen 42 yd pass from Alexander Bjerre (Kasper Sørensen kick failed), 08:47. Finland 34–13. Drive: 5 plays, 49 yards, 1:43.
- FIN – Kimi Linnainmaa 32 yd pass from Ambro Urjansson (Aleksi Pulkkinen kick blocked), 05:09. Finland 40–13. Drive: 8 plays, 79 yards, 3:31.

Fourth quarter

- FIN – Micky Kyei 38 yd pass from Ambro Urjansson (Aleksi Pulkkinen kick failed), 11:50. Finland 46–13. Drive: 5 plays, 71 yards, 1:50.
- FIN – Johannes Jauhiainen 23 yd pass from Ambro Urjansson (Aleksi Pulkkinen kick), 06:50. Finland 53–13. Drive: 8 plays, 69 yards, 2:59.
- FIN – Lassi Pajarinen 38 yd run (Aleksi Pulkkinen kick), 04:09. Finland 60–13. Drive: 4 plays, 56 yards, 1:14.

Top passers

- DEN – Alexander Bjerre – 16/33, 248 yards, 2 TD, INT
- FIN – Ambro Urjansson – 21/32, 404 yards, 6 TD

Top rushers

- DEN – Magnus Nørgaard – 10 rushes, 41 yards
- FIN – Tuukka Lehtonen – 12 rushes, 82 yards, TD

Top receivers

- DEN – Simon Fons – 6 receptions, 133 yards, TD
- FIN – Kimi Linnainmaa – 5 receptions, 117 yards, TD

Quarter	1	2	3	4	Total
Finland	0	14	21	7	42
Czech Republic	0	10	0	0	10

at Městský stadion, Usti, Czech Republic

- Date: 16 October 2022
- Game time: 1:00 PM
- Game weather: Cloudy 21 °C (70 °F)
- Game attendance: 720
- Referee: Michal Rosíval
- Recap

Game information

First quarter

Second quarter

- FIN – Tuukka Lehtonen 3 yd pass from Ambro Urjansson (Aleksi Pulkkinen kick), 07:14. Finland 7–0. Drive: 7 plays, 89 yards, 2:43.
- CZE – Pavel Mráz 7 yd run (Petr Cermák kick), 04:40. Tied 7–7. Drive: 6 plays, 65 yards, 2:41.
- FIN – Kimi Linnainmaa 57 yd pass from Ambro Urjansson (Aleksi Pulkkinen kick). 02:40. Finland 14–7. Drive: 4 plays, 73 yards, 1:59.
- CZE – Petr Cermák 40 yd field goal, 00:00. Finland 14–10. Drive: 4 plays, 2 yards, 1:12.

Third quarter

- FIN – Santtu Vehkomäki 21 yd pass from Ambro Urjansson (Aleksi Pulkkinen kick), 09:46. Finland 21–10. Drive: 6 plays, 71 yards, 2:18.
- FIN – Mikko Seppänen 4 yd pass from Ambro Urjansson (Aleksi Pulkkinen kick), 03:39. Finland 28–10. Drive: 9 plays 40 yards, 4:10.
- FIN – Johannes Jauhiainen 10 yd pass from Ambro Urjansson (Aleksi Pulkkinen kick), 01:08. Finland 35–10. Drive: 3 plays, 10 yards, 1:19.

Fourth quarter

- FIN – Elmeri Laalo 67 yd interception return (Aleksi Pulkkinen kick), 03:34. Finland 42–10.

Top passers

- FIN – Ambro Urjansson – 16/27, 260 yards, 5 TD
- CZE – Michal Stoklasek – 7/18, 86 yards, 4 INT

Top rushers

- FIN – Tom Suoste – 9 rushes, 40 yards
- CZE – Jakub Brezina – 14 rushes, 90 yards

Top receivers

- FIN – Kimi Linnainmaa – 5 receptions, 117 yards, TD
- CZE – Vojtech Masita – 3 receptions, 56 yards

Quarter	1	2	3	4	Total
Czech Republic	7	7	6	20	40
Denmark	14	14	3	14	45

at Gentofte Sportspark, Gentofte, Denmark

- Date: 29 October 2022
- Game time: 2:00 PM
- Recap

=== Division D ===
Team	W	L	Pct	PF	PA	PD
Austria	2	0	1.000	76	7	+69
France	1	1	0.500	16	37	-21
Hungary	0	2	0.000	2	50	-48

Quarter	1	2	3	4	Total
Austria	11	17	0	7	35
France	0	0	0	7	7

at Stade Pierre Delort, Marseille, France

- Date: 9 October 2022
- Game time: 2:00 PM
- Game attendance: 2000
- Recap AT Recap FR

Quarter	1	2	3	4	Total
Hungary	0	0	0	0	0
Austria	7	3	17	14	41

at Sportplatz Donaufeld, Vienna, Austria

- Date: 23 October 2022
- Game time: 1:00 PM
- Game weather: Cloudy 15 °C (59 °F)
- Game attendance: 1432
- Recap Statistics

Quarter	1	2	3	4	Total
France	0	6	0	3	9
Hungary	0	2	0	0	2

at Budapest Rugby Center, Budapest, Hungary

- Date: 5 November 2022
- Game time: 1:30 PM
- Game attendance: 2270
- Referee: Endre Breznay
- Recap HU Recap FR

== Group A, final stage ==
The final round was played on 5–6 August and 28–29 October 2023. Games involving Russia were not played.

=== 1–4 ===
Semifinals
1	Italy	14
5	Austria	24
2	Sweden	14
3	Finland	33

Finals
5	Austria	28
3	Finland	0
Third place
1	Italy	26
2	Sweden	7

=== 5–8 ===
Placement 5–8
6	Denmark	13
7	Serbia	6
4	France	6
8	Great Britain	7

5th place game
6	Denmark	22
8	Great Britain	30
7th place game
4	France	47
7	Serbia	0

=== 9–12 ===
Placement 9–11
10	Czech Republic	15
11	Switzerland	0
9	Russia	NA
12	Hungary	NA

9th place game
10	Czech Republic	0
12	Hungary	30

=== Finals ===
5th place game

Quarter	1	2	3	4	Total
Great Britain	0	7	10	13	30
Denmark	0	0	7	15	22

at Gentofte Sportspark, Gentofte, Denmark

- Date: 28 October 2023
3rd place game

Quarter	1	2	3	4	Total
Italy	7	9	7	3	26
Sweden	0	0	0	7	7

at Valhalla IP, Gothenburg, Sweden

- Date: 28 October 2023
- Game time: 3:00 PM
- Game attendance: 1421
- Referee: Wickham
- Recap Statistics
Final

Quarter	1	2	3	4	Total
Finland	0	0	0	0	0
Austria	0	7	7	14	28

at NV Arena, Sankt Pölten, Austria

- Date: 28 October 2023
- Game time: 3:00 PM
- Game attendance: 6400
- Statistics

== Group B ==
Round 1
22 October 2022
Spain	26
Ireland	7
Israel	NA
Turkey	NA

Round 2
6 August 2023
Spain	23
Israel	30

Final
postponed
Germany
Israel

- 16th place game: Ireland – Turkey 14:17

== See also ==
- International Federation of American Football
