= 2018 European Championship of American football =

Tournament details
- Host nation: Finland
- Dates: 29 July – 4 August 2018
- No. of nations: 6

Final positions
- Champions: France
- Runner-up: Austria
- Third-place: Finland

Tournament statistics
- Attendance: 10,001 (Avg. ~1,111 per game)
- MVP of the tournament: (France) QB Paul Durand

The 2018 European Championship was the 14th European Championship in American football. The final tournament was played in Vantaa, Finland from 29 July to 4 August 2018.

== Qualification ==
The Qualification for the European Championship 2018 was held in three stages. In the first round, twelve teams played a single playoff round. The six winners and two further teams played the second round, in two tournaments of four teams. Another two teams entered the qualification in the third round in playoff games against the two tournament winners of the second round. Four teams were already qualified for the European Championship 2018. Altogether an all-time record number of twenty teams competed to win the European title in 2018. One team, Germany, did not play a single game due to the national federation of American Football in Germany having an unresolved dispute with IFAF.

=== First round ===
The first round was played from August to October 2015. Six of the twelve teams took part in one of the tournaments of the last championship. These were the seeded teams playing against an unseeded team. The seeded teams were the hosts of their playoff game. Israel defeating Spain was the only unseeded team to make it to the next round.

Date	Kickoff	Away	Score	Home	Game site
30 August	12:00 p.m. CEST	Israel	28–20	Spain	Estadio Santo Domingo, Alcorcón
26 September	6:00 p.m. CEST	Slovakia	0–21	Switzerland	Stadion Rankhof, Basel
10 October	1:00 p.m. CEST	Norway	0–20	Russia	Tsarskoye Selo Stadium, Pushkin
10 October	2:00 p.m. CEST	Hungary	0–56	Serbia	Voždovac Stadium, Belgrade
11 October	2:00 p.m. CEST	Poland	7–14	Czech Republic	Letní stadion, Pardubice
24 October	6:00 p.m. CEST	Belgium	3–17	Netherlands	Mandemakers Stadion, Waalwijk

=== Second round ===
The second round tournaments were played in 2016. As runner-up and third in the B Group Tournament in 2013, Italy and Great Britain earned a spot as the host nation of one of the tournaments.

==== Tournament in Italy ====
- Italy
- Serbia
- Switzerland
- Israel

Date	Kickoff	Away	Score	Home	Game site
Semifinals
2 September	2:00 p.m. CEST	Israel	10–40	Italy	Stadio G. Teghil, Lignano Sabbiadoro
2 September	7:00 p.m. CEST	Switzerland	0–17	Serbia	Stadio G. Teghil, Lignano Sabbiadoro
Classification game
4 September	3:00 p.m. CEST	Israel	0–51	Switzerland	Stadio G. Teghil, Lignano Sabbiadoro
Final
4 September	7:00 p.m. CEST	Serbia	14–17	Italy	Stadio G. Teghil, Lignano Sabbiadoro

==== Tournament in Great Britain ====
- Great Britain
- Czech Republic
- Netherlands
- Russia

Date	Kickoff	Away	Score	Home	Game site
Semifinals
16 September		Russia	3–30	Great Britain	Sixways Stadium, Worcester
16 September		Netherlands	13–20	Czech Republic	Sixways Stadium, Worcester
Classification game
18 September		Russia	6–17	Netherlands	Sixways Stadium, Worcester
Final
18 September		Czech Republic	13–38	Great Britain	Sixways Stadium, Worcester

=== Third round ===
Italy and Great Britain, as the winners of the tournaments in Italy and Great Britain, were respectively assigned to play against Sweden and Denmark (fifth and sixth place at the 2014 EFAF Championship), with the winners advancing to the 2018 tournament.

In June 2017, Italy qualified for the final tournament as only one of the four teams without any match played. Finland, who was already qualified, did not appear on the schedule and no reasons were given.

By March 2018, Sweden, Denmark, and Great Britain had advanced to the final tournament. Germany and Italy were not on the list. According to American Football International the reason for Germany not joining was due to the teams in the German Football League voting not to change the league schedule to accommodate the European Championships.

== Teams ==
- Finland (2014 fourth-placed, host)
- Austria (2014 runner-up)
- France (2014 third-placed)
- Sweden (qualifier)
- Denmark (qualifier)
- Great Britain (qualifier)

== Venue ==
All games were played at Myyrmäen jalkapallostadion in Vantaa, Finland.

Vantaa
Myyrmäen jalkapallostadion
Capacity: 4,700
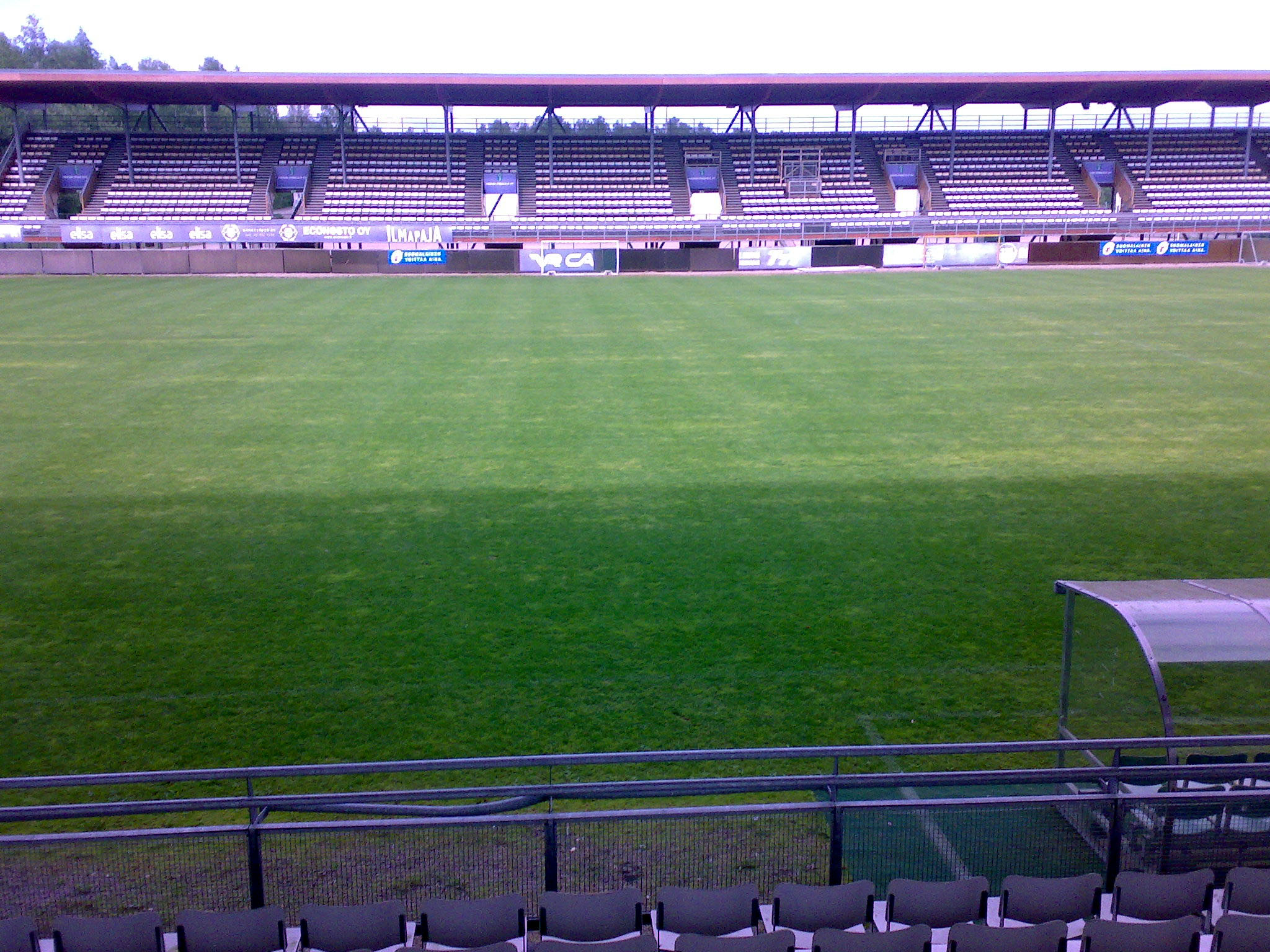

== Group stages ==
=== Group A ===
==== Standings ====
Team	W	L	Pct	PF	PA	PD
Austria	2	0	1.000	81	18	+63
Sweden	1	1	0.500	33	61	−28
Denmark	0	2	0.000	35	70	−35

==== Schedule ====
Quarter	1	2	3	4	Total
Austria	0	14	6	20	40
Denmark	0	7	8	0	15

at Myyrmäen jalkapallostadion, Vantaa

- Date: 29 July 2018
- Game time: 16:00 EEST
- Game attendance: 502
- Referee: Øyvind Løken
- Box score

Quarter	1	2	3	4	Total
Denmark	14	0	0	6	20
Sweden	0	7	17	6	30

at Myyrmäen jalkapallostadion, Vantaa

- Date: 31 July 2018
- Game time: 16:00 EEST
- Game attendance: 347
- Referee: Bård Beylich
- Box score

Quarter	1	2	3	4	Total
Sweden	3	0	0	0	3
Austria	21	10	7	3	41

at Myyrmäen jalkapallostadion, Vantaa

- Date: 2 August 2018
- Game time: 16:00 EEST
- Game attendance: 512
- Referee: Øyvind Løken
- Box score

=== Group B ===
==== Standings ====
Team	W	L	Pct	PF	PA	PD
France	2	0	1.000	63	23	+40
Finland	1	1	0.500	42	28	+14
Great Britain	0	2	0.000	16	70	−54

==== Schedule ====
Quarter	1	2	3	4	Total
Great Britain	0	7	0	0	7
Finland	7	21	0	0	28

at Myyrmäen jalkapallostadion, Vantaa

- Date: 29 July 2018
- Game time: 20:00 EEST
- Game attendance: 1650
- Referee: Bård Beylich
- Box score

Quarter	1	2	3	4	Total
France	14	14	7	7	42
Great Britain	3	3	3	0	9

at Myyrmäen jalkapallostadion, Vantaa

- Date: 31 July 2018
- Game time: 20:00 EEST
- Game attendance: 428
- Referee: Øyvind Løken
- Box score

Quarter	1	2	3	4	Total
Finland	0	0	7	7	14
France	0	7	0	14	21

at Myyrmäen jalkapallostadion, Vantaa

- Date: 2 August 2018
- Game time: 20:00 EEST
- Game attendance: 2518
- Referee: Bård Beylich
- Box score

=== Finals ===
5th place game

Quarter	1	2	3	4	Total
Great Britain	7	7	12	7	33
Denmark	0	0	8	8	16

at Myyrmäen jalkapallostadion, Vantaa

- Date: 4 August 2018
- Game time: 11:00 EEST
- Game weather: Sunny, +25°C
- Game attendance: 303
- Referee: (Finland) Veikko Lamminsalo
- TV: YLE Areena
- Box score

Game information

First quarter

- GB – Dan Conroy 4-yard run (Ian Jacquet kick), 0:33. Great Britain 7–0.

Second quarter

- GB – Dan Conroy 67-yard pass from Patrick Daley (Ian Jacquet kick), 5:16. Great Britain 14–0

Third quarter

- GB – Alex Haldane 20-yard fumble return (Kick failed), 8:34. Great Britain 20-0
- DEN – Lasse Lykke 2-yard pass from Kasper Bolmgren (Thomas Thellufsen pass from Lasse Hansen), 2:31. Great Britain 20-8
- GB – Josh Amis 100-yard kick-off return (Kick failed), 2:16 Great Britain 26-8

Fourth quarter

- DEN – Aske Klixbüll 8-yard pass from Kasper Bolmgren (Thomas Ashworth pass from Lasse Hansen), 8:13. Great Britain 26-16
- GB – Ian Jacquet 20-yard pass from Patrick Daley (Ian Jacquet kick), 3:10. Great Britain 33-16

Top passers

- GB – Patrick Daley – 15/24, 257 yards, 2 TD, INT
- DEN – Kasper Bolmgren – 18/37, 210 yards, 2 TD, 4 INT

Top rushers

- GB – Omodeji Alli – 7 rushes, 43 yards
- DEN – Michel Konate – 13 rushes, 30 yards

Top receivers

- GB – Dan Conroy – 2 receptions, 85 yards, 1 TD
- DEN – Mads Christiansen – 3 receptions, 41 yards

Bronze medal game

Quarter	1	2	3	4	Total
Sweden	0	6	15	0	21
Finland	7	7	7	14	35

at Myyrmäen jalkapallostadion, Vantaa

- Date: 4 August 2018
- Game time: 15:00 EEST
- Game weather: Cloudy, +24°C
- Game attendance: 1,984
- Referee: (Norway) Bård Beylich
- TV: YLE Areena
- Box score

Game information

First quarter

- FIN – Karri Pajarinen 14-yard run (Joni-Petteri Malka kick), 9:33. Finland 7-0.

Second quarter

- FIN – Marcus Siiskonen 34-yard pass from Miro Kadmiry (Joni-Petteri Malka kick), 9:01. Finland 14-0.
- SWE – Philip Juhlin 8-yard run (Kick failed), 0:58. Finland 14-6.

Third quarter

- FIN – Veikka Lehtonen 4-yard run (Joni-Petteri Malka kick), 9:32. Finland 21-6.
- SWE – Jacob Dahre 7-yard pass from Philip Juhlin (Jacob Dahre pass from Philip Juhlin), 6:36. Finland 21-14
- SWE – Emil Knutsson 18-yard pass from Philip Juhlin (Jacob Dahre kick), 0:44. Tied 21-21.

Fourth quarter

- FIN – Karri Pajarinen 4-yard run (Joni-Petteri Malka kick), 8:08. Finland 28-21.
- FIN – Veikka Lehtonen 6-yard run (Joni-Petteri Malka kick), 1:56. Finland 35-21.

Top passers

- SWE – Philip Juhlin – 21/41, 310 yards, 2 TD, 2 INT
- FIN – Miro Kadmiry – 13/18, 159 yards, TD

Top rushers

- SWE – Philip Juhlin – 13 rushes, 80 yards, TD
- FIN – Karri Pajarinen – 12 rushes, 82 yards, 2 TD

Top receivers

- SWE – Jacob Dahre – 10 receptions, 122 yards, TD
- FIN – Marcus Siiskonen – 2 receptions, 41 yards, TD

Final

Quarter	1	2	3	4	Total
France	7	0	14	7	28
Austria	0	14	0	0	14

at Myyrmäen jalkapallostadion, Vantaa

- Date: 4 August 2018
- Game time: 18:00 EEST
- Game weather: Cloudy, +24°C
- Game attendance: 1,757
- Referee: (Norway) Øyvind Løken
- TV: YLE Areena
- Box score

Game information

First quarter

- FRA – Andrew James 34-yard pass from Paul Durand (Jefferson Alexandre kick), 2:42. France 7-0. Drive: 7 plays, 70 yards, 3:18

Second quarter

- AUT – Sandro Platzgummer 41-yard run (Thomas Pichlmann kick), 10:15. Tied 7-7. Drive: 7 plays, 79 yards, 4:23
- AUT – Berhard Seikovits 12-yard pass from Alexander Thury (Thomas Pichlmann kick), 2:51. Austria 14-7. Drive: 4 plays, 36 yards, 1:30

Third quarter

- FRA – Jason Aguemon 49-yard run (Jefferson Alexandre kick), 9:01. Tied 14-14. Drive: 6 plays, 81 yards, 2:53
- FRA – Jerome Valbon 1-yard pass from Paul Durand (Jefferson Alexandre kick), 3:38. France 21-14. Drive: 8 plays, 63 yards, 3:50

Fourth quarter

- FRA – Jefferson Alexandre 20-yard pass from Paul Durand (Jefferson Alexandre kick), 5:25. France 28-14. Drive: 10 plays, 75 yards, 4:49

Top passers

- FRA – Paul Durand – 18/27, 225 yards, 3 TD, INT
- AUT – Alexander Thury – 10/28, 85 yards, TD, INT

Top rushers

- FRA – Jason Aguemon – 11 rushes, 63 yards, TD
- AUT – Sandro Platzgummer – 7 rushes, 58 yards, TD

Top receivers

- FRA – Jefferson Alexandre – 4 receptions, 54 yards, TD
- AUT – Berhard Seikovits – 5 receptions, 46 yards, TD

== See also ==
- International Federation of American Football
