= Hungary national American football team =

Hungary
- Nicknames: Team Hungary
- Sport: Gridiron football
- Founded: 2013
- League: MAFSZ
- Division: IFAF Europe
- Stadium: Hidegkuti Nándor Stadion, Budapest
- Head coach: (Hungary) Ferenc Sződy
- Website: mafsz.org

The Hungarian National American Football Team is the official American football senior national team of Hungary. They are organized by the Hungarian American Football Association (Magyar Amerikai Futball Szövetség, MAFSZ). They get their players mostly from teams of the Hungarian American Football League.

== History ==
The Hungarian national team was founded in 2013. The head coach was Lee Hlavka, the offensive coordinator is István Kovács, and the defensive coordinator was Karim Trabelsi. They played their first game with Czech Republic in Budapest, where they lost 7–26. In 2015, they participated in the first round of the qualifying round for 2018 European Championship against Serbia in Voždovac Stadium, Belgrade (0–56).

In 2016 Vilmos Grátz became the HC, the OC remained Kovács, and the DC became László Pacuk. They played two friendly games against Poland and Belgium.

In 2016, the under 19 team was founded, and they played their first friendly match against Slovakia.

== Matches ==
Date	Venue	Opponent	Result	Occasion
27 September 2015	Budapest, Építők Stadium (h)	Czech Republic	L 7–26 (0–2, 0–17, 7–7, 0–0)	friendly
11 October 2015	Beograd, Voždovac Stadium (a)	Serbia	L 0–56 (0–14, 0–21, 0–14, 0–7)	EC Qualification
24 September 2016	Székesfehérvár, First Field (h)	Poland	W 23–22 (3–3, 0–13, 0–0, 20–6)	friendly
29 October 2016	Székesfehérvár, First Field (h)	Belgium	L 17–20 (3–0, 0–6, 0–7, 14–7)	friendly
16 September 2017	Budapest, Hidegkuti Stadium (h)	Slovakia	W 42–3 (0–0, 21–0, 7–0, 14–3)	friendly
23 September 2018	Bratislava, Dúbravka Stadium (a)	Slovakia	W 61–0 (30–0, 10–0, 7–0, 14–0)	Three Nations Cup
14 October 2018	Budapest, Hidegkuti Stadium (h)	Czech Republic	W 23–15 (7–7, 10–8, 6–0, 0–0)	Three Nations Cup
12 October 2019	Budapest, Hidegkuti Stadium (h)	Spain	W 24–7 (14–0, 0–0, 10–0, 0–7)	EC Group B
26 October 2019	Beringen, Mijnstadium (a)	Belgium	W 31–7 (3–0, 0–0, 21–7, 7–0)	EC Group B
12 September 2021	Székesfehérvár, First Field (h)	Israel	W 44–19 (10–0, 24–7, 3–0, 7–12)	EC Group B
6 November 2021	Istanbul, Olympic Stadium (a)	Turkey	W 24–20 (0–7, 17–0, 0–10, 7–3)	EC Group B
23 October 2022	Vienna, Donaufeld Stadium (a)	Austria	L 0–41 (0–7, 0–3, 0–17, 0–14)	EC Group A Div D
5 November 2022	Budapest, Rugby Center (h)	France	L 2–9 (0–0, 2–6, 0–0, 0–3)	EC Group A Div D
29 October 2023	Budapest, Rugby Center (h)	Czech Republic	W 30–0 (0–0, 13–0, 10–0, 7–0)	EC Group A 9-10th place
12 October 2024	Budapest, Rugby Center (h)	Austria	L 3–58 (0–21, 3–10, 0–14, 0–13)	EC Group A Div A
19 October 2024	Melenci, Rusanda Stadium (a)	Serbia	W 25–19 (7–14, 0–0, 6–3, 6–2, 6–0)	EC Group A Div A
2 August 2025	Gentofte, Gentofte Sportspark (a)	Denmark	L 28–30 (7–0, 0–10, 7–7, 14–13)	EC Group A 5-8th place
25 October 2025	Budapest, Rugby Center (h)	Sweden		EC Group A 7-8th place

== Roster ==
Squad for 2015 European Championship qualification:

Hungary national American Football team roster
Quarterbacks: Bencsics Márk; Czirók Márton; Jordan Vasyl; Váry Tamás; Running backs: Cseperkáló Péter; Danku Dávid; Kövecses Attila; Lenner Péter; Ratkovics András; Roják Richárd; Wide receivers: Becs László; Elek Ádám; Gecser Máté; Kántor Bálint; Kocsis Péter; Lakatos Bence; Madarassy Kristóf; Rácz Balázs; Storcz András; Tokaji Péter	Offensive linemen: Cseri Zoltán; Hartai Gábor; Horváth Péter; Kovács Ádám; Kovács Gábor; Menczel Dániel; Migály Gergő; Pethő Ferenc; Siklós Tamás; Sőrés László; Vághy Ádám; Defensive linemen: Arató Miklós; Berzai Lajos; Biró Szabolcs; Borek Dávid; Csányi Balázs; Kovács Bence; Kovács Sándor; Krizsai Botond; Nedzelsky Max; Novák Gergely; Stadler Dániel; Szűcs Tibor	Linebackers: Ágota Balázs; Bánfi Mihály; Becs Péter; Harsányi Tamás; Mózes Dániel; Oláh Richárd; Paulenka László; Péter Csaba; Sap Remy; Törzsök Tamás; Varga Ferenc; Végh Imre; Defensive backs: Deák Balázs; Demeter Ádám; Kárpáti Balázs; Mezei Márk; Nemes Nátán; Németh Márton; Sipos Norbert; Szakács Kristóf; Szobonya Bence; Venczel Tibor	Inactive list Roster updated 2016-09-06

== See also ==
- Hungarian American Football League
