= American football at the 2017 World Games =

- Venue: Olympic Stadium
- Dates: 22–24 July 2017
- No. of events: 1
- Competitors: 172 from 4 nations

The American football tournament at the 2017 World Games in Wrocław was an invitation sport. It was played between 22 and 24 July. There were 172 competitors, from 4 nations, that participated in the tournament. The competition took place at Olympic Stadium.

== Team USA situation ==
Following the 2015 split between IFAF Paris and IFAF New York, IFAF Paris expelled USA Football in 2017. USA Football was replaced by the United States Federation of American Football (USFAF) in Paris, while New York retained USA Football as their active member. Since IFAF Paris was recognized by the IWGA and International Olympic Committee at the time, the USFAF was permitted to organize the United States national American football team for the 2017 World Games.

Players, mainly professional Americans playing in Europe, were chosen for the team on May 31, 2017. Players were promised full funding from the USFAF; however, the funding was withdrawn just days before the competition and players had to provide their own transportation to Wrocław. As a result, most of the team withdrew from the competition and were instead replaced by volunteers who were already in Europe at the time. Most of the team arrived the day before their opening match vs the Germany national American football team. The American team suffered from a lack of sync between quarterback and receivers, difficulties in pass protection that resulted in four interceptions, and a high number of procedure penalties and substitution infractions. The USA lost to Germany 13–14, which was the first loss ever for a United States national American football team in international competition.

== Qualification ==
=== Men's tournament ===
Means of qualification	Date	Qualified
Host country	23 April 2016	Poland
IFAF Americas Qualifiers	23 April 2016	United States
IFAF Asia Qualifiers	23 April 2016	Japan (withdrew)
IFAF Europe Qualifiers	23 April 2016	Germany
Reallocation		France

== Competition schedule ==
Legend
M	Match

Thu 20	Fri 21	Sat 22	Sun 23
M1			M2

== Medal table ==
Rank	Nation	Gold	Silver	Bronze	Total
1	France	1	0	0	1
2	Germany	0	1	0	1
3	United States	0	0	1	1
Totals (3 entries)		1	1	1	3

== Event ==
Event	Gold	Silver	Bronze
Men's tournament	France	Germany	United States

== Men's competition ==
=== Knockout stage ===
Games consisted of four 7-minute quarters in regulation time.

Semifinals
22 July
United States	13
Germany	14
22 July
Poland	2
France	28

Gold medal match
24 July
Germany	6
France	14
Bronze medal match
24 July
United States	14
Poland	7
