= European Championship of American football =

American football competition

European Championship
- Sport: American football
- Founded: 1983
- Most recent champion: Austria (2nd title)
- Most titles: Finland (5 titles)
- Website: www.ifafeurope.org

The European Championship is a continental competition of American football founded in 1983 and contested by the member countries of IFAF Europe. The tournament also serves as a qualifier for the IFAF World Championship. This championship is also known as "the Golden Fair League" until 2014 when the European Federation of American Football coordinated the competition. The first championship tournament was held in 1983.

In response to the 2022 Russian invasion of Ukraine, the Russian national American football team was suspended from the competition after Italy refused to play against Russia that October in a qualifier for the 2023 IFAF European Championships.

== Results ==
Year	Host	Final			Third place match		
Year	Host	Winner	Score	Runner-up	3rd place	Score	4th place
1983; Details	Italy	Italy	18–6	Finland	West Germany	27–20	France
1985; Details	Italy	Finland	13–2	Italy	West Germany	13–0	France
1987; Details	Finland	Italy	24–22	West Germany	Finland	38–23	Great Britain
1989; Details	West Germany	Great Britain	26–0	Finland	West Germany	29–9	Italy
1991; Details	Finland	Great Britain	14–3	Finland	Netherlands	17–12	France
1993; Details	Italy	Finland	17–7	Italy	Germany	21–3	Sweden
1995; Details	Austria	Finland	27–7	Italy	Austria	18–0	Ukraine
1997; Details	Italy	Finland	27–6	Sweden	Italy	14–7	Great Britain
2000; Details	Finland	Finland	30–29	Germany	Ukraine Great Britain	(Note: No 3rd place match played. Both teams shared the third position.)	
2001; Details	Germany	Germany	19–7	Finland	Sweden	(Note: Great Britain withdrew)	Great Britain
2005; Details	Sweden	Sweden	16–7	Germany	Finland	34–12	Great Britain
2010; Details	Germany	Germany	26–10	France	Austria	30–0	Sweden
2014; Details	Austria	Germany	30–27	Austria	France	35–21	Finland
2018; Details	Finland	France	28–14	Austria	Finland	35–21	Sweden
2021; Details	Europe	Italy	41–14	Sweden	Finland	14–6	France
2023; Details	Europe	Austria	28–0	Finland	Italy	26–7	Sweden
2025; Details	Europe	Austria	27–0	Finland	Italy	17–14	Germany

== Teams ==
- Winner
- Runner-up
- Third place
- Fourth place
- SF – Semi-finalist
- QF – Quarter finalist
- Q – Participant of the qualification round
- Q3 – Participant of the third qualification round
- Q2 – Participant of the third qualification round
- Q1 – Participant of the third qualification round

Name	1983	1985	1987	1989	1991	1993	1995	1997	2000	2001	2005	2010	2014	2018	2021	2023
Finland	Runner-up	Winner	3 place	Runner-up	Runner-up	Winner	Winner	Winner	Winner	Runner-up	3 place	5 place	4 place	3 place	3 place	Runner-up
Germany	3 place	3 place	Runner-up	3 place		3 place	QF		Runner-up	Winner	Runner-up	Winner	Winner			
Italy	Winner	Runner-up	Winner	4 place	Q3	Runner-up	Runner-up	3 place							Winner	3 place
United Kingdom			4 place	Winner	Winner			4 place	Semi-finalist	Semi-finalist	4 place	6 place		5 place	8 place	
Sweden				Q1	Q3	4 place	Q	Runner-up		Semi-finalist	Winner	4 place	5 place	4 place	Runner-up	4 place
France	4 place	4 place	QF	QF	4 place					Q	QF	Runner-up	3 place	Winner	4 place	
Austria	5 place		Q1		Q2		3 place		Q	QF		3 place	Runner-up	Runner-up	5 place	Winner
Ukraine							4 place	Q	Semi-finalist	QF						
Netherlands			Q1	Q1	3 place	Q								Q		
Norway				Q2			Q									
Belgium					Q1		Q									
Spain					Q1		Q	Q		QF						
Russia					Q2				Q							
Denmark										Q			6 place	6 place	6 place	
Switzerland			Q2											Q		
Serbia															7 place	

== Performance by team ==
Pos.	Team	Champion	Runner-up	Third	Fourth
1	Finland	5	6	4	1
2	Germany	3	3	4	1
3	Italy	3	3	3	1
4	Austria	2	2	2	–
5	Great Britain	2	–	1*	4
6	Sweden	1	2	1	4
7	France	1	1	1	4
8	Ukraine	–	–	1*	1
9	Netherlands	–	–	1	–

- *semi-finalist in 2000 (no 3rd place match played)

== See also ==
- Women's European Championship of American football
- IFAF European Flag Football Championship
- NFL Europe
