= Great Britain national American football team =

Team representing the UK in international gridiron

(United Kingdom) Great Britain
- Name: GB Lions National Team
- Federation: IFAF Europe
- Region: Europe
- Founded: 1985
- Color: White, blue, red, gold
- Head Coach: Jason Scott

First international
- Great Britain 7–0 France (Walton-on-Thames, United Kingdom; 29 September 1985)

Biggest win
- Great Britain 58–2 France (Dunkirk, France; 22 March 1987)

Biggest defeat
- Great Britain 0–50 France (Wetzlar, Germany; 27 July 2010)

The Great Britain national American football team, known as the GB Lions, represents the UK in international gridiron. It is controlled by the British American Football Association.

== Men's senior team ==
=== History ===
The Men's Senior GB Lions played their first game against France in 1985 at Stompond Lane. 2,000 attendees watched GB claim a 7–0 win thanks to a Victor Ebubedike touchdown. In 1986 and 1987, the Lions defeated the Netherlands and France over two legs each to qualify for the 1987 European Championship.

At their first major tournament, the Lions were defeated by Italy and Finland on their way to a 4th-place finish.

In 1989, they defeated France on the way to qualifying to their second consecutive championship. They defeated hosts Germany comprehensively in the semi-final thanks to Victor Ebubedike, Trevor Carthy and Allan Brown, who scored two touchdowns each in a 38–6 victory. The Terry Smith-led Lions met Finland in the final and got revenge for the 1987 defeat by shutting their rivals out in a 26–0 victory to claim their first European championship.

In 1991, the Lions, led by London Monarchs assistant Ray Willsey returned to defend their championship in Helsinki. After defeating the Netherlands 46–3 in the semi-final, they again met Finland in the Olympic Stadium and won 14–3 to claim back to back championships. 9 Lions were Tournament MVP Jason Elliott, Barry Driver, Mark Webb, Jo Richardson, Colin Nash, Paul Roberts, Warren Billingham, Gary Mills and Bola Ayiede.

In 1993, BAFA withdrew from the EFL and as such the Lions could not defend their title at the 1993 European Championships in Italy. In preparation for the 1995 European Championships in Austria, they defeated Ireland, but after Germany sensationally withdrew from the tournament, the Lions were hastily scheduled to play Ukraine away and potentially two further games in Austria within the space of eight days. Unable to handle the logistics, the Lions pulled out of the 1995 championships.

In 1997, the Lions returned to European competition, defeating Spain in Metropolitano Stadium to qualify for the European Championships. In the semi-final, they lost 24-6 to Finland, and were defeated 14-7 by Italy in the third/fourth place playoff.

After the 1999 European Championships were suspended, the Lions were invited to take part in the inaugural IFAF World Championship but declined the offer. Ahead of the 2000 European Championship, head coach Riq Ayub resigned, and the Lions were again defeated by Finland.

In 2001, the Lions defeated Spain to qualify for the European Championships, where they expected to receive a semi-final bye after the disqualification of Germany. Following a successful appeal, however, Germany were reinstated into the tournament and would face the Lions in the semi-final. Unable to fulfil the fixture at such short notice, the Lions were expelled from the tournament.

Following a reformatting of the European Championships, the 2005 Championship saw nations divided into three pools. In 2004, the Lions were placed in Pool B, and defeated Russia, Spain and France to win their pool, and qualify for Pool A of the championship. The Lions were defeated by the visiting Centre Colonels from Kentucky at Crystal Palace National Sports Centre, and were shut out by the one-seeded German team in the semi-final. In the bronze medal match, they were defeated by Finland 34–12.

In 2009, the Lions were defeated in a friendly by Australia but defeated reigning European champions Sweden in their next game. In the 2010 European Championships, the Lions were defeated by France, Sweden and Finland, scoring only 11 points on their way to a 6th-place finish. The Lions finished 3rd in the Group B Qualification tournament in Milan in 2013 and therefore did qualify to compete in the 2014 Championships.

=== European Championship record ===
Year	Position	GP	W	L	PF	PA
(Italy) 1985	Did not participate					
(Finland) 1987	4th	2	0	2	33	54
(Germany) 1989	1st	2	2	0	64	6
(Finland) 1991	1st	2	2	0	63	7
(Italy) 1993	Did not participate					
(Austria) 1995	Did not participate					
(Italy) 1997	4th	2	0	2	13	48
(Germany) 2000	n/a	1	0	1	9	34
(Germany) 2001	Expelled from tournament					
(Sweden) 2005	4th	2	0	2	12	68
(Germany) 2010	6th	3	0	3	11	96
(Austria) 2014	Did not participate					
(Finland) 2018	5th	3	1	2	49	86
(Europe) 2021	8th	4	1	3	48	106
(Europe) 2023	5th	3	2	1	60	56
(Europe) 2025	9th	2	0	2	30	69

=== Personnel ===
==== Staff ====
Head coach

- Head coach: Jason Scott
- Associate head coach: Matthew Davies
- General manager: Grant Lawless

Offensive coaches

- Offensive coordinator: Adam Lillis
- Senior offensive analyst: Luke Carlton
- Offensive line: Alex Davies & Kevin Keohane
- Wide receivers: Dave Gibbs
- Quarterbacks: Alec Glen
- Running backs: Deji Alli
- Graduate assistant: Eliot Hutton
- Graduate assistant: Clark Gardener
- Graduate assistant: Mark Musick
- Quality control: Laura Dye

Defensive coaches

- Defensive coordinator: Duncan Burford
- Inside linebackers: Eddie Cheadle
- Outside linebackers: Ben Davies
- Defensive backs: George Foster
- Defensive line: Stephen Gregory & Raphael Omozusi
- Graduate assistant: Cian Ryan-Morgan
- Graduate assistant: Dean Carless
- Graduate assistant: Jacob Maxted
- Quality control: Jack Farr

Special teams coaches

- Special teams: Al Jarvis
- Graduate assistant: Stuart Gilmour
- Film technician: Sean Endicott
- Operations: Lloyd Stone

Others

- Medical staff: Beverly Analuwa
- Medical staff: Jakki Duncan

==== Roster ====
GB Lions Men's Senior roster - 2016 European Championship Qualifiers
Quarterbacks: Jerome Allen - London Warriors; Running backs & full backs: Omodeji Alli - London Blitz; Adam Hope - Tamworth Phoenix; Temi Oduyemi - London Blitz; Dwayne Watson - London Warriors; Wide receivers & tight ends: Ben Burslem - Tamworth Phoenix; Jack Daley - London Blitz; Charlie Joseph - London Blitz; Alex Laird - London Blitz; Sam Rogers - London Blitz; Harry Routledge - Merseyside Nighthawks; David Saul - Potsdam Royals; Tim Thomas - Seinäjoki Crocodiles	Offensive linemen: Ben Ashby - London Warriors; Victor Bama - London Warriors; James Connolly - London Blitz; Kevin Keohane - London Warriors; Thomas Levick - Tamworth Phoenix; Matt Meyer - London Blitz; Ayodeji Ogunkolati - London Blitz; Azmi Sbati - London Blitz; Defensive linemen: Jamie Charles - London Blitz; Ade Kamson - London Warriors; Nial Scott - London Warriors; Josh Vines - London Blitz; Steve Wilson - East Kilbride Pirates; Rodon Zeqiri - London Blitz	Linebackers: James Armah - Bristol Aztecs; Matt Eva - London Blitz; Fab Gargiulo - London Blitz; Alex Haldane - London Warriors; Jake Harbon - Tamworth Phoenix; Alasdir Jarvis - Tamworth Phoenix; Ariel Mofondo - London Warriors; Jonell Pelle - London Blitz; Defensive backs: Josh Amis - London Warriors; Emir Battaloğlu - Tamworth Phoenix; Enoch Hankombo - London Blitz; Ashley Hopkinson - Stirling Clansmen; David Jennison - Potsdam Royals; John Kenyon - Potsdam Royals; Daniel McKenzie - London Warriors; Sam Obi - London Warriors; Leslie Oluwole-Wilson - London Warriors; Final Roster for the 2016 European Championship Qualifiers.

==== Roster ====
GB Lions Men's Senior roster - 2022 European Championship Qualifier vs Italy
Quarterbacks: Josh Allsebrook - Tamworth Phoenix; Sam Bloomfield - Manchester Titans; Sam Huxtable - Bristol Aztecs; Running backs & full backs: D'Wayne Obi - London Warriors; Andy Owusu - London Warriors; Thomas Campbell - Allgäu Comets; Thomas Jones - Manchester Titans; Wide receivers & tight ends: Max Gracie-Ainscough - Tamworth Phoenix; Joe Hamilton - London Blitz; Anousheh Fulford - Tamworth Phoenix; Bolaji Adewale - University of Nottingham; Adam Bamber - Manchester Titans; Chris Winrow - Manchester Titans; Finley Old (TE) - University of Nottingham; Sean Cook (TE) - Bristol Aztecs; Henry Rowland (TE) - Tamworth Phoenix	Offensive linemen: Lewis Thomas - Hamburg Seadevils; Martin O'Connor - London Warriors; Alex Phillips - Solent Thrashers; Adam McClure - Solent Thrashers; Andy Watts - Northumberland Vikings; Ibrahim Ahmed - London Blitz; David Pembertom - Tamworth Phoenix; Defensive linemen: Emmanuel Feybunmi - University of Portsmouth; Rodon Zeqiri - London Warriors; Ceddaric Akrong - London Warriors; Deejay Ogunkolati - London Blitz; Wayne Drew - Tamworth Phoenix; Arthur Mbahin - Tamworth Phoenix; Cade Makin - Manchester Titans	Linebackers: Charles Nelson-Nwufoh - Tamworth Phoenix; Luke Neill - Tamworth Phoenix; Jai Jackson - London Blitz; Ant Naughton - Tamworth Phoenix; Jamaal Fredericks - London Warriors; Defensive backs: NK Smith - London Warriors; Leo Corney - London Blitz; Tonye Dokubo - London Blitz; Ryan Claudio - London Blitz; Danylo Szlachetko Blackburn - University of Nottingham; Will Hobbs - Tamworth Phoenix; Courtney Etienne - Tamworth Phoenix; Sam Fossey - Manchester Titans; Jordan Metcalf - London Warriors; Kicker/Punter: Alex Lenkowski - Tamworth Phoenix; Final Roster for the 2022 European Championship Qualifier vs Italy.

== GB Students ==
=== History ===
GB Students were founded in 1993 as a BCAFL "Allstars" team, coached by Damian Bayford from the University of Leeds. They were renamed the Bulldogs in the mid-1990s and mostly played touring teams.

After falling under the remit of BUCS in 2008, the governing body refused to sanction entry into the 2014 FISU World Championships.

Due to financial limitations and administrative errors, blamed on both BAFA and BUCS, no GB Students team appeared at the 2016 World Championships in Mexico, which resulted in the resignation of head coach, Wayne Hill.

=== Personnel ===
==== Staff ====
Managers

- Team manager: Greg Freeman

Offensive coaches

- Offensive coordinator: Tony Athersmith
- Quarterbacks: Ryan Baker
- Offensive line: Paul Sheratt
- Wide receivers: James Hossack
- Running backs: Jay Alexander

Defensive coaches

- Defensive coordinator: Pete Laird
- Defensive line: Paul Summers
- Linebackers: Simon Hatcher
- Defensive backs: Kit Lawson

Other

- Strength & conditioning: Fabrizio Gargiulo

==== Roster ====
GB Students roster
Quarterbacks: Callum Davidson - UCB; James Slack - Loughborough; Running backs & full backs: Xavier Ajuwon - Birmingham; Jacob Amadi - Swansea; Thomas Campbell - Stirling; Jordan Crouch - UWE; Wide receivers & tight ends: Ben Burslem - Loughborough; Charlie Hardman - Birmingham; Aden Flannagan - Sheffield Hallam; Will Hussey - Birmingham; James Draper - Loughborough; Sam Rogers - Loughborough	Offensive linemen: James Connolly - Loughborough; Steven Hartman - Gloucestershire; Josh Thompson - Loughborough; Alex Davies - Birmingham; Stuart Butcher - Bedfordshire; Jamie Gallagher - Durham; Ross Martin - Greenwich; Defensive linemen: Josh Gaff - Birmingham; Josh Vines - Birmingham; Agui Mansilla - Brunel; Ti Ojuyah - Brunel; Thomas Lachendro - Glasgow; Jon Ridge - Hertfordshire; Will Stone - Birmingham	Linebackers: Dominic Gould - Hertfordshire; Zak Senior - Birmingham; David Izinyon - Surrey; Harry Shelton - Hertfordshire; Nik Evans - Birmingham; Ben Abbott - Greenwich; Ben Davies - Loughborough; Maxwell Stevens-Petitjean - Birmingham; Defensive backs: Dave Jennison - Hertfordshire; Tobi Ugundipe - Loughborough; Sam Jeater - Birmingham; Will Hobbs - Sheffield Hallam; Chris Moreau - Birmingham; Ashley Hopkinson - Stirling; Ben Rawthore - Liverpool John Moores; Stefan Rivera-Gonzalez - London; Final Roster for the 2015 Friendly vs Finland

== Under-19 team ==
The Great Britain U-19 American Football team represent the nation in international competition of youth American Football.

=== Personnel ===
==== Staff ====
Head coach

- Head coach & special teams coordinator: Scott Rowe

Offensive coaches

- Offensive coordinator: Andy Scott
- Offensive quality control: John Moore
- Offensive line: Pete Jones & Frankie Pankhurst
- Wide receivers: Clive Anthony-Palumbo & Jared Gray
- Running backs: Jonathan Chilton

Defensive coaches

- CO-defensive coordinator & defensive line: Martin Hume
- CO-defensive coordinator: Jack Watson
- Linebackers: Mike Ripley
- Assistant linebackers: Max Muchenje
- Safeties: Rikki Lear
- Cornerbacks: Ryan Allen
- Defensive assistant: Keith Johnson
- Analysts / Film: Ben "Bread" Read & Sam Johnson

Other

- U19 general manager: Ravnit Chatha
- General assistant: Taran Chatha

==== Roster ====
GB U19 roster
Quarterbacks: Josh Allsebrook - Tamworth Phoenix; Bailey Man - Kent Exiles; Alfie Birks - Bournemouth University; Running backs: Joe Blythe - Leeds Beckett University; Chris Gbenla - London Blitz; Lewis Munt - Bath Killer Bees; Sam Geddes - Gateshead Senators; Wide receivers: Charles Chemali - Wembley Stallions; Noah Beddow - Tamworth Phoenix; Jude Scott - Leeds Beckett; Logan Irvine - SGS Pride; Harry Buckland - SGS Pride; Louis Anderson - Sheffield Giants; Sebastian Harris - London Warriors	Offensive linemen: Alfie Keery - SGS Pride; George Fear - Leeds Beckett; Chidubem Abazie - Leicester Longhorns; Aaron Villata - Kent Exiles; Sam Stokoe - London Blitz; Toby Spalinger - NFL Academy; Cameron Dwyer - SGS Pride; George Owen-Thomas - NFL Academy; Matthew Allen - South East Legion; Defensive linemen: Elvis Webster - Bristol Aztecs; Kieran Park - Gateshead Senators; Jake Pearman - Essex Spartans; Amrit Chatha - UWE Bullets; Max Kidd - Swindon Storm	Linebackers: Ryan Howard - University of Liverpool; Feranmi Okulola - SGS Pride; Fraser Holden - University of Nottingham; James Aubrey-Williams - Gateshead Senators; Jack Redhead - Tamworth Phoenix; Strong safeties: Miles Butt - SGS Pride; Matthew Knox - North East Giants; Joe Gallagher - SGS Pride; Jake Horne - South East Legion; Nelson Hamilton - Tamworth Phoenix; Corner backs: Joe Parton - Nottingham Trent University; Jerome Darko - Tamworth Phoenix; Merdan Dogan - London Blitz; Callum Twine - SGS Pride; Free safeties: Callum Grant - Solent Seahawks; Freddie Burton - Loughborough University; Vinnie Maxfield - NFL Academy

== Women's team ==
The Great Britain Women's Team were founded in 2012 and represent the nation in Women's American football. In the 2015 European Championships, the team finished as runners-up, losing to Finland 50–12, their first ever defeat, in the final.

=== Personnel ===
==== Staff ====
Head coach

- Head coach: Chris Stone

Team management

- Team manager: Becky Williams

Coaches

- Sammy-Lee Baker
- Claire Cochrane
- Aimee Cottingham
- Joshua Gaff
- Jamie Gallagher
- Matt Gawne
- Nick Glenday
- Wayne Hill
- Sam Marshall
- Sam Rafferty
- Tom Read
- Connah Scholes

Medical team

- Beverley Analuwa
- Ailish Clear
- Terri Denham

Final roster for the 2022 IFAF Women's World Championships

==== Roster ====
GB Women's roster
Quarterbacks: 11 | Sydney Green - Birmingham Lions; 12 | Angelina Fisher - London Warriors; Offensive line: 50 | Vanessa Mansaray - London Warriors; 52 | Lisa Dye - Merseyside Nighthawks; 60 | Iesha Martin - Birmingham Lions; 61 | Laura Dye - Merseyside Nighthawks; 68 | Alexandria Hodgson - Birmingham Lions; 70 | Yasmin Cazeau - London Warriors; 72 | Jakki Duncan - Teesside Steelers; 75 | Maz Hughes - Birmingham Lions; 77 | Jade Leighton - Teesside Steelers; 79 | Tara Minto - Wembley Stallions; Running backs: 14 | Aimee Robson - Teesside Steelers; 15 | Stephanie Wyant - Portsmouth Dreadnoughts; 21 | Ruth Matta - Birmingham Lions / Boston Renegades; 26 | Antoinette Morgan - Birmingham Lions; 30 | Gabrielle Derrick - Leeds Carnegie Chargers	Wide receivers: 2 | Emily Irvine - Birmingham Lions; 7 | Oli Davies - Birmingham Lions; 20 | Sophia Klair - Birmingham Lions; 27 | Siobhan Walker - London Warriors; 80 | Samantha Read - Wembley Stallions; 88 | Jessica Anderson - Hertfordshire Cheetahs; Tight ends: 17 | Shay Okelola - London Warriors; 44 | Charlie Thynne - Kent Exiles; Defensive line: 5 | Becky Martin - Kotka Eagles; 58 | Libby Davoren - Birmingham Lions; 62 | Rachel Kirton - Birmingham Lions; 64 | Carrie Stevenson - Crewe Railroaders; 67 | Delta Npuna - London Warriors; 85 | Zoe John - Cardiff Valkyries; 92 | Victoria Ware - Cambridgeshire Cats	Linebackers: 10 | Christina Ibironke - London Warriors; 23 | Tanya Dales - Peterborough Royals; 34 | Afia Law - Birmingham Lions / Birmingham Bulls; 40 | Summer Rivers - London Warriors; 42 | Bethany Pilkington - Leeds Carnegie Chargers; 48 | Robyn Steward - Manchester Titans; 55 | Rachael Moody - Edinburgh Wolves; Defensive backs: 1 | Josie Symonds - Birmingham Lions; 8 | Harley-May Lynch - Birmingham Lions; 9 | Rachel Trim - Birmingham Lions; 16 | Phoebe Schecter - Birmingham Lions; 22 | Emily Mullen - Edinburgh Wolves; 36 | Lucy Peaty - Surrey Stingers; Final roster for the 2022 IFAF Women's World Championships

== Flag Football ==
BAFA also runs three flag football teams for men, women and under-19s.
