= 2021 European Championship of American football =

Tournament details
- Host nation: Europe
- Dates: –
- No. of nations: 12

Final positions
- Champions: Italy
- Runner-up: Sweden
- Third-place: Finland

The 2021 European Championship was the 15th European Championship in American football. The preliminary round has been played around Europe from 21 September to 2 November 2019. The final round was scheduled to be played in 2020, but due to the COVID-19 pandemic it was postponed to 2021, and was played in August and October. In 2021 six out of the scheduled 12 games has not been played, including the semi-final between France and Italy.

== Group A, first round ==
The first round was played from 21 September to 2 November 2019. The 12 best teams from the previous championships have been selected to play in the top division, selected into three seeds. Top seed teams were the first 4 teams of the 2018 championship (France, Austria, Finland and Sweden), second tier contained the other 2 teams in the final round (Great Britain and Denmark) along with Italy and Serbia, while the third tier contained the Czech Republic, the Netherlands, Russia and Switzerland.

A	B	C	D
France (1)	Austria (2)	Finland (3)	Sweden (4)
Serbia (8)	Italy (7)	Denmark (6)	Great Britain (5)
Czech Republic (9)	Switzerland (10)	Netherlands (11)	Russia (12)

=== Division A ===
Team	W	L	Pct	PF	PA	PD
France	2	0	1.000	41	10	+31
Serbia	1	1	0.500	23	13	+10
Czech Republic	0	2	0.000	3	44	–41

Quarter	1	2	3	4	Total
France	0	7	0	21	28
Czech Republic	0	0	3	0	3

at Stadion v Jiráskově ulici, Jihlava, Czech Republic

- Date: 13 October 2019
- Game time: 4:00 PM
- Game attendance: 850
- Recap Article

Quarter	1	2	3	4	Total
Czech Republic	0	0	0	0	0
Serbia	7	3	0	6	16

at Gradski stadion, Požarevac, Serbia

- Date: 27 October 2019
- Game time: 11:30 AM
- Game attendance: 600
- Recap Article

Quarter	1	2	3	4	Total
Serbia	0	7	0	0	7
France	7	0	0	6	13

at Stade Pierre-Mauroy, Villeneuve-d'Ascq, France

- Date: 9 November 2019
- Game time: 4:00 PM
- Game attendance: 5000
- Article

=== Division B ===
Team	W	L	Pct	PF	PA	PD
Italy	2	0	1.000	59	14	+45
Austria	1	1	0.500	80	21	+59
Switzerland	0	2	0.000	0	104	–104

Quarter	1	2	3	4	Total
Austria	21	28	7	10	66
Switzerland	0	0	0	0	0

at Stadion Ringstrasse, Chur, Switzerland

- Date: 21 September 2019
- Recap

Quarter	1	2	3	4	Total
Italy	0	3	3	15	21
Austria	7	0	7	0	14

at Vienna, Austria

- Date: 6 October 2019
- Game attendance: 950
- Recap

Quarter	1	2	3	4	Total
Switzerland	0	0	0	0	0
Italy	14	10	7	7	38

at Milan, Italy

- Date: 20 October 2019
- Game time: 3:00 PM
- Referee: Marco Sala
- Recap

=== Division C ===
Team	W	L	Pct	PF	PA	PD
Finland	2	0	1.000	99	3	+96
Denmark	1	1	0.500	25	63	–38
Netherlands	0	2	0.000	19	77	–58

Quarter	1	2	3	4	Total
Finland	55	0	0	0	55
Netherlands	0	0	0	0	0

at Sportpark 't Cranevelt, Arnhem, Netherlands

- Date: 12 October 2019
- Game time: 7:00 PM

Quarter	1	2	3	4	Total
Netherlands	0	7	0	12	19
Denmark	8	8	6	0	22

at Gentofte Sportspark, Gentofte, Denmark

- Date: 19 October 2019
- Game time: 4:00 PM
- Recap

Quarter	1	2	3	4	Total
Denmark	3	0	0	0	3
Finland	0	20	21	3	44

at Myyrmäen jalkapallostadion, Vantaa, Finland

- Date: 26 October 2019
- Game time: 2:00 PM
- Recap

=== Division D ===
Team	W	L	Pct	PF	PA	PD
Sweden	2	0	1.000	70	21	+49
Great Britain	1	1	0.500	48	36	+12
Russia	0	2	0.000	7	68	–61

Quarter	1	2	3	4	Total
Sweden	7	13	7	7	34
Russia	0	0	7	0	7

at Moscow, Russia

- Date: 5 October 2019
- Game time: 6:00 PM
- Recap

Quarter	1	2	3	4	Total
Russia	0	0	0	0	0
Great Britain	13	7	0	14	34

at New River Stadium, London, Great Britain

- Date: 19 October 2019
- Game time: 4:00 PM
- Recap

Quarter	1	2	3	4	Total
Great Britain	0	0	0	14	14
Sweden	3	13	13	7	36

at Kristianstad fotbollsarena, Kristianstad, Sweden

- Date: 2 November 2019
- Game time: 2:00 PM
- Recap

== Group A, final stage ==
=== 1–4 ===
Semifinals
7	Italy	35
1	France	0 DNP
3	Finland	14
4	Sweden	22

Finals
7	Italy	41
4	Sweden	14
Third place
1	France	6
3	Finland	14

=== 5–8 ===
Placement 5–8
2	Austria	48
8	Serbia	6
5	Great Britain	0
6	Denmark	35 DNP

5th place game
2	Austria	38
6	Denmark	25
7th place game
8	Serbia	35
5	Great Britain	0 DNP

=== 9–12 ===
Placement 9–12
9	Czech Republic	0
12	Russia	35 DNP
10	Switzerland	35
11	Netherlands	0 DNP

9th place game
12	Russia	36
10	Switzerland	9
11th place game
9	Czech Republic	35
11	Netherlands	0 DNP

== Group B ==
Team	W	L	Pct	PF	PA	PD
Hungary	4	0	1.000	127	46	+81
Spain	2	1	0.667	72	49	+23
Israel	2	1	0.667	81	66	+15
Turkey	1	3	0.250	102	81	+21
Belgium	0	4	0.000	0	140	–140

Note: Belgium stepped down from the Championship in 2020, so their both played games (victory against Israel and loss against Hungary) have been administrated as 0:35 losses. The Israel-Spain game was cancelled.

== See also ==
- International Federation of American Football
