= Ricky Tjong-A-Tjoe =

Dutch gridiron football player (born 1990)

Ricky Tjong-a-Tjoe (born April 4, 1990) is a Dutch former gridiron football defensive end. He played college football at Boise State.

== Early life ==
Tjong-A-Tjoe grew up in the Venserpolder neighborhood of Amsterdam and played association football as a child before his brother introduced him to American football. He joined a local team, the Amsterdam Panthers. Tjong-a-Tjoe moved to the United States in 2008 with the goal of earning a college football scholarship. He played one season at Boise High School in Boise, Idaho, earning first-team all-state honors after recording 35 tackles, two sacks, and four forced fumbles. Tjong-a-Tjoe committed to Boise State in January 2009 over offers from schools like Oregon and Washington State. He signed his National Letter of Intent on February 4.

== College career ==
Tjong-a-Tjoe redshirted his first year at Boise State. In 2010, he recorded 24 tackles and 6.5 tackles for loss. In 2011, Tjong-a-Tjoe made 15 tackles and three tackles for loss in seven games. His season was shortened due to a six-game suspension for receiving improper benefits from a host family. Tjong-a-Tjoe had a breakout season as a redshirt junior and earned honorable mention all-Mountain West Conference (MWC) honors. He earned first-team all-MWC honors the following year.

== Professional career ==
After going undrafted in the 2014 NFL draft, Tjong-A-Tjoe signed a free agent contract with the San Diego Chargers.

In July 2022, he signed with the Rhein Fire of the European League of Football.

== National team career ==
Tjong-A-Tjoe played for the Netherlands national team during the 2018 European Championship qualifiers.
