= Poland national team =

Poland national team may refer to the following:

- Men:
  - Poland national American football team
  - Poland men's national basketball team
    - Poland men's national 3x3 team
  - Poland national football team
  - Poland national under-21 football team
  - Poland men's national handball team
  - Poland national rugby union team
  - Poland speedway team
  - Poland men's national volleyball team
  - Poland Davis Cup team
- Women:
  - Poland women's national football team
  - Poland women's national handball team
  - Poland women's national volleyball team
  - Poland Billie Jean King Cup team
