= Poland national American football team =

Poland
Logo

General information
- Colors: Red White

Current uniform

Home kit

The Poland national American Football team represents Poland in international American football competitions. The team was formed in 2012, consisting mainly of the Polish Football League players and coaching staff. In addition to players from the Polish league, players from the York Lions, Braunschweig Lions, Kouvola Indians and Kristiansand Gladiators have also participated in games.

The team was controlled by the Polish American Football Association. In 2020, the American Football Association in Poland became the national governing body, associated member of IFAF.

== History ==
The first international American football game played by Poland was played on February 2, 2013 in the Atlas Arena in Łódź, when the Poland national team met the Sweden national team in an Arena football game. Polish teams had previously played unofficial matches, beginning in 2005.

There are many Poles and players with Polish roots currently playing in NFL, for example Sebastian Janikowski, Tom Zbikowski, Chris, Dan, Rob Gronkowski, and in the past: Rich Szaro, Chester Marcol, Stas Maliszewski, Ron Jaworski, Zeke Bratkowski. There are also persons of Polish descent who play American football, such as Polish Americans. The latest addition is a son of Nigerian and a Polish woman, Babatunde Aiyegbusi who signed up with Minnesota Vikings after playing basketball as well as North American football for many Polish, Czech, and German clubs.

== Roster for the 2017 World Games ==
2017 Poland national American Football team roster
| Quarterbacks: 12 Karol Żak (Warsaw Eagles); 15 Bartosz Dziedzic (Panthers Wrocław); 19 Filip Mościcki (Kraków Kings); Running backs: 1 Adam Skakowski (Panthers Wrocław); 4 Mikołaj Pawlaczyk (Lowlanders Białystok); 40 Konrad Starczewski (Panthers Wrocław); Wide receivers: 2 Darrel Stewart Jr. (Panthers Wrocław); 3 Patryk Matkowski (Panthers Wrocław); 13 Tomasz Zubrycki (Lowlanders Białystok); 80 Adam Nelip (Panthers Wrocław); 81 Jakub Mazan (Seahawks Gdynia); 84 Grzegorz Dominik (Tychy Falcons); Defensive linemen: 43 Michał Niemas (Kiel Baltic Hurricanes); 50 Szymon Adamczyk (Panthers Wrocław); 57 Daniel Tarnawski (Warsaw Eagles); 67 Damian Wesołowski (Lowlanders Białystok); 71 Bartosz Bednarczyk (Paris Mousquetaires); 75 Arkadiusz Cieślok (Seahawks Gdynia); 78 Mateusz Szczęk (Lowlanders Białystok); 95 Wojciech Stolarczyk (Outlaws Wrocław); 97 Adrian Brudny (Braunschweig Lions); 99 Robert Rosołek (Panthers Wrocław) | Linebackers: 5 Hubert Ogrodowczyk (Panthers Wrocław); 6 Kamil Ruta (Panthers Wrocław); 54 Szymon Barczak (Kozły Poznań); 56 Maciej Jaroszewski (Husaria Szczecin); 91 Adam Roszkowski (Seahawks Gdynia); Defensive backs: 7 Tomasz Żukowski (Lowlanders Białystok); 10 Gabriel Kalus (Braunschweig Lions); 17 Paweł Świątek (Panthers Wrocław); 18 Marcin Kaim (Husaria Szczecin); 20 Karol Mogielnicki (Panthers Wrocław); 21 Mateusz Szefler (Panthers Wrocław); 25 Adam Lary (Panthers Wrocław); 26 Marcin Osumek (Tychy Falcons); 30 Antoni Omondi (Warsaw Eagles); 31 Kacper Kurcius (Tychy Falcons); Special teams: 10 Gabriel Kalus (Braunschweig Lions) PR; 81 Jakub Mazan (Seahawks Gdynia) KR, PR; Offensive linemen: 55 Rafał Rogaczewski (Panthers Wrocław); 61 Paweł Brodzki (Warsaw Eagles); 65 Kamil Piątek (Tychy Falcons); 69 Marek Stajer (Panthers Wrocław); 71 Bartosz Bednarczyk (Paris Mousquetaires); 73 Jakub Krystecki (Seahawks Gdynia); 74 Mateusz Sławiński (Warsaw Eagles); 79 Maciej Włodarczyk (Panthers Wrocław); 86 Łukasz Korpak (Kraków Kings) | Head coach: Bradley Arbon (United States); Assistant coaches: Sebastian Tuch (GER); Olaf Werner (GER); Filip Pawełka (POL); Joachim Ullrich (GER); Eugen Heidt (GER); Michał "Mike" Latek (POL); Sean Averhoff (GER); Tobias Ochs (GER); Roster accessed 2017-07-28 |

== European Championship ==
In 2015 Poland competed in the IFAF level qualifying playoff circuit for the first time.

| Year | Position | GP | W | L | PF | PA |
|---|---|---|---|---|---|---|
| (Germany) 2018 | Qualification first round lost to Czech Republic. | | | | | |

== IFAF World Championship record ==
| Year | Position | GP | W | L | PF | PA |
|---|---|---|---|---|---|---|
| (Italy) 1999 | Did not participate | | | | | |
| (Germany) 2003 | Did not participate | | | | | |
| (Japan) 2007 | Did not participate | | | | | |
| (Austria) 2011 | Did not participate | | | | | |
| (United States) 2015 | Did not participate | | | | | |
| 2025 | To be determined | | | | | |

== Head coaches ==
- (Poland) Maciej Cetnerowski (2012–2015)
- (United States) Bradley Arbon (2015–2017)

== All time results ==
| Date | Opponent | Venue | Result | Competition | Result |
|---|---|---|---|---|---|
| 13 November 2005 | (Czech Republic) Pardubice Stallions | Zgorzelec | 2–12 | Friendly (League All Star Team) | Loss |
| 2 February 2013 | Sweden | Atlas Arena, Łódź, Poland | 14–27 | Arena football Friendly game | Loss |
| 14 September 2013 | Netherlands | Polonia Stadium, Warsaw, Poland | 14–37 | Friendly game | Loss |
| 12 September 2015 | Belgium | Stadion GOSiR, Gdynia, Poland | 27–20 | Friendly game | Win |
| 27 September 2015 | Russia | Arena Lublin, Lublin, Poland | 7–0 | Friendly game | Win |
| 11 October 2015 | Czech Republic | Letní stadion, Pardubice, Czech Republic | 7–14 | European Championship Qualifying | Loss |
| 6 August 2016 | Denmark | COS-OPO Cetniewo, Cetniewo, Poland | 35–37 | Friendly game | Loss |
| 10 September 2016 | Sweden | Stadion MOSiR Ząbki, Ząbki, Poland | 21–28 | Friendly game | Loss |
| 24 September 2016 | Hungary | First Field, Székesfehérvár, Hungary | 22–23 | Friendly game | Loss |
| 8 November 2016 | Netherlands | Arena Lublin, Lublin, Poland | 42-14 | Friendly game | Win |
| 22 July 2017 | France | Olympic Stadium, Wrocław, Poland | 2–28 | World Games | Loss |
| 24 July 2017 | United States (USFAF) | Olympic Stadium, Wrocław, Poland | 7–14 | World Games | Loss |
| 16 September 2017 | Switzerland | Arena Lublin, Lublin, Poland | 13–6 | Friendly game | Win |
