= Austria national American football team =

Austria Österreich
- Established: 1982
- League: IFAF Europe
- Colours: Red, grey, white

Personnel
- Head coach: Max Sommer

Current uniform

Home

The Austrian national American football team is the official American football senior national team of Austria and current 2023 European champion. Its players are mostly recruited from the Austrian Football League but a few also play in other European leagues, mostly the German Football League.

== European Championship record ==
The team placed third at the 1995 European Championship of American football (hosted by Austria) and also third place in the 2010 European Championship.

The team placed second at the 2014 European Championship (hosted in Austria), losing the final in double overtime to Germany at Vienna's Ernst-Happel-Stadion and placed second again in 2018.

The 2021 European Championship was less successful for Austria as they unexpectedly lost against Italy in the group phase and thus only placed fifth overall. Austria also placed fifth in the first ever European Championship of American football in 1983.

In 2023 European Championship, Austria defeated Italy 24-14, and then Finland 28-0 to win their first European championship in their history.

- 1983 (5th)
- 1995 (3rd)
- 2010 (3rd)
- 2014 (2nd)
- 2018 (2nd)
- 2021 (5th)
- 2023 (1st)

== IFAF World Championship record ==
Year	Position	GP	W	L	PF	PA
(Italy) 1999	Did not participate					
(Germany) 2003	Did not participate					
(Japan) 2007	Did not participate					
(Austria) 2011	7th	4	1	3	84	94
(United States) 2015	Did not participate					

== Roster ==
Austria National Football team roster
Quarterbacks: 8 Christoph Gross; 13 Thomas Haider; Running backs: 31 Harald Egger; 26 Florian Grein; 23 Florian Hiess; 20 Mario Nerad; 12 Jordan Gurney; Wide receivers: 5 Thimothee Bach; 1 Jakob Dieplinger; 11 Maximilian Herdey; 80 Wolfrum Hofbauer; 17 Stefan Holzinger; 15 Armando Ponce de Leon; 88 Andreas Pröller; 18 Daniel Stanzel	Offensive linemen: 67 Norbert Baumberger OL; 61 Robert Dragotinits OL; 79 Valentin Gruber OL; 70 Michael Habetin OL; 66 Bernd Leitsoni OL; 75 Alexander Milanovic OL; 60 Michael Pribyl OL; 78 Thomas Tippold OL; Defensive linemen: 94 Florian Grünsteidl DL; 99 Johannes Kain DL; 71 Michael Kühnmeyer DL; 89 Roman Meklau DL; 92 Armin Novidi DL; 50 Mario Rinner DL; 90 Alexander Tahiri DL	Linebackers: 49 Simon Blach; 56 Alexander Cucek; 54 Andreas Düringer; 58 Florian Hueter; 47 Dustin Illetschko; 55 Christoph Schilcher; 32 Michael Suess; 10 Philip Stojaspal; Defensive backs: 4 Daniel Auböck DB; 21 Markus Krause DB; 7 Johannes Neusser DB; 30 Christof Promitzer DB; 28 Christoph Putz DB; 24 Manuel Schneeweiss DB; 42 Christoph Schreiner DB; 9 Peter Tutsh DB; Special teams: 2 Peter Kramberger K/P	Inactive list Roster updated 2011-07-11

== Germany Austria series ==
German and Austrian governing bodies AFVD and AFBÖ organize recurring matchups between the two national teams every other year with the first starting in 2022.
