= Gridiron Nations Championship =

American football season

Gridiron-Nationenmeisterschaft (German), Campionato Internazionale di Football Americano (Italian)
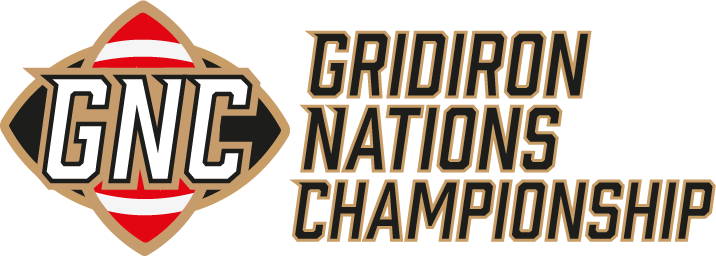

Tournament details
- Host nation: Europe
- Dates: 25 October 2025 – 16 November 2025
- No. of nations: Three

Final positions
- Champions: Canada
- Runner-up: Italy
- Third-place: Germany
- MVP of the tournament: Jamel Lyles, RB Canada

The Gridiron Nations Championship (GNC) is an annual elite international men's American football competition organised independently by participating national federations in alignment with policy frameworks from the International Federation of American Football (IFAF). Modelled on the Six Nations Championship in rugby union, the GNC brings together foundational national teams to compete in a series of matches involving intercontinental play determining a global result.

== History ==
The Gridiron Nations Championship was conceived in early 2025. The initiative was developed to revive and elevate competitive opportunities for senior men's national teams beyond the traditional IFAF World Championship cycle, which had last been held in 2015.

The first edition debuted in April 2025, featuring Canada, Italy, and Germany. On 19 April, Canada travelled to Sardinia and defeated Italy 56-0, which was later reclassified as an IFAF Friendly game.

The first result in the championship was generated at the IFAF European Final Four on 28 October in Krefeld, Germany, where Italy defeated Germany 17-14 to secure the bronze medal in the IFAF Euros. On 9 November, Canada defeated Italy 20-17 at Velodromo Vigorelli in Milan. On 16 November Canada defeated Germany 25-10 in Bochum.

== Format ==
The competition format combines regional play and cross-continental showcase games. Inaugural scheduling included:

- Use of the IFAF European Final Four tournament among Germany, Italy, Austria, and Finland in October 2025 to determine GNC ranking for Italy and Germany.
- Intercontinental friendly matchups with Canada travelling to face Italy (a 56-0 Canada win in Sardinia on 19 April).
- Games with Canada in Italy 9 November and Germany on 16 November.
- Additional fixtures planned to expand participation and create a regular annual schedule.

== Exhibition Games ==
On 13 December 2025, Canada travelled to Mexico City to face the Mexican National Team in what the GNC labelled a "provisional exhibition". The game was to serve as a competitive test on the field, and an organizational one off it to see if the Mexican Federation was ready for further global competition.

Mexico upset the GNC Champion Canada 41-34 in overtime at Estadio Wilfredo Massieu.

== Trophy ==
The GNC Cup is officially known as the Mullin-SFU Alumni Trophy, an 1888 recommissioned English silver trophy crafted by Ashbury & Sons. The trophy was co-donated by Jim Mullin, the commissioner of the GNC and the SFU Football Alumni Association.

== Media and promotion ==
The GNC is supported by international broadcast agreements and promotional partnerships developed by the participating federations. Each federation is responsible for marketing home fixtures, while collective content is distributed globally through social and digital media platforms.

The GNC exhibition between Canada and Mexico was carried on Canal Once across Mexico on TV and streaming platforms.

== See also ==
- IFAF World Championship
- Six Nations Championship
- European Championship of American football
