= 2010 European Championship of American football =

German sporting championship

Tournament details
- Host nation: Germany
- Dates: July 24 – July 31
- No. of nations: 6

Final positions
- Champions: Germany
- Runner-up: France
- Third-place: Austria

The 2010 European Championship was an international American football competition. The European Championship of American football is a continental competition contested by the member countries of EFAF and was held in Germany from July 24 to 31, 2010. The tournament also served as a qualifier for the 2011 IFAF World Championship. Germany, France and Austria qualified.

== Group A ==
=== Standings ===
Teams	W	T	L	P	PF	PA	TD
Germany	2	0	0	4	45	24	5
Austria	1	0	1	2	50	29	7
Finland	0	0	2	0	11	53	1

All times are local (UTC+2)

==== Schedule ====
Quarter	1	2	3	4	Total
Austria	0	6	7	7	20
Germany	10	3	7	2	22

at Commerzbank-Arena, Frankfurt

- Date: July 24, 2010
- Game time: 19:30
- Game weather: 22 °C (72 °F), cloudy
- Game attendance: 7,032
- Referee: (Denmark) Rasmussen
- Gamebook

Quarter	1	2	3	4	Total
Finland	0	7	0	0	7
Austria	7	10	7	6	30

at Stadion Wetzlar, Wetzlar

- Date: July 27, 2010
- Game time: 19:30
- Game weather: 22 °C (72 °F), partly cloudy
- Game attendance: 1,135
- Referee: (Norway) Bolstadt
- Gamebook

Quarter	1	2	3	4	Total
Germany	0	6	14	3	23
Finland	4	0	0	0	4

at Brita-Arena, Wiesbaden

- Date: July 29, 2010
- Game time: 19:30
- Game weather: 18 °C (64 °F), cloudy
- Game attendance: 3,312
- Referee: (Denmark) Rasmussen
- Gamebook

== Group B ==
=== Standings ===
Teams	W	T	L	P	PF	PA	TD
France	2	0	0	4	64	7	7
Sweden	1	0	1	2	21	16	3
Great Britain	0	0	2	0	2	64	0

All times are local (UTC+2)

==== Schedule ====
Quarter	1	2	3	4	Total
France	3	0	11	0	14
Sweden	0	7	0	0	7

at Stadion Wetzlar, Wetzlar

- Date: July 25, 2010
- Game time: 16:00
- Game weather: 20 °C (68 °F), cloudy
- Game attendance: 1,107
- Referee: (Norway) Bolstadt
- Gamebook

Quarter	1	2	3	4	Total
Great Britain	0	0	0	0	0
France	7	15	7	21	50

at Stadion Wetzlar, Wetzlar

- Date: July 27, 2010
- Game time: 16:00
- Game weather: 18 °C (64 °F), cloudy
- Game attendance: 1,002
- Referee: (Denmark) Rasmussen
- Gamebook

Quarter	1	2	3	4	Total
Great Britain	0	2	0	0	2
Sweden	0	7	0	7	14

at Brita-Arena, Wiesbaden

- Date: July 29, 2010
- Game time: 16:00
- Game weather: 18 °C (64 °F), cloudy, chance of rain
- Game attendance: 2,135
- Referee: (Norway) Bolstadt
- Gamebook

== Classification games ==
=== 5th place game ===
Quarter	1	2	3	4	Total
Great Britain	0	0	0	9	9
Finland	0	18	0	14	32

at Commerzbank-Arena, Frankfurt

- Date: July 31, 2010
- Game time: 10:00
- Game weather: 15 °C (59 °F), partly cloudy
- Game attendance: 565
- Referee: (Spain) Rebes
- Gamebook

=== 3rd place game ===
Quarter	1	2	3	4	Total
Sweden	0	0	0	0	0
Austria	0	27	0	3	30

at Commerzbank-Arena, Frankfurt

- Date: July 31, 2010
- Game time: 16:00
- Game weather: 26 °C (79 °F), cloudy
- Game attendance: 3,127
- Referee: (Denmark) Rasmussen
- Gamebook

== Final ==
Quarter	1	2	3	4	Total
France	0	3	7	0	10
Germany	2	10	14	0	26

at Commerzbank-Arena, Frankfurt

- Date: July 31, 2010
- Game time: 19:30
- Game weather: 26 °C (79 °F), cloudy
- Game attendance: 8,523
- Referee: (Norway) Bolstadt
- Gamebook
