= Finland national American football team =

Finland
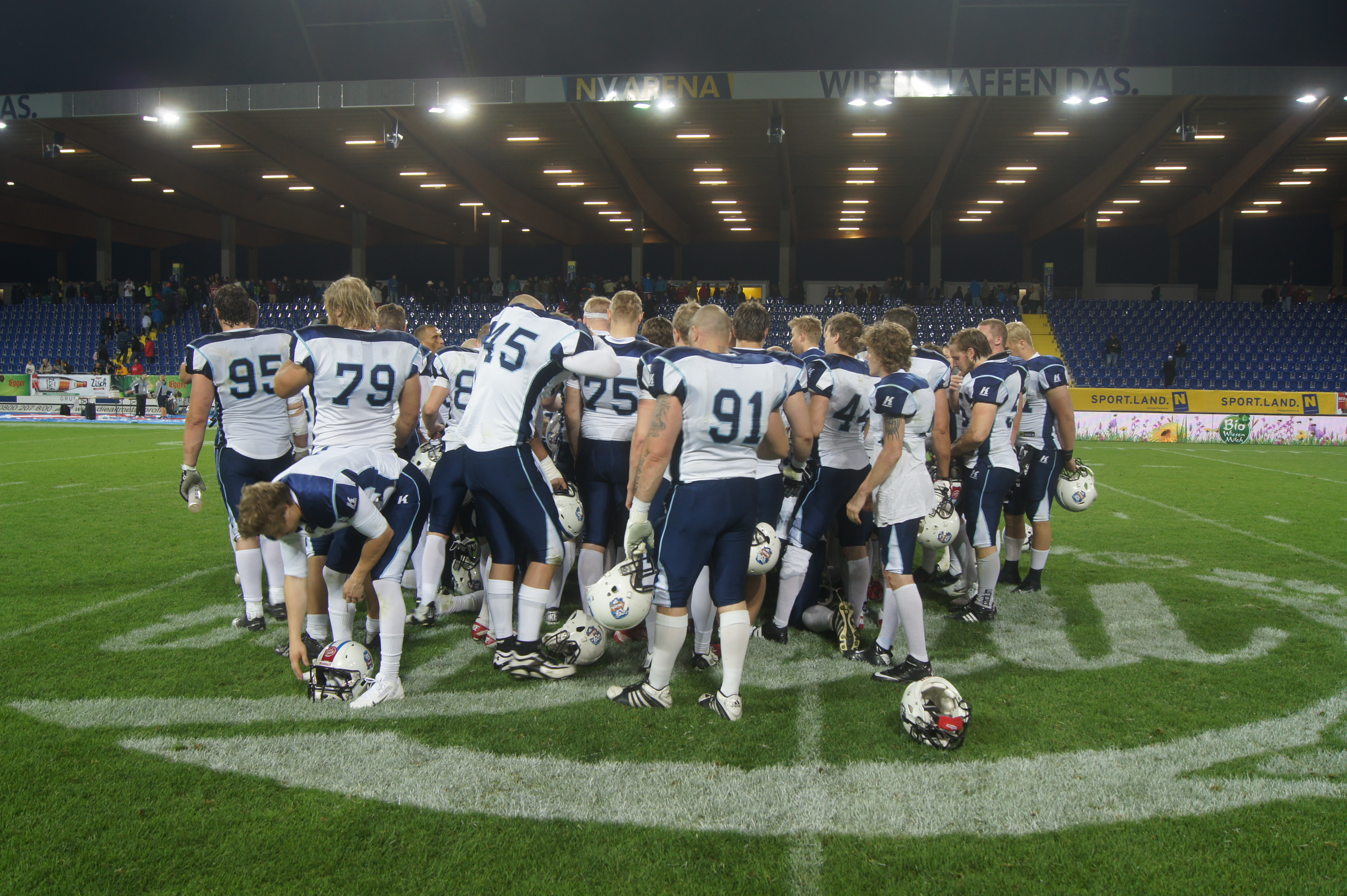
- Association: SAJL
- Region: Europe (IFAF Europe)
- Head coach: Mele Mosqueda

First international
- Finland 52–0 France (Castel Giorgio, Italy; 23 July 1983)

Biggest win
- Norway 7–63 Finland (Helsinki, Finland; 26 April 1995)

Biggest defeat
- Finland 0–89 Mexico (Palermo, Italy; 27 June 1999)

IFAF World Championship
- Appearances: 1 (first in 1999)
- Best result: 6th (1999)

IFAF European Championship
- Appearances: 14 (first in 1983)
- Best result: Gold: 1985, 1993, 1995, 1997, 2000

Finland national American football team
Medal record

Men's American football

Representing Finland

European Championship
Gold medal – first place	1985 Italy	
Gold medal – first place	1993 Italy	
Gold medal – first place	1995 Austria	
Gold medal – first place	1997 Italy	
Gold medal – first place	2000 Germany	
Silver medal – second place	1983 Italy	
Silver medal – second place	1989 West Germany	
Silver medal – second place	1991 Finland	
Silver medal – second place	2001 Germany	
Silver medal – second place	2023 Europe	
Silver medal – second place	2025 Europe	
Bronze medal – third place	1987 Finland	
Bronze medal – third place	2005 Sweden	
Bronze medal – third place	2018 Finland	
Bronze medal – third place	2021 Europe	

The Finnish national American football team is the official American football team for Finland. It is one of the more successful national teams in Europe, having won the European championship a record five times.

== Results ==
=== IFAF World Championship record ===
Year	Position	GP	W	L	PF	PA
(Italy) 1999	6th	3	0	3	14	127
(Germany) 2003	Did not participate					
(Japan) 2007	Did not participate					
(Austria) 2011	Did not participate					
(United States) 2015	Did not participate					
2025	Canceled					

=== European Championship ===
- (Italy) 1983: 2nd
- (Italy) 1985: 1st
- (Finland) 1987: 3rd
- (West Germany) 1989: 2nd
- (Finland) 1991: 2nd
- (Italy) 1993: 1st
- (Austria) 1995: 1st
- (Italy) 1997: 1st
- (Germany) 2000: 1st
- (Germany) 2001: 2nd
- (Sweden) 2005: 3rd
- (Germany) 2010: 5th
- (Austria) 2014: 4th
- (Finland) 2018: 3rd
- (Europe) 2021: 3rd
- (Europe) 2023: 2nd
- (Europe) 2025: 2nd
- (Europe) 2027:
