= 2005 European Championship of American football =

Tournament details
- Host nation: Sweden
- Dates: July 28 – July 30
- No. of nations: 4

Final positions
- Champions: Sweden
- Runner-up: Germany
- Third-place: Finland

The 2005 European Championship of American football was hosted by Sweden between 28 and 30 July 2005. The tournament was played between the three nations from the A-pool and the champion from B-pool played on 2004. The tournament had round-robin qualification. The two top teams won the qualification for the 2007 IFAF World Championship.

== Teams ==
  - Germany (2001 champion)
  - Finland (2001 runner-up)
  - Sweden (host)
  - Great Britain (2004 B-Pool winner)

== Games ==
=== Semifinal ===
Quarter	1	2	3	4	Total
Great Britain	0	0	0	0	0
Germany	7	7	7	13	34

at Malmö Hästhagens IP, Malmö

- Date: July 28, 2005
- Game time: 14:00
- Game attendance: 850

Quarter	1	2	3	4	Total
Finland	9	7	3	0	19
Sweden	0	9	7	7	23

at Malmö Hästhagens IP, Malmö

- Date: July 28, 2005
- Game time: 18:00
- Game attendance: 2000

=== 3rd place ===
Quarter	1	2	3	4	Total
Finland	7	20	7	0	34
Great Britain	0	6	0	6	12

at Malmö Hästhagens IP, Malmö

- Date: July 30, 2005
- Game time: 13:00
- Game attendance: 1000

=== 1st place ===
Quarter	1	2	3	4	Total
Sweden	0	7	0	9	16
Germany	7	0	0	0	7

at Malmö Hästhagens IP, Malmö

- Date: July 30, 2005
- Game time: 18:00
- Game attendance: 2000

== All Star Team ==
Head Coach of the tournament: (Sweden) Kristian Thore

Defensive MVP of the tournament: (Sweden) R Biro #25 CB

Offensive MVP of the tournament: (Germany) J Ullrich #12 QB

MVP of the tournament: (Sweden) CJ Björk #36 MLB

=== First team selections ===
==== Offense ====
Position	Country	No.	Name
LT	(Finland)	59	I Luoto
LG	(Germany)	69	P Hansen
C	(Sweden)	77	CJ Blomwall
RG	(Sweden)	75	E Ahlberg
RT	(Germany)	74	J Pjanic
RB	(Germany)	32	C Poschmann
FB	(Sweden)	35	N Linström
WR	(Sweden)	82	O Dahlman
WR	(Germany)	85	M Schöpf
WR	(Finland)	88	A Wilk
QB	(Germany)	12	J Ullrich

==== Defense ====
Position	Country	No.	Name
DE	(Finland)	92	M Luoma
DE	(Sweden)	91	Carl Carlsson
DT	(Germany)	69	C Königsmann
DT	(Germany)	67	D Engelbrecht
WLB	(Sweden)	38	O Rugeland
MLB	(Sweden)	36	CJ Björk
SLB	(Germany)	5	A Falkowski
CB	(Finland)	26	M Riionheimo
CB	(Sweden)	25	R Biro
SS	(Germany)	19	S Tuch
FS	(Sweden)	27	P Lundqvist

==== Special teams ====
Position	Country	No.	Name
K	(Sweden)	89	J Alnervik
K/P Returner	(United Kingdom)	7	J Simms
