= France national American football team =

Official American football senior national team of France

- France

Home

Away
Association	FFFA
Region	Europe
Founded	1985
Nickname	Dancing Ducks
IFAF Affiliation	1998
Colors	White, blue
Head coach	Patrick Esume

First international
- Finland 52–0 France (Castel Giorgio, Italy; July 23, 1983)

Biggest win
- Austria 0–72 France (Castel Giorgio, Italy; July 26, 1983)

Biggest defeat
- United States 82–0 France (Canton, United States; July 15th 2015)

The France national American football team is the official American football senior national team of France. It is controlled by the Fédération Française de Football Américain (FFFA) and competed for the first time in the IFAF World Championship in 2003.

Their players primarily come from Division 1 Elite Championship in France.

== Championships ==
=== World Games ===
- 2005: Third Place
- 2017: Champions

=== IFAF World Championship record ===
Year	Position	GP	W	L	PF	PA
(Italy) 1999	Did not participate					
(Germany) 2003	4th	2	0	2	13	59
(Japan) 2007	6th	3	0	3	14	67
(Austria) 2011	6th	4	1	3	61	117
(United States) 2015	4th	4	2	2	91	111

=== European Championships ===
- 1983: Fourth place
- 1985: Fourth place
- 1987: Did not participate
- 1989: Did not participate
- 1991: Fourth place
- 1993: Did not qualify
- 1995: Did not qualify
- 1997: Did not qualify
- 2000: Did not qualify
- 2001: Did not qualify
- 2005: Did not qualify
- 2010: Runner-up
- 2014: Third place
- 2018: Champions
- 2021: Fourth place

== Current roster ==
France National Football team roster
Quarterbacks: 7 Joachim Torelli; 16 Léo Cremades; Running backs: 2 Jason Aguemon; 23 Nicolas Khandar; 26 François Pion; 32 Philéas Pasqualini; 40 Florian Monduc; Wide receivers: 5 Rémi Bertellini; 9 Melvin Palin; 11 Gabriel Bisson; 12 Idriss Ramky; 13 Florian Larose; 15 Vincent Monteiro; 81 Lionel Zahariou; 88 François Brémond	Offensive linemen: 59 Bruno Ribeiro; 62 Jeremy Gasparro; 65 Max Gaye; 74 Sébastien Jallier; 77 Thomas Fileccia; 78 Wally Molla Camara; Defensive linemen: 6 Fayade Said; 63 Jean-Claude Mouliom; 91 Anthony Abandlounoux; 93 Olivier Gyan; 94 Willem Dendele; 98 Edwin Elio	Linebackers: 4 Bryan Billy; 8 Paul Veritas; 43 Massimo Pignataro; 47 Lucas Fontenil; 0 Si-Louis; 50 Benjamin Mulindahabi; Defensive backs: 1 Pierre Courageux; 3 Amir Kilani; 10 Louis Tribouley; 18 Kenny Floret; 21 Maxime Roger; 22 Timon Debiez; 24 Maxime de Falcis; 25 Adel Bafdile; 31 Maéric Achiepi; 34 Ibel Ahidazan; 35 Ryan Jouanneau

== All time results ==
Date	Opponent	Result	Venue	Competition
23 July 1983	Finland	0–52	Vince Lombardi Stadium, Castel Giorgio (Italy)	1983 European Championship
26 July 1983	Austria	82–0	Vince Lombardi Stadium, Castel Giorgio (Italy)	1983 European Championship
30 July 1983	Germany	20–27	Vince Lombardi Stadium, Castel Giorgio (Italy)	1983 European Championship
…
31 March 2001	Germany	18–31	Nîmes (France)	2001 European Championship
…
12 October 2002	Sweden	23–0	Kristinebergs IP, Stockholm (Sweden)	2003 IFAF World Championship qualification
26 October 2002	Finland	16–0	Velodrome, Helsinki (Finland)	2003 IFAF World Championship qualification
10 July 2003	Japan	6–23	Stadion an der Berliner Straße, Wiesbaden (Germany)	2003 IFAF World Championship
12 July 2003	Germany	7–36	Herbert Dröse Stadion, Hanau (Germany)	2003 IFAF World Championship
…
7 July 2007	Japan	0–48	Todoroki Athletics Stadium, Kawasaki (Japan)	2007 IFAF World Championship
10 July 2007	Sweden	14–16	Kawasaki Stadium, Kawasaki (Japan)	2007 IFAF World Championship
14 July 2007	South Korea	0–3	Kawasaki Stadium, Kawasaki (Japan)	2007 IFAF World Championship
…
25 July 2010	Sweden	14–7	Stadion Wetzlar, Wetzlar (Germany)	2010 European Championship
27 July 2010	Great Britain	50–0	Stadion Wetzlar, Wetzlar (Germany)	2010 European Championship
31 July 2010	Germany	10–26	Commerzbank-Arena, Frankfurt (Germany)	2010 European Championship (Final)
…
9 July 2011	Canada	10–45	UPC-Arena, Graz (Austria)	2011 IFAF World Championship
9 July 2011	Japan	10–35	UPC-Arena, Graz (Austria)	2011 IFAF World Championship
13 July 2011	Austria	24–16	UPC-Arena, Graz (Austria)	2011 IFAF World Championship
16 July 2011	Germany	17–21	Ernst-Happel-Stadion, Vienna (Austria)	2011 IFAF World Championship
…
2 June 2014	Denmark	52–0	UPC-Arena, Graz (Austria)	2014 European Championship
4 June 2014	Austria	9–24	UPC-Arena, Graz (Austria)	2014 European Championship
4 June 2014	Finland	35–21	Ernst-Happel-Stadion, Vienna (Austria)	2014 European Championship
9 July 2015	Brazil	31–6	Tom Benson Hall of Fame Stadium, Canton (United States)	2015 IFAF World Championship
12 July 2015	Australia	53–3	Tom Benson Hall of Fame Stadium, Canton (United States)	2015 IFAF World Championship
15 July 2015	United States	0–82	Tom Benson Hall of Fame Stadium, Canton (United States)	2015 IFAF World Championship
18 July 2015	Mexico	7–20	Tom Benson Hall of Fame Stadium, Canton (United States)	2015 IFAF World Championship
…
22 July 2017	Poland	28–2	Olympic Stadium, Wrocław (Poland)	2017 World Games
24 July 2017	Germany	14–6	Olympic Stadium, Wrocław (Poland)	2017 World Games (Final)
31 July 2018	Great Britain	42–9	Myyrmäen jalkapallostadion, Vantaa (Finland)	2018 European Championship
2 August 2018	Finland	21–14	Myyrmäen jalkapallostadion, Vantaa (Finland)	2018 European Championship
4 August 2018	Austria	28–14	Myyrmäen jalkapallostadion, Vantaa (Finland)	2018 European Championship (Final)
13 October 2019	Czech Republic	28–3	FC Vysočina, Jihlava (Czech Republic)	2021 European Championship qualification
9 November 2019	Serbia	13–7	Stade Pierre-Mauroy, Villeneuve-d'Ascq (France)	2021 European Championship qualification
30 October 2021	Finland	6–14	Myyrmäen jalkapallostadion, Vantaa (Finland)	2021 European Championship
