= Netherlands national American football team =

- Netherlands

Home

Away
Association	AFBN
Region	Europe (IFAF Europe)
Founded	1987
- IFAF affiliation
Colors	Orange, black, white
Head coach	Fred Armstrong
Team manager	vacant

Netherlands national American football team
Medal record

American football

Representing Netherlands
Bronze medal – third place	1991 Finland	European Championship
Bronze medal – third place	2012 Austria/Switzerland	European C Group Championship
Bronze medal – third place	2016 United Kingdom	European Championship Qualifying Tournament

The Dutch Lions is the Dutch national American Football team. The team represents the Netherlands in international competition and is made up entirely of Dutch national players, typically but not exclusively playing in the AFBN and GFL competitions.

== History ==
The Lions first competed internationally in 1986. After failing to progress further than the first qualification round in 1987 (in Finland) and 1989 (in Germany), they achieved a 3rd-place finish in the 1991 European Championship in Finland. After failing to qualify for the tournament in 1993, combined with upheaval at home within the Dutch governing bodies, the Dutch national team had a long absence from international competition.

Nine years after their previous incarnation, the Dutch returned to the international American Football scene in 2002 under the name Dutch Lions, finishing 5th in the 2003 EFAF C Group European Championship in Denmark after losses to Russia and Italy. Two more losses, this time to Switzerland and Norway in the 2007 EFAF C Group European Championship, led to another 5th place. Five years later, under new head coach Winston Ronde, the Lions improved on those results by finishing 3rd in the 2012 EFAF C Group Championship, this time in Austria, with a close loss to Serbia and a win over Russia.

In 2013 and 2014, the Lions played a series of practice games against Poland, Belgium, Czech Republic and Catalonia, losing only the game against Czech Republic in Prague. In 2015, head coach Winston Ronde resigned, and was replaced by Reyhan Agaoglu. After an away loss in a practice game against Switzerland, the Dutch Lions succeeded in qualifying for the 2016 European Championship Qualifying Tournament by defeating rivals Belgium in Waalwijk.

The Lions played host to Ireland in their first ever international practice game, again in Waalwijk, in 2016 as a warm up to the then-upcoming tournament in the United Kingdom. The Lions were comfortably ahead 20-0 when the game was abandoned early in the third quarter due to lightning.

In September 2016 the Dutch Lions travelled to Worcester, United Kingdom to compete in the qualifying tournament for the 2018 European Championship. Despite leading 13-0 at half time, an injury to quarterback Richard Bouthoorn contributed to a 20-13 loss in the semi-final, thereby ending the dreams of competing in the 2018 finals. The Netherlands bounced back in the bronze medal game to defeat Russia 17-6. The Lions ended the 2016 season by taking a makeshift squad to face Poland in Lublin in an exhibition game, losing 42-14.

In August 2017, American Football Bond Nederland made a decision to put the Dutch Lions programme on hold until 2018. After the resignation of head coach Reyhan Agaoglu, the federation chose Fred Armstrong as a new head coach following the summer break in the same year.

The Dutch Lions have never qualified for the IFAF World Championship.

== Most recent squad (2016) ==
2016 Dutch national American Football team playing squad (qualifying tournament)
Quarterbacks: 5 Richard Bouthoorn (Alphen Eagles); 2 Sven Janssen (Amsterdam Panthers); Running backs: 46 Sean Richard (Amsterdam Crusaders); 26 Kevin Wesseling (010 Trojans); 20 Miquel Castelen (Amsterdam Crusaders); 18 Rody Vink (Spijkenisse Scouts); Wide receivers: 1 Ananias Semedo (Amsterdam Crusaders); 7 Revilinho Graanoogst (Amsterdam Crusaders); 9 Ashneal Werlemann (Amsterdam Crusaders); 11 Dylan van Gerhardt (Amsterdam Crusaders); 86 Jasper van Dooren (London Blitz); 87 Tom van Duijn (Braunschweig Lions); Offensive linemen: 51 Samuel Verweij (Zurich Renegades); 55 Kenny Verlaan (010 Trojans); 60 Joey Odijk (Arnhem Falcons); 61 Stefan Meertens (Amsterdam Crusaders); 62 Ryan Kreijne (Amsterdam Crusaders); 70 Errol Zeefuik (Alphen Eagles); 77 Ishmar Reiph (Alphen Eagles); 78 Barry De Boer (Amsterdam Crusaders)	Defensive linemen: 43 Ricky Tjong-A-Tjoe (San Diego Chargers); 49 Christiaan Van Den Bosch (Hilversum Hurricanes); 54 Kevin Bourne (Amsterdam Crusaders); 79 Dennis Nijmeijer (Amersfoort Untouchables); 88 Peter Van Vliet (Alphen Eagles); 91 Semmie Gyasi-Radji (Lübeck Cougars); 92 Nick Meijers (Troisdorf Jets); 96 Shaquille Peters (Amsterdam Crusaders); 98 Axel Kootstra (North Greenville University); 99 Kevin Verlaan (010 Trojans); Linebackers: 4 Kaspar Bongaerts (Troisdorf Jets); 19 Bas Berkhout (Nijmegen Pirates); 33 Dijohn Ronde (Amsterdam Crusaders); 42 Lennard Harris (Arnhem Falcons); 47 Idemar Benedicas (Alphen Eagles); 53 Bram van Adrichem (010 Trojans); 56 Rajiv Hooi (Amsterdam Crusaders); Defensive backs: 6 Dennis de Wit (Hilversum Hurricanes); 10 Calvin Dey (Amsterdam Crusaders); 21 Nicky Bakker (Amsterdam Crusaders); 24 Chebio Tower (Alphen Eagles); 29 Stephan Van Der Veen (Alphen Eagles); 32 Jose Van Oosten (London Blitz); 38 Daniël Vreugdenhil (Berlin Bears)

== Most recent coaching staff (2016) ==
COACHING STAFF 2016
Name	Position
Reyhan Agaoglu	Head coach / Linebackers
Pepijn Mendonca	Offensive coordinator / quarterbacks coach
Carel Aijelts Averink	Receiver coach
Pascal Matla	Offensive line coach
Orlando Mercelina	Running backs coach
Michel Strom	Defensive coordinator / Defensive line coach
Robbie Hiensch	Defensive backs coach
Steve Sheppard	Special teams coordinator

== Most recent support staff (2016) ==
SUPPORT STAFF 2016
Name	Position
Claudio Bartolozzi	General manager
Dave Sahalessi	Team manager
Dennis Hemelrijk	Equipment manager
Yelmar Opstal	Equipment manager
Jip Regtop	Trainer
Mailys Petrini	Trainer
Danny Gips	Trainer
Kay Constandse	Video crew
Nienke Kers	Video crew

== All time results ==
Date	Opponent	Venue	Result	Competition	Result
2 November 1986	Great Britain	Alexander Stadium, Birmingham, GB	6–9	EFAF European Championship qualifier	Loss
16 November 1986	Great Britain	"The Queen's own" Field, Soesterberg, NL	5–24	EFAF European Championship qualifier	Loss
16 August 1991	Great Britain	Unknown Stadium, Finland	3–49	EFAF European Championship semi-final	Loss
1991	France	Unknown Stadium, Finland	17–12	EFAF European Championship 3rd place	Win
29 October 2002	(Germany) GERManiacs (German Universities)	The Hague, Netherlands	19–18	Exhibition match	Win
29 July 2003	Russia	Glostrup Stadion, Denmark	10–28	EFAF C Group Championship	Loss
31 July 2003	Italy	Glostrup Stadion, Denmark	21–63	EFAF C Group Championship	Loss
14 August 2007	Switzerland	Sportstadion Wolfsberg, Austria	08–40	EFAF C Group Championship	Loss
16 August 2007	Norway	Sportstadion Wolfsberg, Austria	00–27	EFAF C Group Championship	Loss
15 September 2012	Serbia	Gründenmoos Stadium, St. Gallen, Switzerland	14–21	EFAF C Group Championship	Loss
17 September 2012	Russia	Stadion Herrenried, Hohenems, Austria	17–15	EFAF C Group Championship	Win
14 September 2013	Poland	Stadion Polonii, Warsaw, Poland	37–14	Exhibition match	Win
19 July 2014	Belgium	Sportpark de Schorre, Ostend, Belgium	38–13	Exhibition match	Win
6 September 2014	Czech Republic	Slavia Prague Athletic Stadium, Prague, Czech Republic	6–12	Exhibition match	Loss
18 October 2014	Catalonia	Estadi del GEiEG, Girona, Spain	36–26	Exhibition match	Win
19 September 2015	Switzerland	Lachenstadion, Thun, Switzerland	0–12	Exhibition match	Loss
24 October 2015	Belgium	Mandemakers Stadion, Waalwijk, Netherlands	17–3	IFAF B-Group Qualification Match	Win
27 August 2016	Ireland	Mandemakers Stadion, Waalwijk, Netherlands	20-0	Exhibition match	Win
16 September 2016	Czech Republic	Sixways Stadium, Worcester, United Kingdom	13-20	IFAF Euro qualification Tournament Semi-Final	Loss
18 September 2016	Russia	Sixways Stadium, Worcester, United Kingdom	17–6	IFAF Euro Qualification Tournament Third Place Game	Win
8 October 2016	Poland	Arena Lublin, Lublin, Poland	42–14	Exhibition match	Loss
10 November 2018	Belgium	Shotgun field, Beringen, Belgium	14–7	Exhibition match	Loss

== See also ==
- List of American football teams in the Netherlands
