= Myyrmäen jalkapallostadion =

Football stadium in Vantaa, Finland

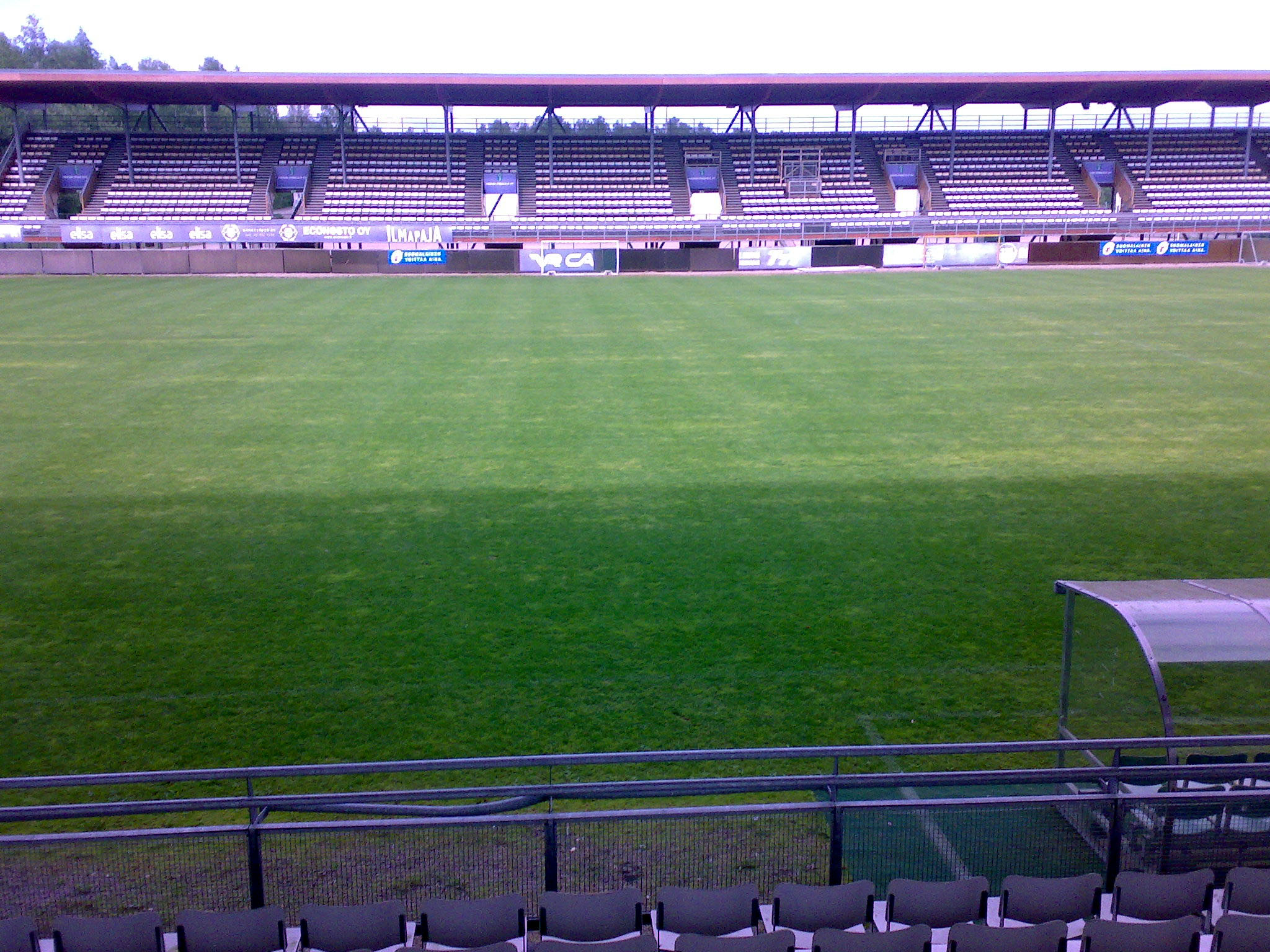
- Interactive map of Myyrmäen jalkapallostadion
- Former names: ISS Stadion, Pohjola Stadion
- Location: Myyrmäki, Vantaa, Finland
- Coordinates: 60°15.726′N 24°50.291′E
- Capacity: 4,320
- Field size: 105 m x 68 m

Construction
- Built: 2000
- Opened: 2000

Tenants
- VJS, Pallokerho-35)

Myyrmäen jalkapallostadion (Myyrmäki Football Stadium) (Swedish: Myrbackas fotbollsstadion), formerly ISS Stadion and Pohjola Stadion, is a football stadium in the Myyrmäki district of Vantaa, Finland. It is the homeground of PK-35 Vantaa, its women's representative team plays in the top-tier Kansallinen Liiga. The stadium holds 4,700 and was built in 2000.

The IFAF 2018 European Championship of American football was held in Myyrmäen jalkapallostadion between 29 July - 4 August 2018.

== Specs ==
- Pitch: Artificial turf
- Pitch dimensions: 105*68
- Floodlights: 1,500 lux

== See also ==
- Energia Areena
