= Germany national American football team =

- Germany Deutschland

Home

Away
Association	AFVD
Region	Europe (IFAF Europe)
Founded	1981
IFAF Affiliation	2000
Colors	Black, red and yellow
Head coach	Peter Springwald
- General manager

The Germany national American football team, nicknamed the Men in Black, is the official American football senior national team of Germany. They are organized by the American Football Association of Germany. They get their players from teams of the German Football League (GFL). They are the only national team to have beat the United States men's national American football team, winning 13-14.

== Results ==
=== IFAF World Championship record ===
Year	Position	GP	W	L	PF	PA
(Italy) 1999	Did not participate					
(Germany) 2003	3rd	2	1	1	53	28
(Japan) 2007	3rd	3	2	1	46	35
(Austria) 2011	5th	4	2	2	73	107
(United States) 2015	Did not participate					

=== European Championships ===
- 1983: Third place
- 1985: Third place
- 1987: Runner-up
- 1989: Third place
- 1991: Did not qualify
- 1993: Third place
- 1995: Did not participate
- 1997: Did not qualify
- 2000: Runner-up
- 2001: Champions
- 2005: Runner up
- 2010: Champions
- 2014: Champions
- 2018: Excluded after qualification
- 2021: Did not participate
- 2023: B Pool
- 2025: Fourth Place

=== World Games ===
- 2005: Champions
- 2017: Runner-up

=== Gridiron Nations Championship ===
- Germany 10 Canada 25, 16 November 2025

(Germany finished third in GNC).

== Current roster ==
Germany National Football team roster
Quarterbacks: 19 Gary Lautenschlager; 12 Joachim Ullrich; Running backs: 31 Jerome Morris; 21 Waldemar Schander; 2 Danny Washington; Wide receivers: 87 Christian Bollmann WR; 29 Felix Brenner WR; 81 Julian Dohrendorf WR; 3 Danilo Naranjo González WR; 85 Dominic Hanselmann WR; 6 Pascal Maier WR; 89 Alexej Mittendorf TE; 84 Niklas Römer WR; 30 Christian Welker TE	Offensive linemen: 69 Georg Bechtold OL; 66 Oliver Beeck OL; 61 Lars Hampel OL; 62 Nils Hampel OL; 58 Hannes Irmer OL; 74 Raphael Llanos-Farfan OL; 60 Sascha Sauer OL; 50 Nick Wieland OL; Defensive linemen: 76 Hendrik Bleier DL; 94 Maximilian Grewe DL; 65 Pascal Hogenberg DL; 70 Paul Krems DL; 78 Milan Misic DL; 92 Thomas Rauch DL; 99 Sven Rieger DL; 96 Robert Zernicke DL	Linebackers: 45 Rick Baunacke; 44 Simon Brenner; 56 Albert Langebartels; 41 Mario Nowak; 54 Steve Nzeocha; 13 Jasson Scott; Defensive backs: 26 Matthias Eck DB; 7 Leonard Greene DB; 20 Falk Horn DB; 32 Karl Michel DB; 25 Oliver Radke DB; 22 Mario Schmitt DB; 4 Roman Solovij DB; 33 Clemens Sommerfeld DB; Special teams: 15 Dennis Wiehberg K/P	Inactive list Roster updated 2011-07-07
