= 2007 IFAF World Championship =

American football tournament

Tournament details
- Host nation: Japan
- Dates: July 7 – July 15
- No. of nations: 6

Final positions
- Champions: United States (1st title)
- Runner-up: Japan
- Third-place: Germany

The 2007 IFAF World Championship was the third instance of the IFAF World Championship, the quadrennial international American football world championship tournament. It was held on July 7–15, 2007 in Kawasaki, Kanagawa, Japan.

== Venues ==
Todoroki Athletics Stadium	Kawasaki Stadium
Kawasaki, Kanagawa	Kawasaki, Kanagawa
25,000	2,700

== Participants ==
- Japan (qualify automatically as host)
- Sweden (European champion)
- Germany
- United States (invitee)
- France
- South Korea (winner of Asia/Oceania playoff)

== Matches ==
=== Group 1 ===
Team	Played	Won	Lost	Points for	Points against
Japan	2	2	0	96	0
Sweden	2	1	1	16	62
France	2	0	2	14	64

Quarter	1	2	3	4	Total
France	0	0	0	0	0
Japan	16	8	15	9	48

at Todoroki Athletics Stadium

- Date: July 7, 2007
- Game time: 18:10
- Game weather: Cloudy
- Game attendance: 12336
- Referee: (United States) Bill LeMonnier
- Box score

Quarter	1	2	3	4	Total
France	7	0	7	0	14
Sweden	0	7	9	0	16

at Kawasaki Stadium

- Date: July 10, 2007
- Game time: 15:00
- Game weather: Rain
- Referee: (United States) Bill LeMonnier
- Box score

Quarter	1	2	3	4	Total
Sweden	0	0	0	0	0
Japan	21	10	7	10	48

at Kawasaki Stadium

- Date: July 12, 2007
- Game time: 19:00
- Game weather: Cloudy
- Game attendance: 4093
- Referee: (United States) Bill LeMonnier
- Box score

=== Group 2 ===
Team	Played	Won	Lost	Points for	Points against
United States	2	2	0	110	7
Germany	2	1	1	39	35
South Korea	2	0	2	2	109

Quarter	1	2	3	4	Total
Germany	14	5	0	13	32
South Korea	0	0	2	0	2

at Kawasaki Stadium

- Date: July 8, 2007
- Game time: 17:00
- Game weather: Fine
- Game attendance: 2632
- Referee: (Sweden) Fereed Adus
- Box score

Quarter	1	2	3	4	Total
South Korea	0	0	0	0	0
United States	28	14	28	7	77

at Kawasaki Stadium

- Date: July 10, 2007
- Game time: 19:00
- Game weather: Rain
- Game attendance: 2077
- Referee: (Sweden) Fereed Adus
- Box score

Quarter	1	2	3	4	Total
United States	16	0	3	14	33
Germany	0	7	0	0	7

at Kawasaki Stadium

- Date: July 12, 2007
- Game time: 15:00
- Game weather: Cloudy/intermittent rain
- Referee: (Sweden) Fereed Adus
- Box score

=== 5th place ===
Quarter	1	2	3	4	Total
France	0	0	0	0	0
South Korea	0	0	0	3	3

at Kawasaki Stadium

- Date: July 14, 2007
- Game time: 15:00
- Game weather: Rain
- Referee: (Sweden) Fereed Adus
- Box score

=== 3rd place ===
Quarter	1	2	3	4	Total
Sweden	0	0	0	0	0
Germany	0	0	7	0	7

at Kawasaki Stadium

- Date: July 14, 2007
- Game time: 19:00
- Game weather: Rain
- Game attendance: 1943
- Referee: (United States) Bill LeMonnier
- Box score

=== Final ===
Quarter	1	2	3	4	OT	2OT	Total
Japan	0	10	0	7	3	0	20
United States	7	0	3	7	3	3	23

at Todoroki Athletics Stadium

- Date: July 15, 2007
- Game time: 15:10
- Game weather: Rain
- Game attendance: 10231
- Referee: (Germany) Peter Springwald
- Box score

The United States competed for the first time in the 2007 IFAF World Cup. Japan was making their third appearance in the finals, winning the previous two World Championships. Japan took a 17-10 lead with seven minutes and seven seconds left in regulation. University of Arizona quarterback Adam Austin guided Team USA with an 11-play, 80-yard drive that ended with the second 5-yard touchdown run by RB Kyle Kasperbauer, to tie the game at 17. IFAF follows the overtime system used by the NCAA, and both teams scored field goals with their first OT possession. In the second overtime, Japan got the ball first but missed a 34-yard field goal attempt. Team USA then reached Japan's 6-yard line. On 4th and one, Craig Coffin kicked the game winning 22-yard field goal, with the final score at 23-20. University of Nebraska-Omaha running back Kyle Kasperbauer was named MVP of the game after scoring two touchdowns and running for 54 yards on 15 carries.

- 0-7 Kasperbauer 5 yard run (Coffin kick) (1-9:03)
- 7-7 Kihira 2 yard pass from Tomizawa (Kaneoya kick) (2-10:51)
- 10-7 Kaneoya 49 yard field goal (2-8:02)
- 10-10 Coffin 35 yard field goal (3-4:18)
- 17-10 Mayuzumi 6 yard pass from Tomizawa (Kaneoya kick) (4-7:07)
- 17-17 Kasperbauer 5 yard run (Coffin kick) (4-2:51)
- 17-20 Coffin 43 yard field goal (OT1-0:00)
- 20-20 Kaneoya 25 yard field goal (OT1-0:00)
- 20-23 Coffin 22 yard field goal (OT2-0:00)

Attendance: 10,231

Team Statistics Japan USA

----- ---

First Downs 13 14

Rushing Plays 34 32 Net Yards Rushing 92 128

Attempts-Completions 25-17 12-25 Net Yards Passing 166 109

Fumbles Lost 1 3 Interceptions 1 1

Penalties-Yards 1-15 3-30

Time of Possession 27:45 20:15

Individual statistics

Rushing: Japan - Furutani 13-61, Ishino 3-15, M. Maeda 4-7, Namiki 2-6, Shimizu 3-5, Tomizawa 2-2, Takata 7-(-4)

USA - Kasperbauer 15-65, Blakowski 10-55, W. Johnson 4-13, Austin 3-(-5)

Passing: Japan - Tomizawa 20-14-140-2-0, Takata 4-3-26-0-1, Nakajima 1-0-0-0-0

USA - Austin 25-12-109-1-0

Receiving: Japan - Hasegawa 3-37, Nakajima 3-29, Furutani 3-23, Shimizu 2-24, Yoneyama 2-12, Mayuzumi 2-11, M. Maeda 1-28, Kihira 1-2

USA - Drenckhahn 5-40, Lewis 2-20, Odom 2/19, Thompson 1-13, Awrey 1-11, Childs 1-6

== Winner ==
2007 IFAF World Cup winners
United States
First title

== Statistics ==
Pos	Team	Games	Win	Lose	Points for	Points against	Difference
1st place, gold medalist(s)	United States	3	3	0	133	27	+106
2nd place, silver medalist(s)	Japan	3	2	1	116	23	+93
3rd place, bronze medalist(s)	Germany	3	2	1	46	35	+11
4	Sweden	3	1	2	16	69	-53
5	South Korea	3	1	2	5	109	-104
6	France	3	0	3	14	67	-53
