= Denmark national American football team =

The Denmark national American football team is the official American football senior national team of Denmark. The national American football team is governed by the Danish American Football Federation.

== IFAF World Championship record ==
Year	Position	GP	W	L	PF	PA
(Italy) 1999						
(Germany) 2003
(Japan) 2007
(Austria) 2007
(United States) 2015	Did not qualify					
