= Italy national American football team =

Italy
- Association: FIDAF
- Head coach: Brian Michitti
- Home stadium: Velodromo Vigorelli, Milan
- Team colours

First international
- West Germany 12-0 Italy (Castel Giorgio, Italy; June 14, 1981)

Biggest win
- Italy 84-0 Austria (Castel Giorgio, Italy; July 24, 1983)

Biggest defeat
- Canada 56–0 Italy (Cagliari, Italy; April 19, 2025)

IFAF World Championship
- Appearances: 1 (first in 1999)
- Best result: Fourth (in 1999)

International record (W–L–T)
- 35-35-11

Italy national American football team
Medal record

Men's American football

Representing Italy

Gridiron Nations Championship
Silver medal – second place	2025 Europe	Team competition

The Italy national American football team, nicknamed the Blue Team, is the national American football team for Italy. They have been successful, having won the European championship three times, and finishing runners-up three times. They won the 2021 IFAF European Championship, its third European title, having also won in 1983 and 1985.

In response to the 2022 Russian invasion of Ukraine, the Italy national American football team refused to play against Russia that October in a qualifier for the 2023 IFAF European Championships.

Italy was one of the founding nations of the 2025 Gridiron Nations Championship, the first global tournament featuring IFAF teams since the 2015 IFAF World Championships. On 9 November at Velodromo Vigorelli, Italy lost to Canada 20-17. Combined with their win over Germany on 28 October, Italy finished second.

In the most recent GNC World Ranking Italy was ranked fourth of all active national teams based on Elo.

== IFAF World Championship record ==
Year	Position	GP	W	L	PF	PA
(Italy) 1999	4th	3	1	2	41	99
(Japan) 2007	Did not participate					

== Gridiron Nations Championship record ==
Year	Position	GP	W	L	PF	PA
(European Union) 2025	2nd	1	1	0	37	37
