= IFAF Europe =

Governing body of American football in Europe

International Federation of American Football Europe
- Membership: 28 (March 2022)
- Abbreviation: IFAF Europe
- Chairperson: Gregor Murth

Official website
- www.ifaf-europe.org

IFAF Europe is the governing body of American football in Europe. It is a member of the International Federation of American Football. IFAF Europe replaced the European Federation of American Football (EFAF) which had begun in 1976 as the American European Football Federation (AEFF).

IFAF Europe organises competitions for American football for men, women, and 16- to 19-year-olds. Additionally, they organise flag football for men, women, and under-15 and under-17.

In response to the 2022 Russian invasion of Ukraine, IFAF Europe suspended Russia from the competitions as Italy, the then-IFAF Europe title holders, refused to play against Russia that October in a qualifier for the 2023 IFAF European Championships.

== Events ==
- European championship, every four years
- European U-19 Championship, every two years
- European Women's tackle football championship, every four years
- IFAF European Flag Football Championship (men and women), every two years
- Under-15 and Under-17 European Flag football championships (men and women), every two years

== Members ==
=== Full members ===
- Austria
- Denmark
- Finland
- France
- Germany
- Great Britain
- Israel
- Italy
- Norway
- Slovenia
- Spain
- Sweden
- Switzerland

=== Associate members ===
- Belgium
- Czech Republic
- Hungary
- Ireland
- Netherlands
- Poland
- Russia
- Serbia
- Slovakia
- Turkey
- Ukraine

=== Allied members ===
- Belarus
- Croatia
- Georgia
- Luxembourg
- Malta

== See also ==
- NFL Europe
