= Sweden national American football team =

- Sweden

Home

Away
Association	Swedish American Football Association
Region	Europe (IFAF Europe)
Founded	1984
- IFAF affiliation
Colors	Blue, yellow
Head coach	Andreas Ehrenreich
- General manager

Sweden national American football team
Medal record

Representing Sweden

Men's American football

World Games
Silver medal – second place	2005 Duisburg	Team competition

World Championship
Bronze medal – third place	1999 Italy	Team competition

European Championship
Gold medal – first place	2005 Sweden	Team competition
Silver medal – second place	1997 Italy	Team competition
Silver medal – second place	2021 Europe	Team competition

The Swedish national American football team is the official American football team for Sweden. They came in third place in the first IFAF World Championship in 1999, did not participate in 2003, and came in fourth in 2007. They are members of IFAF Europe.

== Results ==
=== IFAF World Championship record ===
Year	Position	GP	W	L	PF	PA
(Italy) 1999	3rd	3	2	1	74	43
(Germany) 2003	Did not participate					
(Japan) 2007	4th	3	1	2	16	69
(Austria) 2011	Did not participate					
(United States) 2015	Did not participate					

=== European Championships ===
- 1983:
- 1985:
- 1987:
- 1989:
- 1991:
- 1993:
- 1995:
- 1997: Runner-up
- 2000: Did not qualify
- 2001:
- 2005: Champions
- 2010: Fourth place
- 2014: Fifth place
- 2018: Fourth place
- 2021: Runner-up
- 2013: Fourth place
