= 2018–2019 Israel Football League season =

Twelfth season of the Israel Football League

2018–2019 IFL season
- League: Israel Football League
- Sport: American football

Israel Bowl XII
- Champions: Jerusalem Lions
- Runners-up: Petah Tikva Troopers

IFL seasons
- ← 2017–2018 2019–2020 →

The 2018–2019 Israel Football League season was the 12th season of the Israel Football League. The season began on November 15, 2018 and concluded on February 28, 2019 with IsraBowl XII. This season was the first to feature full eleven-man games after previously playing nine-man football. The season also marked the return of the Ramat HaSharon Hammers, who were on hiatus during the 2017–2018 season.

The Jerusalem Lions defeated the Petah Tikva Troopers in IsraBowl XII to secure their third straight championship.

== Regular season ==
Pos	Team	Pld	W	L	PF	PA	PD
1	Jerusalem Lions	9	9	0	387	89	+298
2	Petah Tikva Troopers	9	8	1	414	143	+271
3	Haifa Underdogs	9	6	3	267	147	+120
4	Tel Aviv Pioneers	9	5	4	176	200	−24
5	Judean Rebels	9	3	6	144	340	−196
6	Be'er Sheva Black Swarm	9	3	6	225	338	−113
7	Mazkeret Batya Silverbacks	9	1	8	153	279	−126
8	Ramat HaSharon Hammers	9	1	8	140	370	−230
