= 2019–20 Israel Football League season =

Thirteenth season of the Israel Football League

2019–2020 IFL season
- League: Israel Football League
- Sport: American football

Israel Bowl XIII

IFL seasons
- ← 2018–2019 2021 →

The 2019–2020 Israel Football League season was the 13th season of the Israel Football League. The season began on November 28, 2019 and was scheduled to conclude on March 19, 2020 with IsraBowl XIII. However, after the regular season concluded all games were postponed until further notice due to the COVID-19 pandemic.

== Regular season ==
Team	W	L	PF	PA	PD
Jerusalem Lions	10	0	446	130	+316
Ramat HaSharon Hammers	7	3	379	248	+131
Be'er Sheva Black Swarm	5	5	241	301	−60
Judean Rebels	4	6	245	332	−87
Haifa Underdogs	4	6	180	139	+41
Tel Aviv Pioneers	4	6	165	286	−121
Mazkeret Batya Silverbacks	1	9	129	349	−220

Source: http://www.israel-football.co.il/ifl/
