= Israel national American football team =

- Israel ישראל

Home

Away
Association	AFI
Region	Europe (IFAF Europe)
Founded	2012
- IFAF affiliation
Colors	Blue and White
Head coach	Yonah Mishaan
Defensive coordinator	Lewis Henry Esler Duker
General manager	Neria Granevich

The Israel national American football team is the official American football senior national team of Israel. The team was formed in 2012, mainly with Israel Football League players and coaching staff.

== First game ==
The first international American football game played by Israel was played on 17 May 2012 in Baptist village near Petah Tikva, when the Israel national team met Maranatha Baptist University. For Israeli players it was the first-ever game on a 100-yard field in an 11 player team. In the IFL, American football is played on 60-yard fields by 9 player teams (in 2012, the IFL played with 8 player teams). The game finished with a 49 - 6 Maranatha win.

== Playing squad ==
2015 Israel national American Football team playing squad (vs Spain)
Quarterbacks: 5 Matt Kauffman (Haifa Underdogs); 13 Alex Swieca (University of Michigan Wolverines); Running backs: 33 Isaac Saslavsky (Tel Aviv Pioneers); 34 Ndavyah Williams (Haifa Underdogs); 41 Yuval Penta (Kfar Saba); Wide receivers: 10 Binyamin Shultz (Jerusalem Lions); 11 Yonatan Curran (Ramat HaSharon Hammers); 19 Nimrod Smith (Haifa Underdogs); 80 Cameron Simmonds (Tel Aviv Pioneers); 88 Gideon Reiz (Judean Rebels); Tight ends: 82 Amit Kolton (Haifa Underdogs); 84 Shmuel Halpern (Jerusalem Lions); 89 Adam Davis (Ramat HaSharon Hammers); Offensive linemen: 51 Yonatan Eliyahu (Judean Rebels); 60 Aviram Cohen (Raanana); 68 Erez Pahima (Judean Rebels); 72 Amir Nakar (Haifa Underdogs); 75 Elad Ohana (Ramat HaSharon Hammers); 76 Ehud Sharon (Judean Rebels); 79 Yaniv Kovalsky (Judean Rebels) LS	Defensive linemen: 47 Sandro Kalandadze (Beer Sheva Black Swarm); 50 Leon Gikher (Haifa Underdogs); 65 Eyal Franfurter (Judean Rebels); 67 Avia Shermak (Tel Aviv Pioneers); 78 Uria Loberbom (Judean Rebels); 97 Evyatar Hacohen (Rehovot Silverbacks); 98 Idan Melchior (Beer Sheva Black Swarm); 99 Yizhak Manshuri (Petah Tikva Troopers); Linebackers: 42 Or Shalom (Tel Aviv Pioneers); 52 Asaf Katz (Tel Aviv Pioneers); 53 Niv Medlinger (Haifa Underdogs); 56 Jeremiah Jelski (Judean Rebels); 64 Noam Dalal (Tel Aviv Pioneers); Defensive backs: 20 Dani Eastman (Judean Rebels); 21 Ariel Back (Judean Rebels); 22 Ehud Klein (Beer Sheva Black Swarm); 23 Ori Rafaelovich (Jerusalem Lions); 24 Jason Hess (Judean Rebels); 28 Guy Halberthal (Haifa Underdogs); 31 Mica Allon (Haifa Underdogs); Special teams: 7 Gal Mesika (Tel Aviv Pioneers) K/P

== European Championship of American football ==
=== 2018 European Championship ===
The first official game in EFAF competitions took place on 30 August 2015 in Madrid. The opponents were Spain from EFAF C Group European Championship. As a new entrant, Israel could earn its way into Group B. Israel won the game 28–20.

Israel then played in the four-team Group B European Championship in Italy in September 2016 with the winner of the four-team tournament eligible for another qualifying round against either Denmark or Sweden, the sixth and fifth place of the 2014 championship respectively, to the A Championship, then planned to be held in Germany in 2018.

The Israel delegation of 45 players and 18 coaches was the largest ever Israeli delegation sent international for a single sport competition.

Date	Opponent	Venue	Final score	Competition	Result	MVP
30 August 2015	Spain	Prado de Santo Domingo, Madrid, ESP	28 - 20	EFAF European Championship Qualifier for Group B	Win	Dani Eastman
2 September 2016	Italy	Lignano Sabbiadoro, ITA	10 - 40	EFAF European Championship Group B Semifinal	Loss	
4 September 2016	Switzerland	Lignano Sabbiadoro, ITA	0 - 51	EFAF European Championship Group B third place match	Loss	

== See also ==
- American football in Israel
- Israel Football League
