= 2012–2013 Israel Football League season =

Sixth season of the Israel Football League

2012–2013 IFL season
- League: Israel Football League
- Sport: American football

Israel Bowl VI
- Champions: Tel Aviv-Jaffa Sabres
- Runners-up: Judean Rebels

IFL seasons
- ← 2011–2012 2013–2014 →

The 2012–2013 Israel Football League was the sixth season of the Israel Football League (IFL). The league expanded to 11 teams as the Rehovot Silverbacks became the newest expansion franchise. The Tel Aviv-Jaffa Sabres became the first team in IFL history to go undefeated throughout the regular season and postseason and the season concluded with the Sabres defeating the Judean Rebels in Israel Bowl VI.

== Regular season ==
The regular season consisted of 10 games for each team and the division format was left behind in favor of a schedule in which every team played every other team once.

Pos	City	Team	Pld	W	L	PF	PA	PD
1	Tel Aviv	Sabres	10	10	0	664	76	+588
2	Tel Aviv	Pioneers	10	9	1	516	217	+299
3	Ramat HaSharon	Hammers	10	8	2	416	158	+258
4	Jerusalem	Lions	10	6	4	424	304	+120
5	Efrat	Rebels	10	5	5	364	272	+92
6	Jerusalem	Kings	10	5	5	414	353	+61
7	Haifa	Underdogs	10	5	5	335	277	+58
8	Be'er Sheva	Black Swarm	10	4	6	386	512	−126
9	Petah-Tikva	Troopers	10	2	8	200	518	−318
10	Nahariya	Northern Stars	10	1	9	97	549	−452
11	Rehovot	Silverbacks	10	0	10	54	634	−580

== Playoffs ==
The wild card round saw both underdog teams come out victorious, including the Kings' Hail Mary pass to beat the Hammers. In the semifinals, the Sabres crushed the Kings and the Rebels upset the Pioneers in 100+ degree heat.

=== Wild Card games ===
- Hammers 46 – 50 Kings
- Lions 42 – 50 Rebels

=== Semi-finals ===
- Pioneers 34 – 38 Rebels
- Sabres 60 – 6 Kings

== Israel Bowl VI ==
The Sabres and Rebels went toe-to-toe in Israel Bowl VI, but the Sabres pulled away midway through the third quarter, and held on for their second straight title.

- Sabres 48 - 26 Rebels

== Awards ==
- Most Valuable Player: Dani Eastman, WR/DB/RS/QB, Judean Rebels
- Offensive Player-of-the-Year: Adi Hakami, QB, Tel Aviv/Jaffa Sabres
- Defensive Player-of-the-Year: Gilad Shoham, DE, Ramat Hasharon Hammers
- Special Team Player-of-the-Year: Liran Zamir, K/P, Judean Rebels
- Coaching Staff-of-the-Year: Ramat Hasharon Hammers
- Offensive Rookie-of-the-Year: Jordan Curran, QB, Ramat Hasharon Hammers
- Defensive Rookie-of-the-Year: Mor Kalomiti, DB, Petah Tikva Troopers
