= Bergen Storm =

American football team in Norway

- Founded: 1992
- League: Division II
- Team history: Bergen Blackhawks (1992); Bergen Storm (1993-present)
- Based in: Bergen, Norway
- Stadium: Varden Kunstgress
- Colors: Red, White and Black
- President: Jesper Haug Karsrud
- Championships: AFN Division II: 1996, 2009

The Bergen Storm is an American football team based in Bergen, Norway. Bergen Storm is the third-oldest existing team in Norwegian American football. They are members of the Norges Amerikanske Idretters Forbund (NAIF) Amerikansk Fotball Norge (AFN) Division II. The team plays its home games at Varden Kunstgress field in Bergen.

== Facts ==
Founded: 1992 (as Bergen Blackhawks) when Bergen Bulldogs and Bergen Flyers merged.

Team colors: Cardinal red and white

President: Jesper Haug Karsrud.

Best results: Senior: 3rd place 1st division (1993), U-19: Runner-up champions (1999, 2000, 2001), U-16: National Champion (2004, 2005).

Noted rivalries: Nidaros Domers (Bergen Vs Trondheim), VIF Trolls (junior championship games), Åsane Seahawks (Best in town games)

== Teams ==
Senior Players of age 18 and up. Have participated every official season since 1993 with the exception of 1998. Best standing is currently 3rd place 1st division (1993) and winner 2nd division (1996 and 2009).

U-19 Players in the age group 16–19. Participated in the Norwegian U-19 championship since 1995, with the exception of 1998. Best standing is Norwegian vice-champions in 1999, 2000 and 2001, each year losing the championship final to the VIF Trolls.

U-17 Players in the age group 14–16. Participated in the Norwegian U-16 championship since 2003. Best standing is Norwegian Champions in 2005 when the Bergen team beat VIF Trolls 8–7.

Storm Cheerleaders Participated in the Norwegian Championship for Cheerleaders in 2005 finishing last. Program got canceled after this season. New program is currently starting up.

Bergen Storm Thunder One of the Bergen Storm teams during the 'split' in 2005 as an effort to create local league play in Norwegian 2nd division versus Bergen Storm Blizzard and Åsane Seahawks. Thunder became the only winner of the Bergen Bowl by beating Bergen Storm Blizzard in the final. The team was officially coached by Eirik Talhaug.

Bergen Storm Blizzard One of the Bergen Storm teams during the 'split' in 2005 as an effort to create Bergen league play in the Norwegian 2nd division versus Bergen Storm Thunder and Åsane Seahawks. Blizzards were runners-up in the only Bergen Bowl final. The team was coached by Bård Strøm, Thomas Midtun and Arild Hauge.

== Associated clubs or teams ==
Os Wolverines Bergen Storm had tight connections with Os Wolverines. Os is an independent club based in Os Kommune south of Bergen. The Wolverines participated in the Norwegian 2nd division once in 2010 under the name Hordaland Storm. Since then they have been active in the regional 8-man league in the fall. The two clubs shared some coaching and resource personnel. Amongst others, Christian Detjen, head coach for the Os Wolverines was a board member and U-19 head coach with Bergen Storm, while Bjarte Eide Aase who was assistant coach with Storm in 2013.

Navy Valkyries The Naval Academy in Bergen fielded their own 8-man football team. However, the academy is not a registered club within the Federation of American Sports in Norway, thus all players are licensed through Bergen Storm. Notable Bergen Storm player Markus Johannessen is one of the Valkyries key players. Long time Bergen Storm player, coach and president Atle Mølholm was at a time hired by the Naval Academy as a coach for the Valkyries as well.

NHHI Capitalists The Norwegian School of Economics has their own team registered with the Federation of American Sports. So far, NHHI has only participated in the local 8-man league as well as the interstudent athletic competition (2013). NHHI is thus an independent club but Bergen Storm and NHHI has allowed for players to play for both clubs. Long time Bergen Storm player Robert Fredriksen is served as a coach and resource person for the NHHI Capitalists.

== 8-man league ==
The 8-man league (2008 - 2014) was a regional low-cost league for eight-man football in Hordaland, which was tremendously popular with more than 100 licensed players during a season, fielding more than 100 players total in a single season. The 8-man has been a Bergen Storm initially driven by then club president Thomas Midtun. The league consists of different teams mainly associated with the four clubs in the region: Bergen Storm, Åsane Seahawks, Kvernbit Knights and Os Wolverines. The Bergen Storm-organized teams have been:

Bergen Replacements A team participating in the Bergen 8-man football league. Mainly consisting of retired Bergen Storm players. Bergen Bowl winner of 2008 going undefeated through the season. Runner-up in 2009 going undefeated through regular season. Led by Eirik Talhaug, Thomas Midtun and Hallvard Hollevik

Bergen Gators / Bergen Sackademics / Bergen Beavers A team participating in the Bergen 8-man football league. Mainly consisting of current or new members of Bergen Storm. Bergen Bowl 2009 champions and Bergen Bowl 2008 runner-up. Moved forth to Bergen Sharks, thus leaving the Bergen Storm organization in favor of Åsane Seahawks. Led by Sondre Johan Haugsdal Riisøen.

Bergen Leftovers A team that participated in the Bergen 8-man football league in 2008. Led by Finn Olsen.

8-man league winners

- 2014: Åsane Seahawks
- 2013: Os Wolverines
- 2012: Replacements
- 2011: Replacements
- 2010: Bergen Sackademics
- 2009: Bergen Gators
- 2008: Replacements

== History line ==
- pre 1992: A merge between Bergen Bulldogs and Bergen Flyers in 1992. The team became Bergen Blackhawks and performed well, landing the team as no. 3 in Norwegian 1st division.
- 1992 - 1994: Coach Joe Spinella Took over the team as a head coach. The team had their so far best record in this era. no:Jon Torstein Bakken was president of the club.
- 1995-1998: Bergen Storm failed to perform very well and was tormented by instability and changes of presidents and coaches. With the exception of 1996, Bergen Storm did not manage to complete a single season. On the brighter side, the era saw the birth of Storm U-19 and the 2nd division championship winner for seniors.
- 1999 - 2001: Kaj Hopland, Rolf Endresen and Atle Mølholm created stability for the club as coaches and an efficient board. Bergen Storm competed in the 2nd division in 1999 - 2001. During this time Bergen Storm U-19 noted their best records as vice-champions three years in a row.
- 2002-2004: Bergen Storm senior made a three-year run into the 1st division but was clearly seen to small to compete against the better Norwegian teams Eidsvoll 1814s, Oslo Vikings, and VIF Trolls. Bergen Storm launched their first U-16 program and Bergen Storm Cheerleading became active.
- 2005 - 2009: Bergen Storm decided to move back into the 2nd division for the 2005 season. An experiment was made to split the Bergen team into two teams: Blizzard and Thunder, to compete in a 3-team conference along with Åsane Seahawks. Only one formal game got played and a joint Storm team traveled to Hamar Ruins to take on the 2nd division championship game, which the Ruins won. 2006 saw the first paid coach for Bergen Storm when Timo Sorri was brought in to help out Bergen Storm. 2007 and 2008 has been played in 2nd division with local coaching and personnel. In 2009 former NFL draft pick and South Carolina standout Ryan Bethea took charge of the team going 4–0 in the second division. Bergen Storm won their first Championship on any level when Storm won the U-16 championship in '05. 2008 also saw the first season of the 8-man regional football league in Bergen, with five teams participating: Bergen Replacements, Bergen Gators, Bergen Leftovers, Åsane Seahawks and Kvernbit Knights.
- 2010–2013: The Bergen Storm side decided to move back up into the 1st division in 2010 under the leadership of 2nd year HC Ryan Bethea. Bergen Storm assembled a team consisting of players from Storm, the Kvernbit Knights and Os Wolverines. The club fielded Norwegian players only playing the local quarterback Øyvind Haugland as starter. The team went 1–5 through the season after an 8–6 upset win over the VIF Trolls in Oslo. Peter Holmberg succeeded as HC for Bergen Storm in 2011 and 2012. In addition, Bergen Storm brought in American import players for the first time in team history. The team went 2–4 through 2011 season with a double win over the Nidaros Domers which qualified for the last spot in play-offs.. Further, Bergen Storm went 3–3 in 2012 after beating the Nidaros Domers, VIF Trolls and AFC Show but did not qualify for playoffs due to the increased number of participating teams in the league. In 2013, the team saw much reorganizing and finished the season 0–7. Despite beating championship runners-up Kristiansand Gladiators 14–9 Storm were ruled to lose all first three games of the season 0–30 due to an administrative penalty for fielding an illegal transferred player. However, the team saw a reduction in the junior program in this period of time. The U-16 program folded after 2010 campaign and the U-19 program did not manage to field a team for the 2012 campaign after reaching playoffs in 2011 under the leadership of Christian Detjen. Bergen Storm Cheerleading increased both in size and quality during this time and won the national championship in cheerleading for one category in 2012.
- 2014, 2015: Bergen Storm sat out from organized football in 2014, except for fielding Bergen Storm for the first time as a united team in the regional 8-man league. In 2015, Storm participated once again in national league play at 2nd division, finishing the season in 4th place after a 3–3 record.

== Notable people ==
- Atle Mølholm - Club president 2002–2005. coach and player. NoAF All-star team safety. Bergen Storm All Star '93-'03 WR.
- Eskild Risnes - Head coach '96, NoAF All-Star team DE, Bergen Storm All-Star '93-'03 DE. Retired Jersey #99.
- Kaj Hopland - Club president '98-'00, Head Coach sr '98-'02, Head Coach U-19 '03, Bergen Storm All-Star '93-'03 QB. Bergen Storm Honor Award '03 for longest playing record.
- Bård Strøm - Club President '05 and 2014, head coach sr '03-'05 and 2013, head coach U-19 '99-'00 and '02, Norway U-19 offensive coordinator '00 and '02. Cal Poly Mustangs football assistant coach '01, World Team assistant coach 2011. Norway National Team assistant coach 2015–2016. AFN coaches instructor.
- Thomas Midtun - Club president '01, '06,08 and 09'. Head Coach Sr '06-'08, Head Coach U-19 '01, Norway U-19 offensive coordinator '04
- Stig Schjerpen - Bergen Storm All-Star '93-'03 tight end, head coach U-16 '04-'06
- Erik Nødtvedt - Bergen Storm wide receiver and wide receiver coach. Member of Norwegian Flag football national team participating in the 2012 flag football world championship. Oslo Vikings wide receiver 2009.
- Joseph Spinella - Head coach Senior team '92-'94.
- no:Jon Torstein Bakken - Club president '93 - '95, Head Coach U-19 '96
- Tor-Arne Torsvik - Bergen Storm All-Star '93-'03 LB, MVP Defense Nordic Championship '02
- Timo Sorri - Head coach Sr '06
- Ronny Nilsen - Bergen Storm All-Star '93 - '03 DT, Bergen Storm Honor Award '03 for longest playing record.
- Ryan Bethea - Head coach Bergen Storm senior team 2009–2010. Head Coach Bergen Storm U-19 2009. #138 overall draft pick of the 1988 NFL Draft by the Minnesota Vikings. Former South Carolina University wide receiver.
- Peter Holmberg -, Head coach Bergen Storm senior 2011 and 2012.
- Sigbjørn Tveiterås - Club president from 2013. Norwegian Champion with Oslo Vikings.
- Jannice Hope - Long time board member and club president in 2012.

== Head coaches Bergen Storm Senior ==
- Amund Klem rønning (2015)
- Bård Strøm (2013)
- Peter Holmberg (2011, 2012)
- Ryan Bethea (2009, 2010)
- Thomas Midtun (2007, 2008)
- Timo Sorri (2006)
- Bård Strøm (2003–2005)
- Kaj Hopland (1999 - 2002)
- Rolf Endresen (1997)
- Eskild Risnes (1996)
- no:Jon Torstein Bakken (1995)
- Joseph Spinella (1993, 1994)

== Import history of Bergen Storm ==
- 2013 Nate Poppell QB/OC, Texas A&M Kingsville (NCAA DIV-II)
- 2013 Pat O'Neill LB/DC, University of Rhode Island (NCAA DIV-1AA)
- 2012 Dan McClellan DB/WR, Millersville University (NCAA DIV-II)
- 2012 Clifford Harris QB/RB, Duke University (FBS: NCAA DIV-I)
- 2012 Brandon Jordan OL/DL, Missouri S&T (NCAA DIV-II)
- 2011 Jordan Green QB/WR, Webber International University (NAIA)
- 2011 Jeremy Vannice LB/DL, Friends University (NAIA)
