= 2017–2018 Israel Football League season =

Eleventh season of the Israel Football League

2017-2018 IFL season
- League: Israel Football League
- Sport: American football

Israel Bowl XI
- Champions: Jerusalem Lions
- Runners-up: Petah Tikva Troopers
- Finals MVP: David Abell

IFL seasons
- ← 2016–2017 2018–2019 →

The 2017–2018 Israel Football League season was the 11th season of the Israel Football League. Only seven teams competed this season, with the Ramat HaSharon Hammers going on hiatus. The season concluded with the Jerusalem Lions defeating the Petah Tikva Troopers, 28-20, in Israel Bowl XI.

== Regular season ==
The regular season consisted of ten games, with the top six teams qualifying for the playoffs. The Lions earned the top seed in the playoffs with an undefeated record.

Pos	Team	Pld	W	L	PF	PA	PD
1	Jerusalem Lions	10	10	0	399	159	+240
2	Judean Rebels	10	7	3	264	269	−5
3	Petah Tikva Troopers	10	5	5	332	391	−59
4	Haifa Underdogs	10	5	5	143	121	+22
5	Tel Aviv Pioneers	10	4	6	326	316	+10
6	Mazkeret Batya Silverbacks	10	2	8	149	198	−49
7	Be'er Sheva Black Swarm	10	2	8	148	307	−159

== Playoffs ==
The Troopers defeated the Silverbacks while the Pioneers upset the Underdogs in the Wild Card Round. In the Semifinals, the Lions defeated the Pioneers and the Troopers upset the Rebels. Israel Bowl XI took place on March 22, 2018 at the Kraft Family Sports Campus, with the Lions defeating the Troopers 28-20 and David Abell being named Israel Bowl MVP for the second year in a row.

Wild Card Round
4	Haifa Underdogs	6
5	Tel Aviv Pioneers	28
3	Petah Tikva Troopers	38
6	Mazkeret Batya Silverbacks	6

Semifinals
1	Jerusalem Lions	54
5	Tel Aviv Pioneers	12
2	Judean Rebels	30
3	Petah Tikva Troopers	46

Israel Bowl XI
1	Jerusalem Lions	28
3	Petah Tikva Troopers	20
