= History of American football in Norway =

American football in Norway began in 1949 when students from two secondary schools (videregående) in Oslo—at Riis and Ullern—began playing an annual gridiron game, starting with a meeting on October 30. An Associated Press report from Oslo the next day noted that a crowd of 500 watched, and that the introduction of the sport was credited to "Alf Stenere, former Norwegian exchange student to Bowdoin College, and Tony Bower of Kansas City, 17-year old student here". Reportedly, Riis won the first game, 20–13.

== Norwegian American Football Federation ==
In 1983, the Norwegian American Football Federation (NAFF), or Norges Amerikanske Fotboll Forbund (NAFF) in Norwegian, was founded, fielding the Norwegian national American football team. The Norwegian national teamplayed its first international game in Stockholm, Sweden, and won 38–0. An article of the game appeared in the Norway's second largest newspaper Dagbladet, on January 28, 1985. For the first American football Scandinavian Cup in Stockholm, to be played between Sweden, Finland, and Norway, Norway became the champion. An article on the Cup appeared in SAGA, Norway's English-language newspaper, on September 19, 1985.

On May 9, 1986, the Norwegian national team played and defeated the Coventry Bears American Football Club of the British American Football League (BAFL) in England.

The Norwegian national team lost for the first time when St. Olaf College from Minnesota was invited to Oslo in 1986, St. Olaf shutting out Norway 65–0.

The Norwegian national team traveled to Minnesota to play St. Olaf College again. Like their first game, Norway lost 65–0; the St. Olaf players intentionally decided not to run up the score on their visitors. An article of the game appeared in the local newspaper called The News, Northfield, Minnesota, on July 21, 1988.

St. Olaf College arranged for the Norwegian players to visit the Minnesota Vikings training camp and to socialize with the professional players of American football.

== NAIF ==
In 2010, the NAFF merged with multiple federations to form the Norwegian Federation of American Sports aka the Norges Amerikanske Idretters Forbund (NAIF). The NAIF governs American football, flag football, cheerleading, lacrosse, and disc sports in Norway. It is also a member of the Norwegian Olympic Committee.

== League competitions ==
Currently, men's senior competitions for American football in Norway are divided into three levels:

- Eliteserien (Elite Series)
  - Oslo Vikings
  - Åsane Seahawks
  - Eidsvoll 1814s
  - Vålerenga Trolls
  - Lura Bulls
- Division I
  - Kristiansand Gladiators
  - Sarpsborg Olavs Menn
  - Kolbotn Hunters
  - Haugesund Hurricanes
- Division II
  - Gjøvik Swans
  - Fredrikstad Kings
  - Tønsberg Raiders
  - Lillestrøm Starfighters

New teams are usually placed in Division II and can be promoted to Division I. Likewise, teams in the Division I can also be promoted to the Eliteserien through team performance. However, there is no standardized system for promotion or relegation between the leagues. Usually, teams are placed in their leagues based on evaluation of their talent, performance, finances, and overall organizational health.

== Defunct teams ==
- Tromsø Trailblazers
