= 2014–2015 Israel Football League season =

Eighth season of the Israel Football League

2014–2015 IFL season
- League: Israel Football League
- Sport: American football

Regular season
- Season MVP: Dani Eastman

Israel Bowl VIII
- Champions: Judean Rebels
- Runners-up: Tel Aviv Pioneers
- Finals MVP: Dani Eastman

IFL seasons
- ← 2013–2014 2015–2016 →

The 2014–2015 Israel Football League season was the eighth season of the Israel Football League (IFL) and concluded with the Judean Rebels defeating the Tel Aviv Pioneers, 20–10, in Israel Bowl VIII.

== Regular season ==
The regular season saw the Judean Rebels earn the top seed in the postseason with an undefeated record.

Pos	Team	Pld	W	L
1	Judean Rebels	9	9	0
2	Tel Aviv Pioneers	9	8	1
3	Haifa Underdogs	9	6	3
4	Ramat HaSharon Hammers	9	5	4
5	Jerusalem Lions	10	5	5
6	Petah Tikva Troopers	9	3	6
7	Mazkeret Batya Silverbacks	10	3	7
8	Be'er Sheva Black Swarm	10	3	7
9	Jerusalem Kings	9	0	9

== Playoffs ==
In the Quarterfinals, the Hammers defeated the Lions and the Underdogs defeated the Troopers. In the Semifinals, the Rebels defeated the Hammers and the Pioneers defeated the Underdogs. In Israel Bowl VIII, the Rebels completed a perfect season by defeating the Pioneers 20–10. Dani Eastman was named Israel Bowl MVP.

Quarterfinals
4	Ramat Hasharon Hammers	42
5	Jerusalem Lions	38
3	Haifa Underdogs	42
6	Petah Tikva Troopers	14

Semifinals
1	Judean Rebels	16
4	Ramat Hasharon Hammers	12
2	Tel Aviv Pioneers	26
3	Haifa Underdogs	20

Israel Bowl VIII
1	Judean Rebels	20
2	Tel Aviv Pioneers	10

* Indicates overtime victory

== Awards ==
- Most Valuable Player: Dani Eastman, RB/DB/RS, Judean Rebels
- Offensive Player of the Year: Avrami Farkas, QB, Judean Rebels
- Defensive Player of the Year: Sandro Kalandadze, DE/LB, Beersheva Black Swarm
- Special Team Player of the Year: Elan Neiger, RS/P, Tel Aviv Pioneers
- Coaching Staff of the Year: Haifa Underdogs
- Offensive Rookie of the Year: Jason Armstead, RB, Haifa Underdogs
- Defensive Rookie of the Year: Rudy Rattner, DE, Haifa Underdogs
- Howie Osterer Sportsmanship Award: Dani Eastman, Judean Rebels
