= 2010–2011 Israel Football League season =

Fourth season of the Israel Football League

2010–2011 IFL season
- League: Israel Football League
- Sport: American football

Israel Bowl IV
- Champions: Judean Rebels
- Runners-up: Tel Aviv Sabres

IFL seasons
- ← 2009–2010 2011–2012 →

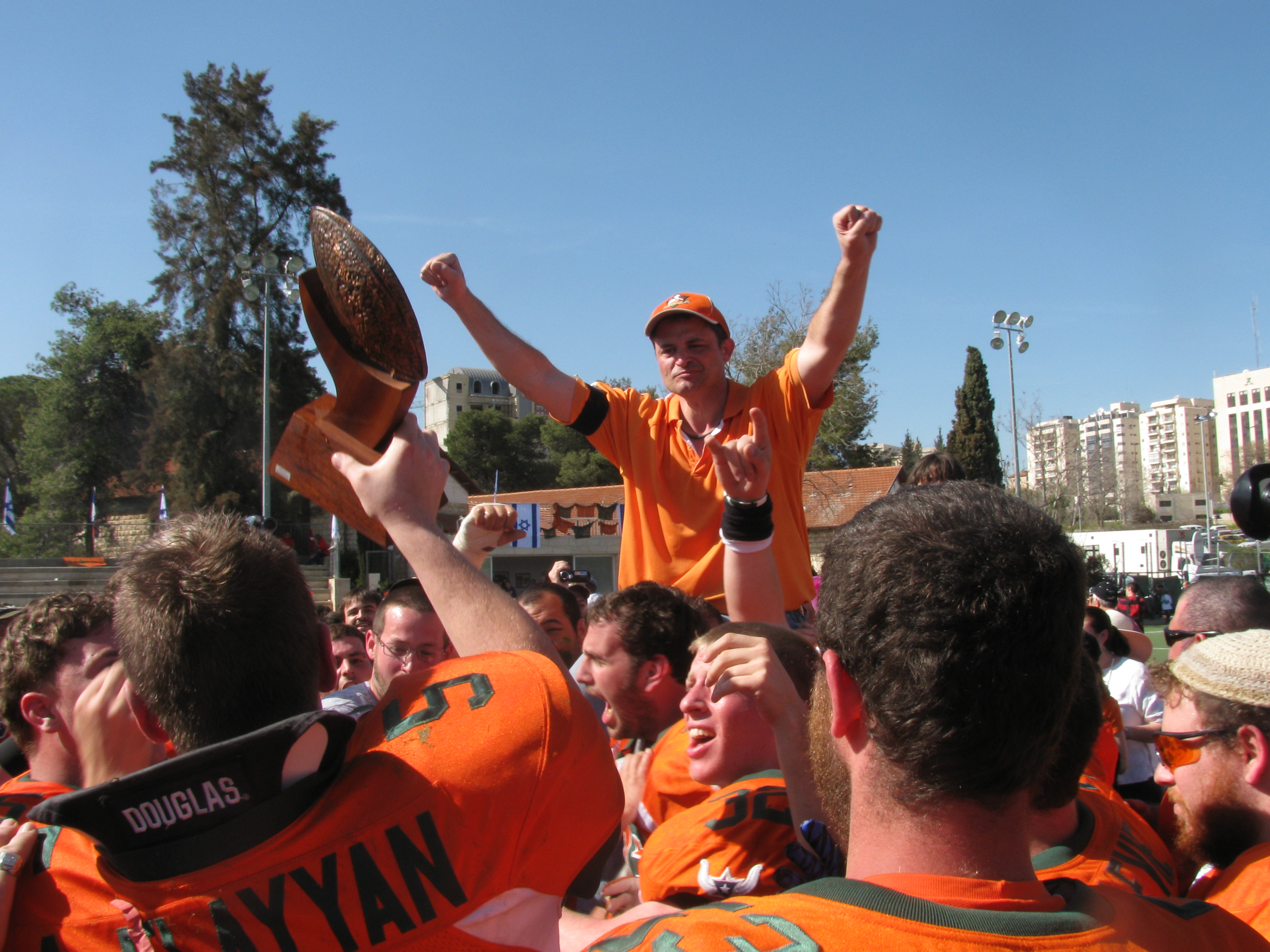
Judean Rebels with Becker Trophy, celebrating the victory in Israel Bowl IV

The 2010–2011 Israel Football League season was the fourth season of the Israel Football League (IFL). The league expanded to eight teams with the expansion team Herzliya Hammers and was divided in two divisions: North and South.

== Regular season ==
The regular season consisted of ten games for each team. Two games (home and away) against each team within the same division, and one game against each of the teams from the other division.

North
Pos	City	Team	Pld	W	L	PF	PA	PD
1	Tel Aviv	Tel-Aviv Sabres	10	8	2	436	206	+230
2	Tel Aviv	Tel Aviv Pioneers	10	7	3	346	192	+154
3	Herzliya	Herzliya Hammers	10	3	7	204	450	−246
4	Haifa	Haifa Underdogs	10	1	9	190	383	−193

South
Pos	City	Team	Pld	W	L	PF	PA	PD
1	Jerusalem	Jerusalem Lions	10	9	1	372	188	+184
2	Efrat	Judean Rebels	10	8	2	448	254	+194
3	Be'er Sheva	Be'er Sheva Black Swarm	10	3	7	252	362	−110
4	Jerusalem	Jerusalem Kings	10	1	9	199	406	−207

== Playoffs ==
=== Wild Card games ===
North

- Pioneers 50 – 16 Hammers

South

- Rebels 44 – 12 Black Swarm

=== Division Championships ===
North

- Sabres 26 – 16 Pioneers

South

- Lions 42 – 46 Rebels

== Israel Bowl IV ==
Sabres 30 – 32 Rebels

== Awards ==
- Most Valuable Player: Alex Swieca, QB, Judean Rebels
- Offensive Player-of-the-Year: Itay Ashkenazi, QB, Jerusalem Lions
- Defensive Player-of-the-Year: Jeremy Sable, LB, Tel Aviv/Jaffa Sabres
- Coach-of-the-Year: Betzalel Friedman, Judean Rebels
- Rookie-of-the-Year: Sagan Zavelo, DB, Tel Aviv Pioneers
- Newcomer-of-the-Year: Jenya Gluzman, DL, Tel Aviv Pioneers
