= 2009–2010 Israel Football League season =

Third season of the Israel Football League

2009–2010 IFL season
- League: Israel Football League
- Sport: American football

Regular season
- Season MVP: Jon Rubin

Israel Bowl III
- Champions: Tel Aviv-Jaffa Sabres
- Runners-up: Jerusalem Lions
- Finals MVP: Evan Reshef

IFL seasons
- ← 2008–2009 2010–2011 →

The 2009–2010 Israel Football League season was the third season of the Israel Football League (IFL). This season featured two expansion teams (Beersheva Black Swarm and Judean Rebels) and concluded with the Tel Aviv-Jaffa Sabres defeating the Jerusalem Lions, 26–22, in Israel Bowl III.

== Regular season ==
The regular season began in October 2009 and consisted of a ten game schedule. The top six teams made the playoffs, with the top two seeds receiving a first round bye for the playoffs.

Pos	Team	Pld	W	L
1	Tel Aviv-Jaffa Sabres	10	9	1
2	Jerusalem Kings	10	6	4
3	Jerusalem Lions	10	6	4
4	Judean Rebels	10	6	4
5	Haifa Underdogs	10	4	6
6	Modi'in Pioneers	10	4	6
7	Be'er Sheva Black Swarm	10	0	10

== Playoffs ==
The Wild Card Round saw the Rebels defeat the Underdogs and the Lions defeat the Pioneers. In the Semifinals, the Sabres crushed the Rebels 70–30 while the Lions also picked up a huge win with their 50–6 upset of the Kings. Israel Bowl III took place on March 26, 2010 before a nationally televised audience, with the Sabres defeating the Lions 26–22 and Evan Reshef earning Israel Bowl MVP.

Wild Card Round
4	Judean Rebels	46
5	Haifa Underdogs	20
3	Jerusalem Lions	42
6	Modi'in Pioneers	30

Semifinals
1	Tel Aviv-Jaffa Sabres	70
4	Judean Rebels	30
2	Jerusalem Kings	6
3	Jerusalem Lions	50

Israel Bowl III
1	Tel Aviv-Jaffa Sabres	26
3	Jerusalem Lions	22

* Indicates overtime victory

== Awards ==
- Most Valuable Player: Jon Rubin, RB, Jerusalem Kings
- Offensive Player of the Year: Joe Martisius, QB, Judean Rebels
- Coach of the Year: Jon Sharon, Tel Aviv-Jaffa Sabres
