= 2013–2014 Israel Football League season =

Seventh season of the Israel Football League

2013–2014 IFL season
- League: Israel Football League
- Sport: American football

Regular season
- Season MVP: Dani Eastman

Israel Bowl VII
- Champions: Tel Aviv Pioneers
- Runners-up: Jerusalem Lions
- Finals MVP: Ronny Moscona

IFL seasons
- ← 2012–2013 2014–2015 →

The 2013–2014 Israel Football League season was the seventh season of the Israel Football League (IFL) and concluded with the Tel Aviv Pioneers defeating the Jerusalem Lions, 80–28, in Israel Bowl VII.

== Regular season ==
The regular season consisted of a nine-game schedule. The Rebels finished the season undefeated and earned the top seed for the playoffs.

Pos	Team	Pld	W	L
1	Judean Rebels	9	9	0
2	Ramat HaSharon Hammers	9	7	2
3	Jerusalem Lions	9	7	2
4	Tel Aviv Pioneers	9	6	3
5	Petah Tikva Troopers	9	5	4
6	Haifa Underdogs	9	4	5
7	Jerusalem Kings	9	4	5
8	Be'er Sheva Black Swarm	9	2	7
9	Northern Stars	9	1	8
10	Rehovot Silverbacks	9	0	9

== Playoffs ==
In the Wild Card round, the Pioneers defeated the Troopers while the Lions defeated the Underdogs. In the Semifinals, the top two seeds were upset, with the Pioneers defeating the Rebels and the Hammers defeating the Lions. In Israel Bowl VII, the Pioneers crushed the Lions 80–28, with Ronny Moscona earning Israel Bowl MVP honors.

Wild Card
4	Tel Aviv Pioneers	50
5	Petah Tikva Troopers	28
3	Jerusalem Lions	64
6	Haifa Underdogs	34

Semifinals
1	Judean Rebels	32
4	Tel Aviv Pioneers	38
2	Ramat Hasharon Hammers	36
3	Jerusalem Lions	42

Israel Bowl VII
3	Jerusalem Lions	28
4	Tel Aviv Pioneers	80

* Indicates overtime victory

== Awards ==
- Most Valuable Player: Dani Eastman, RB/DB/RS, Judean Rebels
- Offensive Player of the Year: Dani Eastman, RB, Judean Rebels
- Defensive Player of the Year: Yoni Cooper, DE, Jerusalem Lions
- Special Team Player of the Year: Jonathan Curran, RS/P, Ramat HaSharon Hammers
- Coaching Staff of the Year: Judean Rebels
- Offensive Rookie of the Year: Avrami Farkas, QB, Judean Rebels
- Defensive Rookie of the Year: Elie Mendlowitz, DB, Judean Rebels
