= 2015–2016 Israel Football League season =

Ninth season of the Israel Football League

2015–2016 IFL season
- League: Israel Football League
- Sport: American football
- Duration: November 6, 2015 – April 14, 2016

Regular season
- Season MVP: David Abell

Israel Bowl IX
- Champions: Judean Rebels
- Runners-up: Tel Aviv Pioneers
- Finals MVP: Dani Eastman

IFL seasons
- ← 2014–2015 2016-2017 →

The 2015–2016 Israel Football League season was the ninth season of the Israel Football League (IFL). It concluded with the Judean Rebels defeating the Tel Aviv Pioneers, 32-14, in Israel Bowl IX.

== Regular season ==
The regular season began on November 6, 2015 and consisted of a ten game schedule, with the Judean Rebels earning the top seed for the playoffs.

Pos	Team	Pld	W	L
1	Judean Rebels	10	8	2
2	Jerusalem Lions	10	8	2
3	Tel Aviv Pioneers	10	7	3
4	Haifa Underdogs	10	7	3
5	Ramat HaSharon Hammers	10	4	6
6	Be'er Sheva Black Swarm	10	3	7
7	Mazkeret Batya Silverbacks	10	2	8
8	Petah Tikva Troopers	10	1	9

== Playoffs ==
In the quarterfinals, the Underdogs defeated the Hammers while the Pioneers defeated the Black Swarm. In the semifinals, the Rebels defeated the Underdogs and the Pioneers upset the Lions to set up a rematch of Israel Bowl VIII. In Israel Bowl IX, the Rebels defeated the Pioneers to win their second consecutive championship. Dani Eastman was named Israel Bowl MVP.

Quarterfinals
4	Haifa Underdogs
5	Ramat Hasharon Hammers
3	Tel Aviv Pioneers
6	Beersheva Black Swarm

Semifinals
1	Judean Rebels	64
4	Haifa Underdogs	28
2	Jerusalem Lions	12
3	Tel Aviv Pioneers	16

Israel Bowl IX
1	Judean Rebels	32
3	Tel Aviv Pioneers	14

* Indicates overtime victory

== Awards ==
Most Valuable Player: David Abell, QB, Jerusalem Lions
