= American football in Israel =

- Country: Israel
- Governing body: American Football in Israel
- National team: Israel
- First played: 1988

American football is a sport played at the amateur and international competition levels in Israel. The Israel Football League (IFL) is the highest level of competition in Israel, although there are multiple flag football leagues, a high school league and a youth league. All forms of American football in Israel are governed by American Football in Israel (IFL). As of February 2017, there were 1,350 active football players living in Israel.

== American Football in Israel ==
American Football in Israel (AFI) is a non-profit association formed in 1998. In 2004 it was officially recognized by Ministry of Education's Sports Authority in Israel. Since this recognition, it is the sport’s official governing body for all American Football activities within Israel.

AFI is a member of the International Federation of American Football.

== Israel Football League ==
The Israel Football League (IFL) was founded in the summer of 2005 by a group of Israelis, led by Ofri Becker, who wanted to play tackle American football. The first season was played without pads or an official governing body. In 2007, the league began fully equipped play under the umbrella of AFI, and Israel Bowl I was held in 2008.

== Israel national American football team ==
The Israel national American football team represents Israel in international men's American football competitions. The team formed in 2012 and consisted of mostly Israel Football League players and coaching staff. The first international American football game played by Israel was played May 17, 2012 in Baptist village near Petah Tikva, when the Israeli national team met Maranatha Baptist Bible College.

== Competitions ==
The first official game in EFAF competitions took place at 30 August 2015 in Madrid. The opponents was Spain national American football team from EFAF C Group European Championship. As a new entry Israel could earn its way into Group B. Israel won the game 28-20.

Israel will thus play in the four team Group B European Championship in Italy in September 2016 with the winner of the four team tournament eligible for another qualifying round against either Denmark or Sweden, the sixth and fifth place of the 2014 championship respectively, to the A Championship to be held in Germany in 2018.

== Kraft Family ==
New England Patriots owner Robert Kraft is the largest donor to Israeli American Football initiatives.

Kraft has donated millions of dollars to the Israeli Football League. Additionally due to his generosity the American Football stadium in Jerusalem is called the Kraft Family Stadium, the only American Football stadium in Israel. Kraft's wife Myra Kraft has donated millions of dollars to women’s Flag Football in Israel.

On an annual basis Kraft also brings NFL players and other celebrities to Israel, including Tom Brady in 2006. In 2015 Kraft brought 19 Pro Football Hall of Fame members with him, including: Raymond Berry, Mel Blount, Tim Brown, Curley Culp, Chris Doleman, John Hannah, Mike Haynes, Ken Houston, Paul Krause, Floyd Little, Tom Mack, Curtis Martin, Ron Mix, Jim Taylor, Thurman Thomas, Andre Tippett, Roger Wehrli, Rayfield Wright, and Jack Youngblood. In 2017 Kraft brought Calais Campbell of the Arizona Cardinals, Dan Williams of the Oakland Raiders, Cameron Jordan of the New Orleans Saints, Delanie Walker of the Tennessee Titans, and Mychal Kendricks of the Philadelphia Eagles.

In 2014, during Operation Protective Edge, a soldier from the Los Angeles area, Max Steinberg, was killed in action. Upon hearing that Steinberg was a Patriot’s fan, Robert Kraft wrote a letter to the family offering his condolences. In November 2015, Ezra Schwartz, from Sharon, Massachusetts, was killed in a terror attack in Gush Etzion, and was honored with a moment of silence prior to the Monday Night Football game against the Buffalo Bills on November 23.

In 2017, just after the Patriots won Super Bowl LI, Kraft agreed to donate $6 million to build Israel's first ever regulation size football field, near Jerusalem. In June 2017, Robert Kraft along with several NFL Hall of Famers traveled to Israel for the grand opening of the new Kraft Family Sports Campus.

== See also ==
- Baseball in Israel
- Basketball in Israel
- Ice Hockey in Israel
- Rugby union in Israel
- List of Jews in American Football
- Soccer in Israel (Association football)
- Anglo-Israelis
