= 2007–2008 Israel Football League season =

Inaugural season of the Israel Football League

2007–2008 IFL season
- League: Israel Football League
- Sport: American football

Regular season
- Season MVP: Moshe Horowitz

Israel Bowl I
- Champions: Jerusalem Lions
- Runners-up: Haifa Underdogs
- Finals MVP: Moshe Horowitz

IFL seasons
- 2008–2009 →

The 2007–2008 Israel Football League season was the inaugural season of the Israel Football League. The season concluded with the Jerusalem Lions defeating the Haifa Underdogs, 24–18 in overtime, in Israel Bowl I.

== Regular season ==
The regular season began on November 17, 2007, and consisted of a nine-game schedule, with each team playing the others three times throughout the season. The top three teams at the end of the regular season qualified for the playoffs.

Pos	Team	Pld	W	L
1	Jerusalem Lions	9	8	1
2	Haifa Underdogs	9	6	3
3	Hasharon Pioneers	9	3	6
4	Tel Aviv Sabres	9	1	8

== Playoffs ==
The Underdogs defeated the Pioneers in the semifinals and faced the Lions in Israel Bowl I, which took place on March 28, 2008, at Kraft Family Stadium. Moshe Horowitz earned Israel Bowl MVP honors for the champion Jerusalem Lions, who won in overtime 24–18.

Semifinals			Israel Bowl I
			1	Jerusalem Lions	24*
2	Haifa Underdogs	38	2	Haifa Underdogs	18
3	Hasharon Pioneers	14

* Indicates overtime victory

== Awards ==
- Most Valuable Player: Moshe Horowitz, RB, Jerusalem Lions
- Most Improved Player: Erez "Shrek" Kaminski, OL, Haifa Underdogs
