= 2011–2012 Israel Football League season =

Fifth season of the Israel Football League

2011–2012 IFL season
- League: Israel Football League
- Sport: American football

Israel Bowl V
- Champions: Tel Aviv Sabres
- Runners-up: Tel Aviv Pioneers

IFL seasons
- ← 2010–2011 2012–2013 →

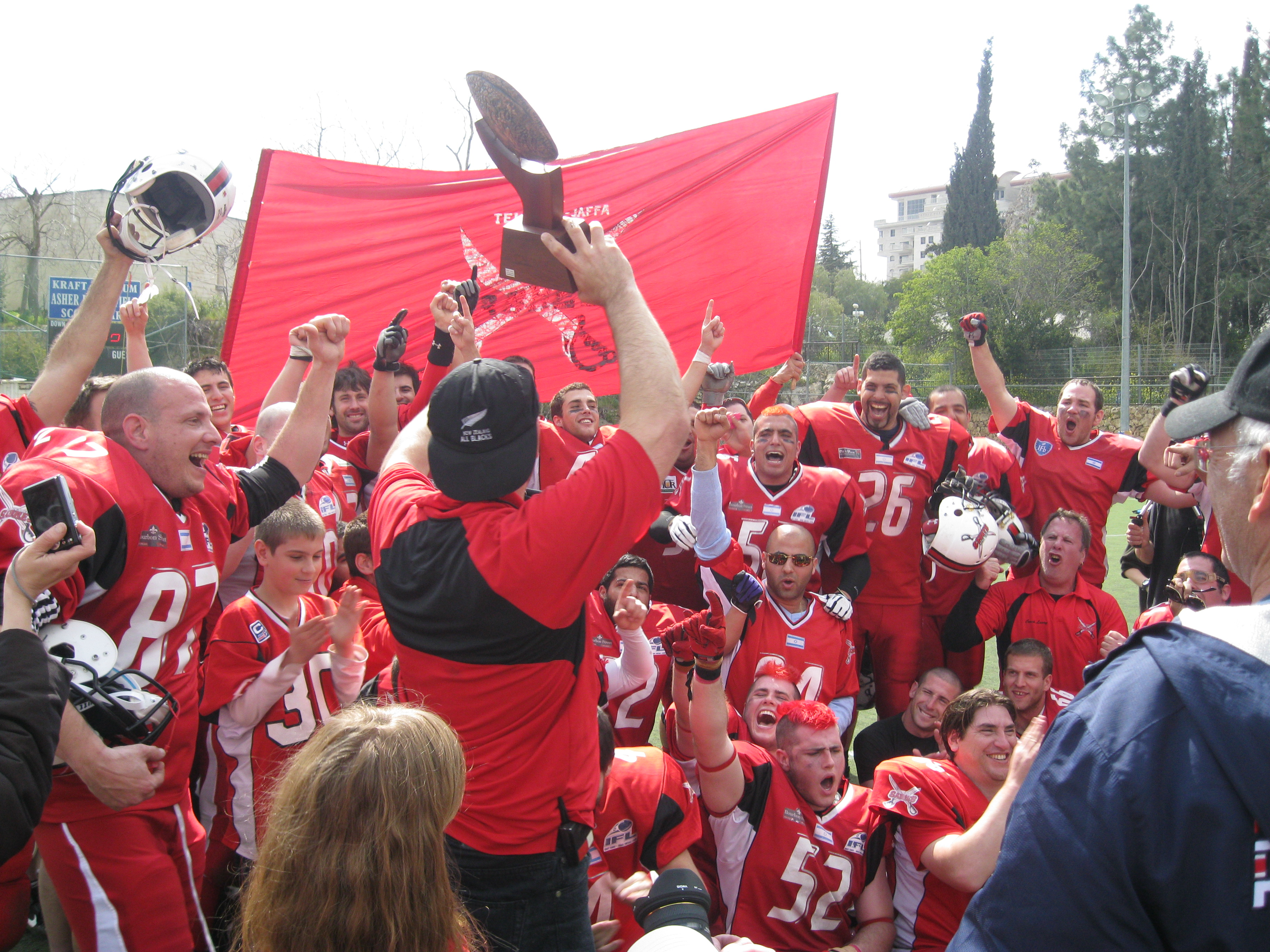
Tel Aviv - Jaffa Sabres celebrates Israel Bowl V winning

The 2011–2012 Israel Football League was the fifth season of the Israel Football League (IFL). The league expanded to ten teams with two expansion teams; the Petah-Tikva Troopers and the Nahariya Northern Stars. The season concluded with the Tel Aviv Sabres defeating the Tel Aviv Pioneers in Israel Bowl V.

== Regular season ==
The regular season consisted of 10 games for each team.

North
Pos	City	Team	Pld	W	L	PF	PA	PD
1	Tel Aviv	Sabres	10	9	1	436	164	+272
2	Tel Aviv	Pioneers	10	7	3	382	180	+202
3	Haifa	Underdogs	10	6	4	355	162	+193
4	Herzliya	Hammers	10	3	7	217	360	−143
5	Nahariya	Northern Stars	10	1	9	126	606	−480

South
Pos	City	Team	Pld	W	L	PF	PA	PD
1	Jerusalem	Lions	10	10	0	544	211	+333
2	Efrat	Rebels	10	7	3	398	214	+184
3	Jerusalem	Kings	10	4	6	299	377	−78
4	Be'er Sheva	Black Swarm	10	3	7	222	391	−169
5	Petah-Tikva	Troopers	10	0	10	148	574	−426

== Playoffs ==
=== Wild Card games ===
- Pioneers 34 – 6 Kings
- Rebels 47 – 91 Underdogs

=== Division Championships ===
- Lions 22 – 66 Pioneers
- Sabres 34 – 12 Underdogs

== Israel Bowl V ==
Sabres 44 - 42 Pioneers

== Awards ==
- Most Valuable Player: Chaim Schiff, QB, Jerusalem Lions
- Offensive Player-of-the-Year: Adi Hakami, QB, Tel Aviv/Jaffa Sabres
- Defensive Player-of-the-Year: Adam Zinker, DE/OLB, Tel Aviv/Jaffa Sabres
- Special Teams Player-of-the-Year:: Liran Zamir, K/P, Judean Rebels
- Coach-of-the-Year: Ori Shterenbach, Haifa Underdogs
- Rookie-of-the-Year: Chris Clark, RB/DB, Haifa Underdogs
- Newcomer-of-the-Year: Barak Katzir, DB/KR, Haifa Underdogs
