= 2016–2017 Israel Football League season =

Tenth season of the Israel Football League

2016–2017 IFL season
- League: Israel Football League
- Sport: American football

Israel Bowl X
- Champions: Jerusalem Lions
- Runners-up: Tel Aviv Pioneers

IFL seasons
- ← 2015–2016 2017–2018 →

The 2016–2017 Israel Football League season was the tenth season of the Israel Football League (IFL). The fields were enlarged to 80 yards and the games were now played with nine player teams. The season concluded with the Jerusalem Lions defeating the Tel Aviv Pioneers in Israel Bowl X.

== Regular season ==
The regular season consisted of 10 games for each team, with two games (home and away) against each team within their division and one game against each of the other teams.

Pos	Team	Pld	W	D	L	PF	PA	PD
1	Petah Tikva Troopers	10	9	0	1	455	116	+339
2	Tel Aviv Pioneers	10	8	0	2	368	257	+111
3	Ramat HaSharon Hammers	10	5	0	5	249	270	−21
4	Haifa Underdogs	10	2	1	7	152	313	−161

Pos	Team	Pld	W	D	L	PF	PA	PD
1	Jerusalem Lions	10	9	0	1	364	156	+208
2	Judean Rebels	10	6	0	4	290	257	+33
3	Be'er Sheva Black Swarm	10	2	1	7	104	287	−183
4	Mazkeret Batya Silverbacks	10	0	0	10	66	392	−326

== Playoffs ==
=== Wild Card games ===
- Rebels 36 – 14 Hammers
- Pioneers 68 – 40 Black Swarm

=== Division Championships ===
- Lions 48 – 40 Rebels
- Troopers 32 – 44 Pioneers

== Israel Bowl X ==
Lions 44 – 36 Pioneers
The Lions made a last minute comeback and then won in overtime.
