= 2008–2009 Israel Football League season =

Second season of the Israel Football League

2008–2009 IFL season
- League: Israel Football League
- Sport: American football

Regular season
- Season MVP: Asaf Katz

Israel Bowl II
- Champions: Modi'in Pioneers
- Runners-up: Jerusalem Lions
- Finals MVP: Asaf Katz

IFL seasons
- ← 2007–2008 2009–2010 →

The 2008–2009 Israel Football League season was the second season of the Israel Football League (IFL). This was the first season under the IFL's new sponsorship agreement with the Kraft Family, which re-branded itself as the Kraft Family Israel Football League. This was also the inaugural season for both the Jerusalem Kings expansion team and the Pioneers' in their new home of Modi'in after relocating from HaSharon in the off-season. The season concluded with the Modi'in Pioneers defeating the Jerusalem Lions, 32-26 in double overtime, in Israel Bowl II.

== Regular season ==
The regular season began in November 2008 and consisted of an eight game schedule, with each team playing the others twice during the season. The top four teams at the end of the regular season (Pioneers, Underdogs, Lions and Kings) qualified for the playoffs, with the Kings edging out the Sabres through the IFL points tie-breaker system.

Pos	Team	Pld	W	L
1	Modi'in Pioneers	8	7	1
2	Haifa Underdogs	8	6	2
3	Jerusalem Lions	8	5	3
4	Jerusalem Kings	8	1	7
5	Tel Aviv Sabres	8	1	7

== Playoffs ==
The semifinals saw the Pioneers defeat the Kings and the Lions upset the Underdogs to set up a match-up between the Pioneers and Lions in Israel Bowl II, which took place on April 3, 2009, at Kraft Family Stadium. Asaf Katz earned Israel Bowl MVP honors for the champion Modi'in Pioneers, who won in double overtime 32-26.

Semifinals
1	Modiin Pioneers	38
4	Jerusalem Kings	22
2	Haifa Underdogs	22
3	Jerusalem Lions	24

Israel Bowl II
1	Modi'in Pioneers	32*
3	Jerusalem Lions	26

* Indicates overtime victory

== Awards ==
- Most Valuable Player: Asaf Katz, LB, Modi'in Pioneers
