= Israel Football League =

American football league in Israel

- Current season, competition or edition: 2025 Israel Football League season
- Sport: American football
- Founded: 2005
- First season: 2007–2008
- Commissioner: Nimrod Pintel
- No. of teams: 8
- Country: Israel
- Most recent champions: Ramat Hasharon Hammers (2nd title)
- Most titles: Jerusalem Lions (4 titles)
- Sponsor: Kraft Family
- Website: israel-football.co.il/ifl

The Israel Football League (IFL; Hebrew: ליגת הפוטבול הישראלית), also known as the Kraft Family Israel Football League for sponsorship reasons with the Kraft Family, is an amateur gridiron football league consisting of eight teams. The IFL is the highest level of American football in Israel and each season culminates in the Israel Bowl. The Ramat HaSharon Hammers are the reigning Israel Bowl champions, having defeated the Jerusalem Lions in Israel Bowl XVIII, marking the Hammers’ 2nd Israbowl win in franchise history.

== History ==
=== Background ===
The original incarnation of the IFL consisted of pick-up games without helmets, pads or referees and was founded in 1999 by a group of football enthusiasts, including Ofri Becker, Gadi Gadot, Ben Friedman, Jonathan Yifat, Raviv Faig, Itay Ashkenazi, Yoram Leshem and Ori Shterenbach. This initiative led to the formation of a tackle football league that was first played in 2005-2006 and included three teams, the Tel Aviv Pioneers, Haifa Underdogs and Tel Aviv-Jaffa Sabres with Haifa winning the first championship and the Ofri Becker trophy. American football was present in Israel dating back to 1988, when American expat Steve Leibowitz founded a touch football league. In the summer of 2006, after one season, the Israeli group and Leibowitz agreed to merge their leagues and founded the current incarnation of the IFL. However, it wasn't until 2007 that the first official season took place with coaches, referees and full equipment under the governing body of American Football in Israel (AFI) and under the guidance of Eric Amkraut, the first Commissioner of the IFL. The inaugural season consisted of four teams with the addition of the Jerusalem Lions, and concluded with the latter winning Israel Bowl I.

In 2008, New England Patriots owner Robert Kraft and his family began to sponsor the IFL and donated Kraft Family Stadium in Jerusalem to the league.

Until 2017, there were no American football fields in Israel and, other than Kraft Family Stadium, which was only 80-yards long and narrower than an American football college field, the teams had to reserve soccer fields which weren't always available. That changed when the Kraft Family Sports Campus opened in Jerusalem in June 2017, thanks to the generosity of philanthropist and New England Patriots owner Robert Kraft and the Kraft Family. The Kraft Family Sports Campus includes multiple sports fields, including Israel's first regulation-size American football field which now serves as the site for the Israel Bowl, as well as homefield for the Israeli National Team and the Jerusalem Lions.

=== 2007–2008 season ===
The inaugural season of the IFL, with regulation pads and staff, consisted of four teams: the Jerusalem Lions, the Haifa Underdogs, the HaSharon Pioneers, and the Tel Aviv-Jaffa Sabres. In the championship game, Israel Bowl I, the Jerusalem Lions defeated the Haifa Underdogs in overtime.

MVP: Moshe Horowitz, Jerusalem Lions

MIP: Erez Kaminski, Haifa Underdogs

=== 2008–2009 season ===
The IFL grew to five teams with the addition of another team in Jerusalem (Jerusalem Kings), while the Pioneers moved to Modi'in. The Pioneers defeated the defending champion Lions, 32–26, in double overtime in Israel Bowl II.

MVP: Asaf Katz, Modi'in Pioneers

=== 2009–2010 season ===
The IFL expanded to seven teams with the addition of two expansion teams: the Be'er Sheva Black Swarm and the Judean Rebels. The schedule grew as well, as each team played ten regular season games with the top six teams qualifying for the playoffs. The Tel Aviv-Jaffa Sabres defeated the Jerusalem Lions 26–22 in Israel Bowl III, which was the first ever live televised football game in Israel.

MVP: Jon Rubin, Jerusalem Kings

=== 2010–2011 season ===
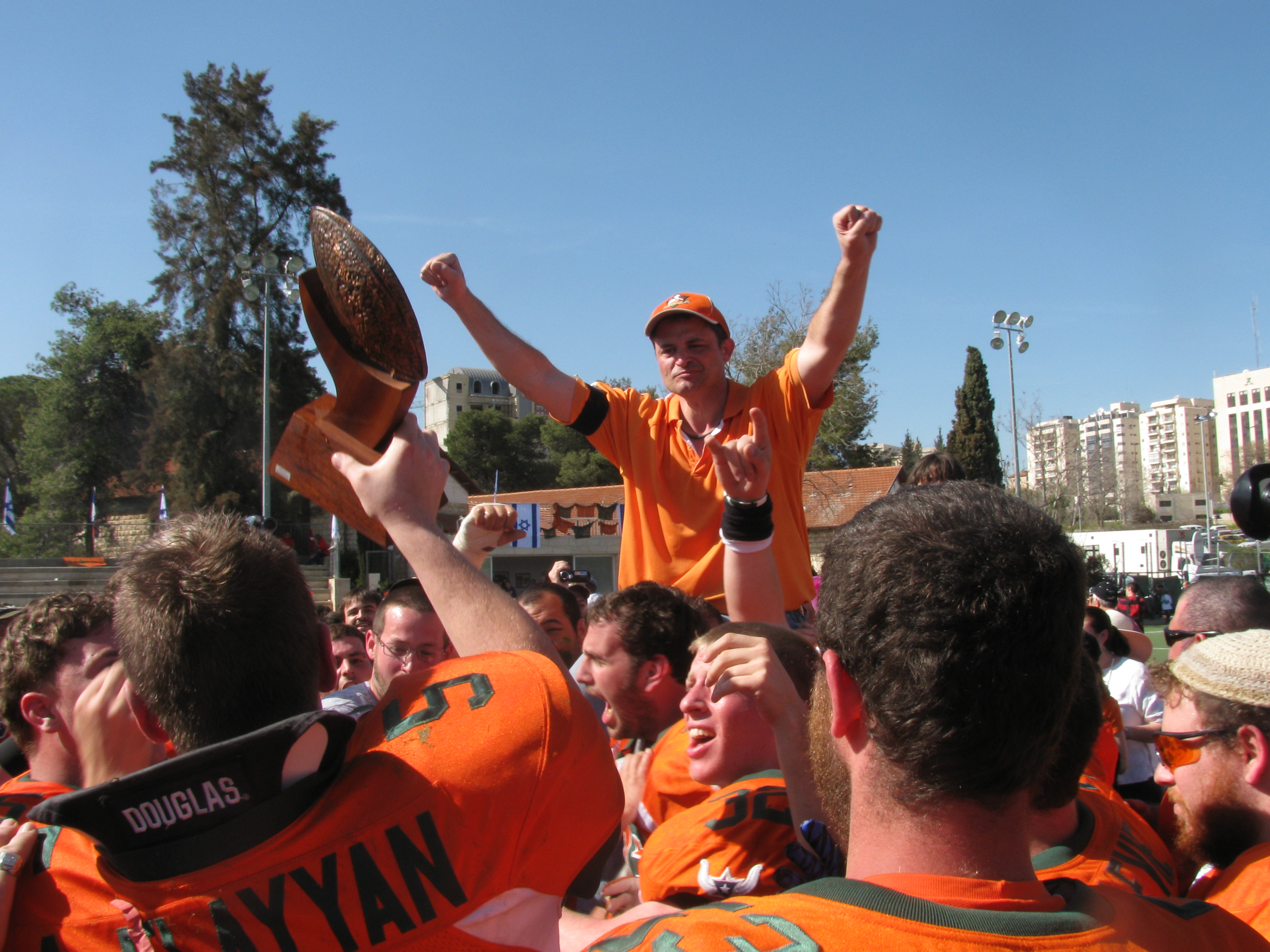
Judean Rebels with the Becker Trophy, celebrating their victory in IsraBowl IV

The IFL expanded to eight teams with the expansion Herzliya Hammers joining the league. The Pioneers relocated to Tel Aviv. The league split into two divisions; the North Division with the Tel Aviv-Jaffa Sabres, Tel Aviv Pioneers, Haifa Underdogs and Herzliya Hammers; and the South Division, with the Jerusalem Lions, Jerusalem Kings, Judean Rebels and the Be'er Sheva Black Swarm.

The Sabres won the North Division and clinched a first round bye in the playoffs and then defeated the Pioneers in the semifinals, who had defeated the Hammers in the first round. In the South Division, the Lions earned the first round bye. The Rebels defeated the Black Swarm in the first round and then upset the Lions in the semifinals by overcoming an 18-point deficit with 7:40 left in the game. The Rebels then held off a comeback attempt and defeated the Sabres in Israel Bowl IV, 32–30.

MVP: Alex Swieca, Judean Rebels

=== 2011–2012 season ===
The IFL expanded to ten teams with the expansion Petah Tikva Troopers joining the South Division and the Northern Stars joining the North Division. In the playoffs, the 5th-seeded Haifa Underdogs routed the defending champion Judean Rebels in the first round but were defeated by the Tel Aviv-Jaffa Sabres in the semifinals. The Tel Aviv Pioneers defeated the Jerusalem Kings in the first round, and then routed the previously undefeated Jerusalem Lions behind a record-setting performance by running back Ilan Bielas.

Israel Bowl V featured both Tel Aviv teams. The Sabres took a 14–0 lead in the first quarter, but had no answer to Pioneers RB Ilan Bielas, who lead his team to a 28–22 lead in the second quarter. The teams were tied at halftime and the third quarter was a scoreless affair, which set the table for a back-and-forth fourth quarter. After exchanging multiple scores, the Pioneers were driving with one minute to go and the Sabres up by two. A miscommunication between QB Itay Ashkenazi and RB Koby Nimrod lead to a Pioneer fumble, which the Sabres recovered to clinch their second Israel Bowl title.

MVP: Chaim Schiff, Jerusalem Lions

=== 2012–2013 season ===
The IFL expanded to eleven teams with the expansion Rehovot Silverbacks joining the league. The division format was replaced with a simpler schedule where each team played the other once. The first round saw two upsets, including the Kings' Hail Mary pass to defeat the Hammers. In the semifinals, the Sabres routed the Kings and the Rebels upset the Pioneers in over 100°F heat. The Sabres defeated the Rebels in Israel Bowl VI to secure their second straight Israel Bowl title and became the first team in IFL history to go undefeated through the regular season and postseason.

MVP: Dani Eastman, Judean Rebels

=== 2013–2014 season ===
Betzalel Friedman took over as commissioner of the IFL and the league expanded to play nine-on-nine instead of eight-on-eight. The IFL also implemented a foreign-player limit for the first time and the Hammers relocated to Ramat HaSharon. During a regular season game between the Tel Aviv-Jaffa Sabres and Judean Rebels, the Sabres walked off the field in protest of the refereeing. The team was handed a postseason ban and subsequently folded.

The Rebels and Hammers earned the top two seeds for the playoffs, but both were upset in the semifinals; the Rebels lost to a strong Pioneer defense and the Hammers lost an overtime thriller to the Lions. Israel Bowl VII was the most lopsided IsraBowl ever, as the Pioneers routed the Lions, 80–28.

MVP: Dani Eastman, Judean Rebels

=== 2014–2015 season ===
The Silverbacks relocated five kilometers southeast to Mazkeret Batya. The Judean Rebels finished the regular season undefeated for the second consecutive season, behind the highest scoring offense and the second-best defense (in PPG) in IFL history. This time they were able to win the championship, defeating the Tel Aviv Pioneers, 20–10, in Israel Bowl VIII.

MVP: Dani Eastman, Judean Rebels

=== 2015–2016 season ===
The season consisted of a ten-game schedule and the league went to 80-yard fields. The Judean Rebels defeated the Tel Aviv Pioneers, 32–14, in Israel Bowl IX.

MVP: David Abell, Jerusalem Lions

=== 2016–2017 season ===
The tenth season of the IFL consisted of a ten-game schedule. The season concluded with the Jerusalem Lions erasing a ten-point deficit with 4 minutes left in the game, to defeat the Tel Aviv Pioneers in Israel Bowl X, as league and game MVP, David Abell, threw a walk-off touchdown in overtime to Ezzy Jaski.

For the Lions, it was their second championship and their first since Israel Bowl I. Between the two titles, they appeared in three Israel Bowls, losing in Israel Bowl II, Israel Bowl III, and Israel Bowl VII.

MVP: David Abell, Jerusalem Lions

=== 2017–2018 season ===
Only seven teams competed this season, with the Ramat HaSharon Hammers going on hiatus. The season concluded with the Jerusalem Lions defeating the Petah Tikva Troopers, 28–20, in IsraBowl XI to win their second consecutive championship. David Abell was named Israel Bowl MVP for the second year in a row.

MVP: David Abell, Jerusalem Lions

=== 2018–2019 season ===
The season began on November 15, 2018, and was the first to feature eleven-man football and regulation-width fields. The Ramat HaSharon Hammers also returned to play after being on hiatus for a year. The Jerusalem Lions defeated the Petah Tikva Troopers, 29–26, in Israel Bowl XII to capture their third consecutive championship.

MVP: David Fitoussi, Jerusalem Lions

=== 2019–2020 season ===
The season began on November 28, 2019, and was scheduled to conclude on March 19, 2020, with IsraBowl XIII. However, after the regular season concluded the remaining games were postponed until further notice due to the COVID-19 pandemic and later cancelled.

MVP: Ronnie Hayes, Beersheva Black Swarm

=== 2021 season ===
The season began on April 29, 2021, and concluded on July 15, 2021, with Israbowl XIV. The Tel Aviv Pioneers defeated the Jerusalem Lions 13–8.

=== 2022 season ===
The season began on February 3, 2022. The season only featured 7 teams due to the Be'er Sheva Black Swarm taking a hiatus. The Ramat HaSharon Hammers finished the regular season with a perfect 10–0 record. They defeated the Bet Shemesh Rebels 44–40 in the semifinals, and went on to win Israbowl XV on June 23, 2022, by defeating the Tel Aviv Pioneers 18–14. The victory was sealed with a last-minute goal line stand by the Hammers at their own 6 yard line. Dani Eastman would go on to win his third MVP award, and him, his brother David, and his father, Coach Avi Eastman, would win their third Israbowl championship together.

MVP: Dani Eastman, Ramat HaSharon Hammers

=== 2023 Season ===
The season concluded on May 18, 2023, with Israbowl XVI. The Tel Aviv Pioneers defeated the Ramat HaSharon Hammers 42–36.

== Teams ==
Israel Football League teams

=== Current Teams ===
Team	Founded
Haifa Underdogs	2005
Jerusalem Lions	2007
Tel Aviv Pioneers	2005
Be'er Sheva Spartans	2009
Beit Shemesh Rebels	2009
Ramat HaSharon Hammers	2010
Petah Tikva Troopers	2011
Mazkeret Batya Silverbacks	2012

=== Defunct Teams ===
Team	Years active
Tel Aviv-Jaffa Sabres	2005–2013
Jerusalem Kings	2008–2015
Northern Stars	2011–2015

== Israel Bowl ==
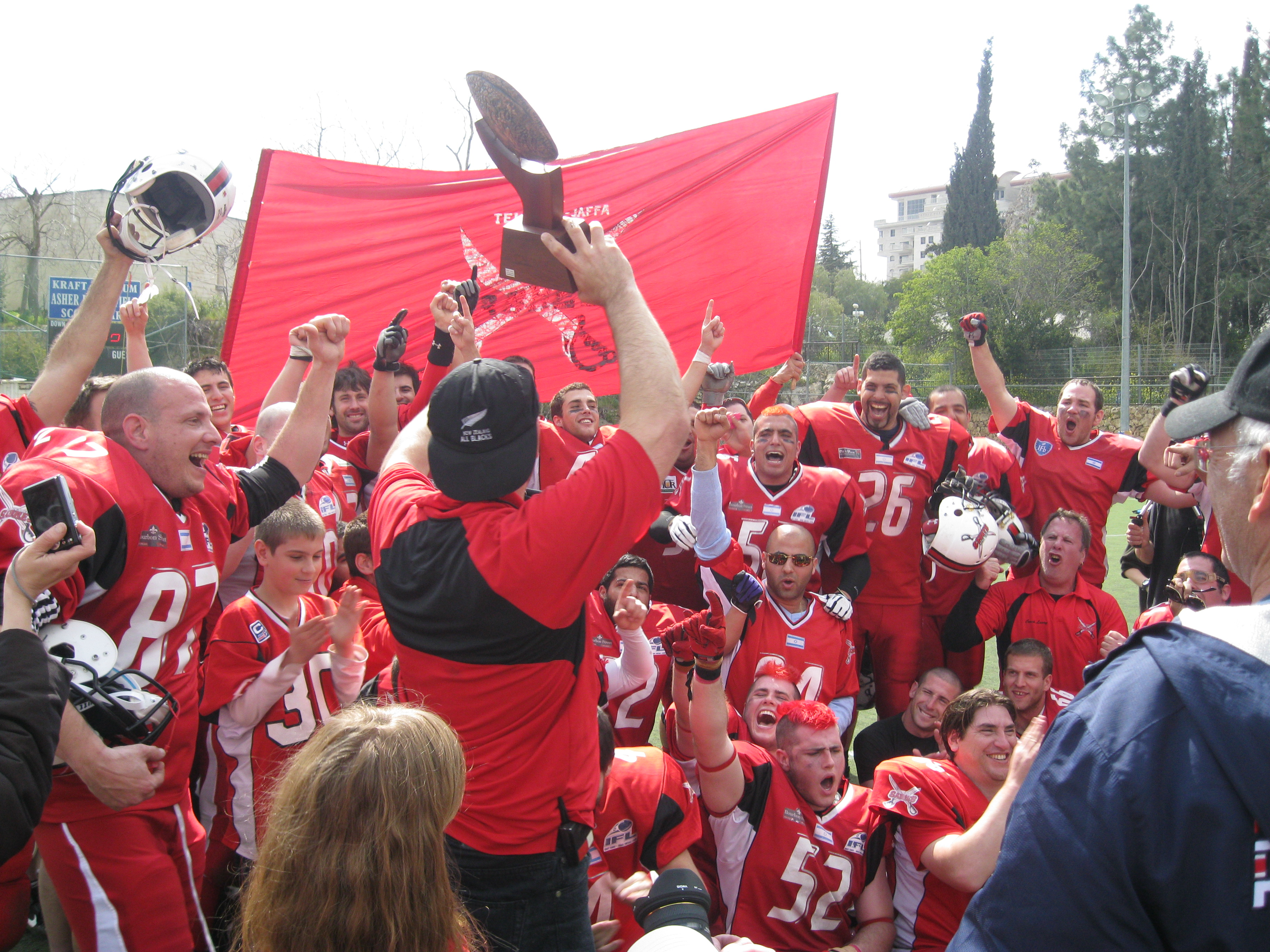
The Tel Aviv-Jaffa Sabres celebrate their Israel Bowl V victory. QB Adi Hakami holds the Becker Trophy.

The Israel Bowl, sometimes referred to as the IsraBowl, is the Kraft Family IFL championship game. The Jerusalem Lions have won a record four Israel Bowl championships with a record seven Israel Bowl appearances. The first six champion teams were awarded the Becker Trophy.

=== Results ===
Game	Season	Champion	Runner up	Venue	Date	MVP
Israel Bowl I	2007–2008	Jerusalem Lions	Haifa Underdogs	Kraft Stadium, Jerusalem	March 28, 2008	Moshe Horowitz (Lions)
Israel Bowl II	2008–2009	Modi'in Pioneers	Jerusalem Lions	Kraft Stadium, Jerusalem	April 3, 2009	Assaf Katz (Pioneers)
Israel Bowl III	2009–2010	Tel Aviv Sabres	Jerusalem Lions	Kraft Stadium, Jerusalem	March 26, 2010	Evan Reshef (Sabres)
Israel Bowl IV	2010–2011	Judean Rebels	Tel Aviv Sabres	Kraft Stadium, Jerusalem	March 18, 2011	Zack Miller (Rebels)
Israel Bowl V	2011–2012	Tel Aviv Sabres	Tel Aviv Pioneers	Kraft Stadium, Jerusalem	March 30, 2012	Adi Hakami and Jonathan Curran (Sabres)
Israel Bowl VI	2012–2013	Tel Aviv Sabres	Judean Rebels	Kraft Stadium, Jerusalem	March 22, 2013	Jonathan Curran and Banning Fudge (Sabres)
Israel Bowl VII	2013–2014	Tel Aviv Pioneers	Jerusalem Lions	Kraft Stadium, Jerusalem	April 11, 2014	Ronny Moscona (Pioneers)
Israel Bowl VIII	2014–2015	Judean Rebels	Tel Aviv Pioneers	Kraft Stadium, Jerusalem	March 26, 2015	Dani Eastman (Rebels)
Israel Bowl IX	2015–2016	Judean Rebels	Tel Aviv Pioneers	Moshava Stadium Practice Facility, Petah Tikva	April 14, 2016	Dani Eastman (Rebels)
Israel Bowl X	2016–2017	Jerusalem Lions	Tel Aviv Pioneers	Moshava Stadium Practice Facility, Petah Tikva	March 30, 2017	David Abell (Lions)
Israel Bowl XI	2017–2018	Jerusalem Lions	Petah Tikva Troopers	Kraft Family Sports Campus, Jerusalem	March 22, 2018	David Abell (Lions)
Israel Bowl XII	2018–2019	Jerusalem Lions	Petah Tikva Troopers	Kraft Family Sports Campus, Jerusalem	March 1, 2019	Effi Mishaan (Lions)
Israel Bowl XIII	2019–20	Cancelled				
Israel Bowl XIV	2021	Tel Aviv Pioneers	Jerusalem Lions	Kraft Family Sports Campus, Jerusalem	July 15, 2021	Daniel Jackson (Pioneers)
Israel Bowl XV	2022	Ramat HaSharon Hammers	Tel Aviv Pioneers	Kraft Family Sports Campus, Jerusalem	June 23, 2022	Dani Eastman (Hammers)
Israel Bowl XVI	2023	Tel Aviv Pioneers	Ramat HaSharon Hammers	Kraft Family Sports Campus, Jerusalem	May 18, 2023	
Israel Bowl XVIII	2025	Ramat HaSharon Hammers	Jerusalem Lions	Kraft Family Sports Campus, Jerusalem	February 23, 2025	Dani Eastman (Hammers)

== See also ==
- American football in Israel
- Israel national American football team
- Anglo-Israelis
