= Mesika =

Mesika is a Jewish-Tunisian surname and may refer to:

- Erez Mesika, Israeli footballer
- Gal Mesika, Israeli American footballer
- Gershon Mesika, Israeli lawyer and politician
- Miri Mesika, Israeli singer
- Reef Mesika, Israeli footballer
- Yigal Mesika, Israeli magician
