= Nine-man football =

American football variant

Nine-man football is a type of American football played by high schools that are too small to field teams for the usual 11-man game. In the United States, the Minnesota State High School League, North Dakota High School Activities Association, South Dakota High School Activities Association, and Wyoming High School Activities Association hold high-school state tournaments in nine-man football. It is the earliest attested reduced-man variant of football, being attested as early as 1889 in an Amateur Athletic Union-sanctioned college football game at the original outdoor Madison Square Garden.

== Overview ==
The size of the playing field is often smaller in nine-man football than in 11-man. Some states opt for a smaller, 80-yard-long by 40-yard-wide field (which is also used in eight-man and six-man); other states keep the field of play at the standard 100 yards long while reducing the width to 40 yards, some even play on a full-sized playing field (with the 53 1/3 yard-wide field). In games played on 80-yard fields, kickoffs take place from the 20-yard line rather than from the 40-yard line.

Though there isn't a robust, established semi-pro network of nine-man football leagues in the United States, the North Louisiana Football Alliance specifically plays nine-man football and is one of the few examples of a semi-pro league that utilizes this format.

Some leagues, like the Mid-West United Football League, have used nine-man football as a way of furthering their "Passion to Play". They play 8-game seasons and keep full statistics.

A similar nine-man modification of Canadian football is played on the Canadian standard 110-yard field by small schools in the provinces of Saskatchewan and Alberta and for small community associations in British Columbia. It is the standard format of play for eight- and nine-year-olds. The format is similar for five-, six-, and seven-year-old flag football, where the field is reduced to 50 yards by 50 yards.

== Rules ==
The rules require that the offense align four players in the backfield and five on the line of scrimmage. A standard I formation has a quarterback, a fullback, a tailback, and five linemen. Usually, the outside linemen are a tight end and a wide receiver, but the alignment varies by formation. The fourth player in the offensive backfield often plays as an additional wide receiver or tight end.

A common defensive formation is the 3–3–3, with three defensive linemen, three linebackers, and two defensive backs with one safety. Other defensive schemes include 3–2–4, 4–2–3, and 4–4–1. These formations aim to balance run and pass defense with varying numbers of linemen, linebackers, and defensive backs.

== Game play ==
The games are frequently high-scoring because the number of players is reduced by more than the size of the field; thus, fast players usually find more open space to run within the field of play.

== Other countries ==
In France, most competitions are played nine-man: games and leagues involving 19-year-old players or younger, division 3 (Le Casque d'Argent), and regional leagues. Blocking under the belt is strictly forbidden under nine-man French rules, but the field size remains the same as in standard 11-man American football.

The junior division (under 18s) of every state in Australia also play nine-man football. The game is played on a full-sized field, with modified timing rules (10-min quarters, running clock except the last 2 min of each half).

In Norway, division 1 games are traditional 11-man games, while division 2 games are nine-man football.

Italy, Poland and Argentina also have nine-man leagues.

In Germany, some lower youth classes play in nine-man leagues.

In Israel, the Israel Football League is a nine-man league.

In Russia, the Second League play in nine-man leagues.

== See also ==
- Six-man football
- Eight-man football
