= Marques Anderson =

American football player (born 1979)

No. 20, 23, 25
- Position: Safety

Personal information
- Born: May 26, 1979 (age 47); Harbor City, California, U.S.
- Listed height: 6 ft 1 in (1.85 m)
- Listed weight: 210 lb (95 kg)

Career information
- High school: Long Beach Polytechnic (Long Beach, California)
- College: UCLA
- NFL draft: 2002: 3rd round, 92nd overall pick

Career history
- Green Bay Packers (2002–2003); Oakland Raiders (2004); Denver Broncos (2005); San Francisco 49ers (2005)

Awards and highlights
- Second-team All-Pac-10 (2001)

Career NFL statistics
- Total tackles: 213
- Forced fumbles: 1
- Fumble recoveries: 6
- Pass deflections: 17
- Interceptions: 6
- Defensive touchdowns: 2
- Stats at Pro Football Reference

Marques Deon Anderson (born May 26, 1979) is an American former professional football player who was a safety in the National Football League (NFL). He was selected by the Green Bay Packers in the third round of the 2002 NFL draft. Anderson also played for the Oakland Raiders, Denver Broncos, and San Francisco 49ers. He graduated from UCLA with a Bachelor of Arts in American Literature and Culture. In 2012, Marques earned his Master of Arts and Social Sciences with a major in Adult Learning and Global Change from Linköpings University in Sweden.

Anderson is the founder and director of the World Education Foundation, currently engaging in international research and development projects.

During his final year, Marques met his mentor and decided to leave his NFL career to focus on international socially responsible business.

In 2011 and 2012 Marques took on the position of Athletic Director and Head Coach for the Norwegian American Football organization Oslo Vikings. The Vikings went on to win league and national championships in both years. In 2012, the Oslo Vikings won league or national titles at every level in the Norwegian series from U-14 to Seniors.
