= Ryan Bethea =

American-football player (born 1967)

No. 84
- Position: Wide receiver

Personal information
- Born: March 26, 1967 (age 59); Dillon, South Carolina, U.S.
- Listed height: 6 ft 4 in (1.93 m)
- Listed weight: 205 lb (93 kg)

Career information
- High school: Richland Northeast (Columbia, South Carolina)
- College: South Carolina (1985–1987)
- Supplemental draft: 1988: 5th round

Career history

Playing
- Minnesota Vikings (1988); Charlotte Rage (1992–1993)

Coaching
- Bergen Storm (2009–2010)

Awards and highlights
- AFL All-Star (1993)

Career AFL statistics
- Receptions: 118
- Receiving yards: 1,330
- Receiving touchdowns: 24
- Stats at ArenaFan.com

Ryan Leymone Bethea (born March 26, 1967) is an American former football wide receiver. He played college football at the University of South Carolina and was selected by the Minnesota Vikings in the fifth round of the 1988 NFL supplemental draft. He later played two seasons with the Charlotte Rage of the Arena Football League (AFL).

== Early life and college ==
Ryan Leymone Bethea was born on March 26, 1967, in Dillon, South Carolina. He attended Richland Northeast High School in Columbia, South Carolina.

Bethea was a three-year letterman for the South Carolina Gamecocks from 1985 to 1987. In 1988, he was suspended indefinitely from the Gamecocks over drug-related charges. He also lost his amateur status after letting an agent pay for a trip.

== Professional career ==
Bethea was selected by the Minnesota Vikings in the fifth round of the 1988 NFL supplemental draft. He signed with the Vikings on October 17, 1988. On October 20, the Star Tribune reported that the Vikings had two weeks to either activate Bethea or release him or they would lose his rights. He was promoted to the active roster in early November 1988. However, he did not play in any games for the Vikings and was placed on injured reserve in November with a pulled hamstring.

Bethea played for the Charlotte Rage from 1992 to 1993, recording 118 receptions and 24 touchdowns on 1,330 receiving yards. He earned AFL All-Star honors in 1993.

== Coaching career ==
Bethea was head coach of the Bergen Storm from 2009 to 2010.
