= Nidaros Domers =

American football team in Trondheim, Norway

The NTNUI Nidaros Domers are an American football team based in Trondheim, Norway. They are currently members of the Norwegian Federation of American Sports (NAIF). Originally called the Trondheim Tomcats, the team was founded in 1992, competing in NoAFF Division II until winning the division championship in 1998. The team changed its name to the Nidaros Domers, and in the late 1990s, joined the NTNUI, adding its initials to its moniker.

After going winless in their inaugural Division I season of 1999, In 2002, Canadian Quarterback Kenrick Williams & Canadian running back Rodger Allain signed contracts to play football with the Nidaros Domers of the Norway American Football Federation. The team earned their first Division I Western Conference title.
