= Oslo Vikings =

American football club in Oslo, Norway

- Founded: 1986
- League: Superserien
- Team history: Westside Vikings (1986-1992) Oslo Vikings (1992-present)
- Based in: Oslo, Norway
- Stadium: Frogner stadion
- Colors: Red and White
- Head coach: Adam Lukasiewicz
- Championships: Eliteserien: 1990, 1991, 1992, 1998, 1999, 2000, 2002, 2011, 2012, 2016, 2017, 2018, 2019, 2023, 2026
- Website: oslovikings.com

Oslo Vikings is an American football club located in Oslo, Norway, that competes in the Swedish Superserien. They formerly competed in the Norwegian Eliteserien of the Norges Amerikanske Idretters Forbund, and the European Federation of American Football tournaments.

The club was founded in 1986 and prior to 1992, the team was known as the Westside Vikings. In 2010, the club moved to its current home ground Frogner Stadion.

The Vikings have won 8 total national championship titles (trailing only the Vålerenga Trolls, who have 10). The Vikings had the most players (9) on the NoAFF 15th Anniversary All-Star Team (named in 2002). The team also has fierce rivalries with the Vålerenga Trolls, which is the longest rivalry in the NoAFF and in recent years the Eidsvoll 1814s.
The Vikings' top international achievement is their 12–6 2000 EFAF EuroCup Championship Game appearance against the London O's in Brussels, a game the Vikings lost 12–6.

== History ==
The Vikings were founded in Oslo in September 1986 by a group of friends who had previously played for the Ris, Ullern and Oslo Commerce School high school teams. The founding name of the club was the Westside Vikings, and they immediately entered competition in the then new, three-team Norwegian American Football Federation league, joining the Vålerenga Trolls and the Kolbotn Kodiaks.

Before the 2024 season, the Vikings left the Norwegian League and joined the Swedish Superserien.

== Results ==
In 1990, 1991 and 1992 the Vikings won three consecutive National Championships under coach Mark Troop. They lost the National Championship game to the Trolls in 1993, 1994, 1995, 1996 and 1997, before they reclaimed the National Championship in 1998, 1999, 2000 and 2002.
The Vikings senior team have made it to the championship game in all of its years of existence except in 2003 and 2004, when the team did not make the playoffs.

In 2008 they did not make it to the EFL quarter finals, after losing against Coventry Cassidy Jets.

In 2011 Oslo Vikings again reclaimed the National Championship under head coach Marques Anderson. In 2012, the Oslo Vikings won their 9th National Championship.

From 2016 to 2019 the Vikings won four consecutive National Championships.

The Vikings won back-to-back National Championships in 2022 and 2023 before moving to the Swedish Superserien.

=== Championships ===
==== League ====
- Eliteserien (Norwegian National Championship)
  - Winners (15): 1990, 1991, 1992, 1998, 1999, 2000, 2002, 2011, 2012, 2016, 2017, 2018, 2019, 2023, 2026
  - Runners-up: 1986, 1987, 1988, 1989, 1993, 1994, 1995, 1996, 1997, 2001, 2006, 2007, 2008, 2009, 2010, 2022

==== Cup ====
- EFAF EuroCup
  - Winners: 0
  - Runners-up: 1999

== Organization ==
The Oslo Vikings are members of the Norwegian National Federation of Sports and the European Federation of American Football through their membership in the Norwegian American Football and Cheerleading Federation. The Vikings are also members of the Oslo City Sports Association. The highest body of the club is the annual members meeting, which elects a board for a one-year term. The board, led by a president, is responsible for the day-to-day administration and football operations of the club, the budget as well as the long-term planning. The organizational work is based entirely on volunteer efforts.

Reporting to the board, is a senior department led by the club's head coach and a junior department led by the Junior manager. The junior department consists of separate U13 (10–13), U16 (14–16) and U19 (17–19) teams.
Associated with the Vikings, but with a separate board and organization, is the Viqueens Cheerleading and Cheerdance club.

== Notable players, coaches and club members ==
Vikings' Members of the NoAFF 20th anniversary All-Time Allstar Team:

- Erik Allum – DB
- Nicolay Aslaksen – RB
- Gaute Engebretsen – DB
- Henrik Dahl – TE/LB
- Pär Kärn – OG
- Sten Kagnes – OT
- Finn-Jarle Mathisen – LB/WR
- Ole Petter Nyhaug – OG/LB
- Christian Paulsboe – DL
- David Rødsand – WR
- Garry Fraser - LB-RB

Head coaches

- Henrik Dahl – 1989
- Mark Troop – 1990–1992
- Joe Løkhaug – 1993–1994
- Henrik Dahl – 1995
- Joe Murawa – 1996
- Val Gunn – 1997–1998
- Chris Gauvreau – 1999–2001
- Terry Kleinsmith – 2002
- Karl Lerum – 2003
- Blake Miller – 2004–2005
- Val Gunn – 2006–2008
- Brian Cain – 2009
- Chris Gauvreau – 2010
- Marques Anderson – 2011–2012
- Jesse Alderfer – 2012–2016
- Derek Mann – 2016–2024
- Sam Gooding – 2025
- Adam Lukasiewicz – 2026–present

Vikings' members inducted into the Vikings Hall of Fame for long-term and valuable service to the club:

- Henrik Dahl – Co-founder, early club president, coach, standout player
- Ole Petter Nyhaug – Club president for 9 consecutive years, player, federation president and organizer, U14 coach
- Gaute Engebretsen – Founding member, veteran player, coach, and club president for several years
- Vilhelm Lae – Founder of the junior program, coach, board member for over 10 years responsible for football operations, standout player
- Nicolay Aslaksen – Standout player, team captain and leader, board member for several years
