= Kristiansand Gladiators =

American football team in Kristiansand, Norway

- Founded: 1993
- League: Division I
- Based in: Kristiansand, Norway
- Stadium: Karuss Colosseum
- Colors: Black and Red
- Head coach: Dan Levy
- Championships: Eliteserien: 2014; Division I: 2010

Kristiansand Gladiators is the name of an American football team located in Kristiansand, Norway that competes in Division I of the Norwegian Federation of American Sports (NAIF). The team plays its home games at Karuss Colosseum in Vågsbygd, Kristiansand. They also have a reputation for having some of the loudest fans in the league.
