= Petah Tikva Troopers =

American football team in Israel

- Founded: 2011
- League: Israel Football League
- Location: Petah Tikva, Israel
- Stadium: HaMoshava Stadium
- Colors: Green and Yellow
- Head coach: Avi Eastman

The Petah Tikva Troopers are a semiprofessional American football team based in Petah Tikva, Israel. The Troopers compete in the Israel Football League.

== History ==
The Troopers began their inaugural season in 2011 and had limited success during their first five seasons. However, in 2017 they reached the semifinals after a 9–1 regular season and in 2018 they reached their first Israel Bowl, when they were defeated by the Jerusalem Lions, 28–20, in Israel Bowl XI.

| Season | W | L | Result |
|---|---|---|---|
| 2011–2012 | 0 | 10 | Missed playoffs |
| 2012–2013 | 2 | 8 | Missed playoffs |
| 2013–2014 | 5 | 4 | Lost Quarterfinals |
| 2014–2015 | 3 | 6 | Lost Quarterfinals |
| 2015–2016 | 1 | 9 | Missed playoffs |
| 2016–2017 | 9 | 1 | Lost Semifinals |
| 2017–2018 | 5 | 5 | Lost Israel Bowl XI |

== Sponsorship ==
The Troopers are sponsored by Mike's Place, a bar and restaurant chain in Israel.

== Stadium ==
The Troopers play their home games at HaMoshava Stadium in Petah Tikva.
