= Eight-man football =

Form of gridiron football

Eight-man football is a form of gridiron football, generally played by high schools with smaller enrollments or by semi-professional leagues with limited players. Eight-man football differs from the traditional 11-man game with the reduction of three players on each side of the ball and a field width that can be reduced to 40 yards, 13 1/3 yards narrower than the 53 1/3-yard 11-man field. Most states continue to play on a field 100 yards long, whereas a few states opt for 80-yard lengths. Reduced-player football, which consists of eight-man, six-man, and nine-man football has gained popularity across the United States. As of 2015, 1,561 schools in 30 states sponsor reduced-player football, with 1,161 of those teams participating in eight-man leagues, whereas 284 teams play six-man football and 116 teams play nine-man football.

== Overview ==
Eight-man football shares the same rules, procedures, and structure as the traditional 11-man game, with a few minor differences. Eight-man football is played with eight players on offense and defense, three fewer than the 11-man game. It depends greatly on the type of formation used, but the eliminated players are commonly two offensive tackles and a skill position player on offense and one defensive back, one linebacker and one defensive linemen on defense.

The size of the playing field is often smaller in eight-man football than in 11-man. To accommodate six fewer players on the field, the width of the field is 40-yard-wide (37 m), 13 1/3-yards narrower than the 53 1/3-yard eleven-man field. Most eight-man leagues mandate 100-yard length fields, where few choose the 80-yard-long (73 m) field length option.

There are several professional and semi-professional eight-man football leagues in the United States. The eight-man format was adopted by most indoor football leagues, including the Arena Football League and Indoor Football League; these leagues use a 50-yard (46 m) by roughly 25-yard (23 m) field. There are some non-high-school eight-man leagues that play outdoors; the semi-pro Eight Man Football League (8FL) in Illinois and Missouri played on a 60-yard (55 m) field.

== Eight-man teams by state ==
- Note: States with limited eight-man teams may be affiliated with out-of-state leagues.

| State | 8-man | 6-man | 9-man |
|---|---|---|---|
| Alabama | 23 | 8 | 0 |
| Alaska | 0 | 0 | 5 |
| Arizona | 31 | 0 | 0 |
| Arkansas | 21 | 0 | 0 |
| California | 108 | 0 | 0 |
| Colorado | 40 | 30 | 0 |
| Connecticut | 1 | 0 | 0 |
| Delaware | 15 | 0 | 0 |
| Florida | 15 | 32 | 0 |
| Georgia | 21 | 0 | 0 |
| Hawaii | 8 | 0 | 0 |
| Idaho | 45 | 2 | 0 |
| Illinois | 24 | 1 | 0 |
| Indiana | 5 | 0 | 0 |
| Iowa | 61 | 0 | 0 |
| Kansas | 90 | 28 | 0 |
| Kentucky | 1 | 0 | 0 |
| Louisiana | 9 | 0 | 0 |
| Maine | 10 | 0 | 0 |
| Maryland | 0 | 0 | 0 |
| Massachusetts | 0 | 0 | 0 |
| Michigan | 64 | 0 | 0 |
| Minnesota | 0 | 0 | 70 |
| Mississippi | 21 | 0 | 0 |
| Missouri | 39 | 0 | 0 |
| Montana | 41 | 37 | 0 |
| Nebraska | 115 | 34 | 0 |
| Nevada | 77 | 0 | 0 |
| New Hampshire | 1 | 0 | 0 |
| New Jersey | 2 | 0 | 0 |
| New Mexico | 18 | 11 | 0 |
| New York | 29 | 0 | 0 |
| North Carolina | 15 | 0 | 0 |
| North Dakota | 0 | 7 | 42 |
| Ohio | 9 | 0 | 0 |
| Oklahoma | 88 | 0 | 0 |
| Oregon | 26 | 23 | 35 |
| Pennsylvania | 21 | 0 | 0 |
| Rhode Island | 0 | 0 | 0 |
| South Carolina | 19 | 0 | 0 |
| South Dakota | 0 | 0 | 79 |
| Tennessee | 8 | 0 | 0 |
| Texas | 0 | 234 | 0 |
| Utah | 10 | 0 | 0 |
| Vermont | 0 | 0 | 0 |
| Virginia | 19 | 0 | 0 |
| Washington | 34 | 0 | 0 |
| Washington, D.C. | 1 | 0 | 0 |
| West Virginia | 0 | 0 | 0 |
| Wisconsin | 57 | 0 | 0 |
| Wyoming | 0 | 13 | 0 |

== High school eight-man football ==
Of the 30 states that sponsor the 1,161 eight-man teams in the nation, teams are categorized by "class", "division", or "districts" with sub-conferences within each. States may elect to use either a playoff format or a "bowl game" format (Jamboree). For states with few eight-man teams, no official postseason is organized, instead electing for "Conference Champions".

Playoff format: States that elect a playoff format will seed teams based on regular season records and conference standings. Depending on the sizes of each class, division, or district, the playoff bracket is adjusted accordingly. Teams will advance through the bracket until a state champion is crowned.

Bowl Game format: States that elect a bowl game format, also known as a Jamboree, will seed teams based on regular season records and pair them against like-seeded opponents (i.e. #1 vs #1, #2 vs #2, #3 vs #3, and #4 vs #4). In this format, teams play one postseason game as there is no advancement through levels as in a playoff format.

== Game play ==
Eight-man football consists of fast-paced games with higher scoring than the traditional game. Eight-man scores vary depending on the offensive and defensive strategies. Scores typically fall in the 40-60 point range, with "high scoring" games reaching the 70s and "low scoring" games falling below 30. Eight-man football is noted for producing multi-skilled players that are responsible for playing several positions, which require speed, agility, and strength.

=== Offense ===
A variety of offensive formations can be used in eight-man football, most of which are converted from traditional eleven-man formations. Eight-man football rules require five players to be on the line of scrimmage with players on each end remaining pass eligible. The interior of the line consists of two guards and a center. Most often, the line players on the edges of the formation are tight ends, or are occasionally split wide as wide receivers. Due to reduced sized teams requiring players to know different positions, players' jersey numbers do not affect pass eligibility, but most teams follow the general guidelines set forth by the eleven-man game.

Attempting the extra point kick after a touchdown is less common in eight-man, due to the lack of specialized kickers and holders and the inability to block defenders from interfering with the kick. For this reason, teams often attempt a two-point conversion instead. This is another reason why 8 man is very high scoring.

=== Defense ===
General defensive alignments in eight-man football consist of defensive linemen, linebackers, and defensive backs. Common formations include a 3-3-2, 3-2-3, 4-3-1, 3-4-1, 4-2-2, 5-3, and a 6-2 goal-line defense. The 3-2-3 defense has gained popularity due to the increase of passing-oriented offense in the eight-man game. It substitutes the third linebacker for another defensive back. Most of these formations put stress on linebackers. that is why they have to be some of the best tacklers on the field.

=== Special teams ===
Eight-man football includes special teams units similar to the traditional format. One notable difference is significantly fewer teams using field goal or extra point units, instead electing to go for a fourth down conversion or a two-point conversion. Additionally, many teams opt to onside kick instead of kick deep. This saves players' energy since there are often few backups.

== Popularity in countries outside the U.S. ==
The Israel Football League, an eight-man league was established in Israel in 2005 with three teams, Haifa Underdogs, Tel Aviv Pioneers and Tel Aviv Sabres. The league was established by Israeli players and activists under the leadership of Ofri Becker, and though playing without equipment, this was the first ever tackle football league in this country, named Israeli Football League (IFL). In March 2008, at the end of the first season played in full gear, the Big Blue Jerusalem Lions defeated the Real Housing Haifa Underdogs 24 – 18 in overtime in Israel Bowl I. In Israel Bowl II in April 2009, the Dancing Camel Modi'in Pioneers defeated the defending champions Big Blue Jerusalem Lions 32 – 26 after two overtimes. The game was decided by a whole field interception return for a TD by Pioneers' Ohad Naveh. That season was played with five teams after the expansion franchise of Jerusalem Kings was added. The 2009–2010 season was played with seven teams, introducing two new franchises, the Beer Sheva Black Swarm and the Judean Rebels. In the 2010–2011 season, an eighth team was added (The Herzliya Hammers), and the league was split into 2 divisions, IFL North and IFL South. The 2011–2012 season saw 10 teams, with five in each division, North and South. The North Division consisted of the three Tel Aviv-area teams: the Sabres, Pioneers and Hammers, as well as the Haifa Underdogs and Naharia North Stars. The South Division was made up of the three Jerusalem-area teams: the Rebels, Lions and Kings, as well as the Petah Tikva Troopers and Be'er Sheva Black Swarm. The IFL continued to expand for the 2012–2013 season, adding another Tel Aviv-area team, the Rehovot Silverbacks. Due to the odd number of teams, the IFL abandoned the North and South Divisions, and now each team plays every other team in the league one time during the 10 game season.

An eight-man league is also played in Ireland. This league, named DV8, is used as developmental league for rookies before they go on to compete in the 11man IAFL. As of 2009, six teams were competing in the DV8 league. The format is also growing in England, predominantly in the north west, with the formation of the 8GL starting in September 2020. As of 2020, there were four teams making up the northern conference and the southern conference had three teams.

== See also ==
- Six-man football
- Nine-man football
- Arena football
