= Kolbotn Kodiaks =

American football team in Norway

Team Logo

Kolbotn Kodiaks is the name of an American football team located in Kolbotn, Norway and former affiliate of the NoAFF now NAIF, One of 3 teams to form the Norwegian American Football Federation (Oslo Vikings and Vålenga Trolls).

Moved from Kolbotn to Furuset in 1999 and folded in 2003. However in 2011 Kolbotn Hunters was started to continue the football tradition in Kolbotn.

== Notable players ==
- Jan-Arild Kirkerud - LB
- Dag Wigum - QB
- Lasse Bolle - OT
- Georg Svendsen - DT
- Einar Kornelliusen - LB
- Helge Hansen - LB
- Alexander Krogh - TE
- Terje Bakkeli - TE
- Arne Rønning - DL

== Notable coaches ==
- Bob Sebro Head coach

(Born: 3/9/1959 College: Colorado, NFL Experience: 1 Season 1982, St. Louis Cardinals)

- Morten Midtsund Ass. coach

(Born: 1/2/1964 College: None, NFL Experience, None)

Player Kolbotn Kodiaks 1989-1996

Coach Kolbotn Kodiaks 1997

Coach Oslo Vikings II 1998-1999

Coach Furuset/Hellerud Panthers 2000-2003

Head coach Nordstrand Bandits 2008

Coach Kolbotn Hunters 2012 - 2014

Also coached women's flag football with moderate success for several years

Also writes/contribute for Amerikansk Fotball, Webzine for American football in Norway
