= Tromsø Trailblazers =

Norwegian American football team

The Tromsø Trailblazers were an American football team based in Tromsø, Norway. They were members of the Norway American Football Federation (NoAFF).
