= Kraft Family Sports Campus =

Jerusalem sports stadium

- Location in Israel Location in Jerusalem
- Interactive map of Kraft Family Sports Campus
- Address: Sacher Park, Ben Zvi st.
- Location: Jerusalem 31.80416
- Coordinates: 31°48′15″N 35°12′03″E
- Operator: American Football in Israel
- Surface: Artificial turf

Construction
- Opened: 2017; 9 years ago

Tenants
- Israel national American football team Israel men's national flag football team Israel women's national flag football team Jerusalem Lions

Kraft Family Sports Campus is the home stadium of American Football in Israel. They host the Israel national American football team, Israel men's national flag football team and Israel women's national flag football team. They are also the home stadium of the Jerusalem Lions. It is sponsored by the New England Patriots owner Robert Kraft.

The campus covers approximately 25 acres of land. In 2024, the campus included three sports fields, one being the American football field. The campus supports youth programs for baseball and soccer. It also hosts lacrosse competitions.

Kraft Family Sports Campus hosted its first international competition in 2019. The International Federation of American Football game was part of the European competition for the year. They were selected to host the IFAF Flag Football World Championship in 2021.

Prior to the opening of the campus in 2017, the Kraft Family Stadium was the only football stadium in the country. It was not regulation size, being only 80 yards long and too narrow.
