= Gal Mesika =

Israeli athlete (born 1988)

Gal Mesika גל מסיקה
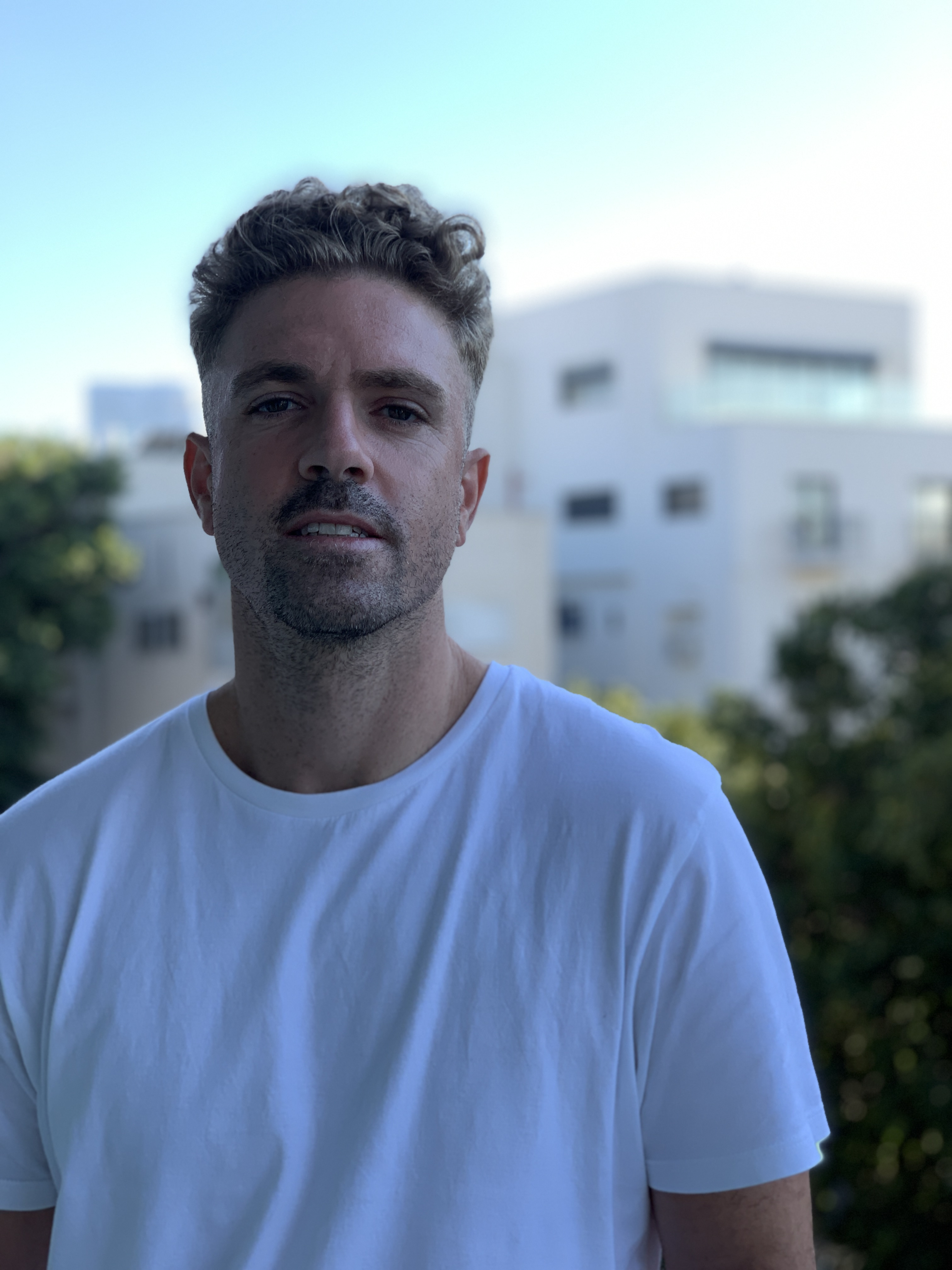

Personal information
- Full name: Gal Mesika
- Date of birth: June 29, 1988 (age 38)
- Place of birth: Herzliya, Israel
- Height: 1.81 m (5 ft 11 1/2 in)
- Position: Goalkeeper

Youth career
- Maccabi Herzliya

Senior career*
Years	Team	Apps	(Gls)
2007–2009	Maccabi Herzliya	4	(0)
2007–2008	Hakoah Amidar Ramat Gan (loan)	1	(0)
2009–2010	Maccabi Kafr Kanna	25	(0)
2010	Hapoel Kfar Shalem	1	(0)
2010–2011	Shimshon Bnei Tayibe	10	(0)
2011–2012	Hapoel Bnei Lod	22	(0)
2012–2013	Hapoel Ra'anana	2	(0)
2014	Amishav Petah Tikva	15	(1)
2014–2015	F.C. Kafr Qasim	16	(0)
2015	Maccabi Netanya	0	(0)
Total		96	(1)

International career
2006	Israel U-18	2	(0)
2006–2007	Israel U-19	15	(0)
- * Club domestic league appearances and goals

Gal Mesika
Profile
- Position: Placekicker

Personal information
- Born: 29 June 1988 (age 38); Herzliya, Israel
- Listed height: 5 ft 11.3 in (1.81 m)
- Listed weight: 165 lb (75 kg)

Gal Mesika (Hebrew: גל מסיקה; born June 29, 1988) is an Israeli American football and association football player.

== Biography ==
Gal Mesika was born in Herzliya to a Tunisian-Jewish family. His father was also a footballer who played for Maccabi Herzliya and also served as the CEO of the club from 1996 to 2009.

== Sports career ==
In association football he is a goalkeeper who has played for many teams including Hapoel Ra'anana in 2013-2014 Maccabi Netanya in 2015. He was the also previously the starting goalkeeper for the Israel national under-19 football team.

In 2015, Mesika made the transition into playing American football, and joined the Israel national American football team as a placekicker. After seeing Mesika play, Robert Kraft stated he expected to soon see an Israeli play in the NFL. In February 2016 Mesika was invited to be the first ever Israeli to try out for the NFL.

== See also ==
- Sports in Israel
