= Mazkeret Batya Silverbacks =

American football team in Israel

- Founded: 2012
- League: Israel Football League
- Team history: Rehovot Silverbacks (2012–2014)
- Location: Mazkeret Batya, Israel
- Colors: Yellow and Silver
- Head coach: Mano Amsalem

The Mazkeret Batya Silverbacks are a semiprofessional American football team based in Mazkeret Batya, Israel. The Silverbacks compete in the Israel Football League (IFL).

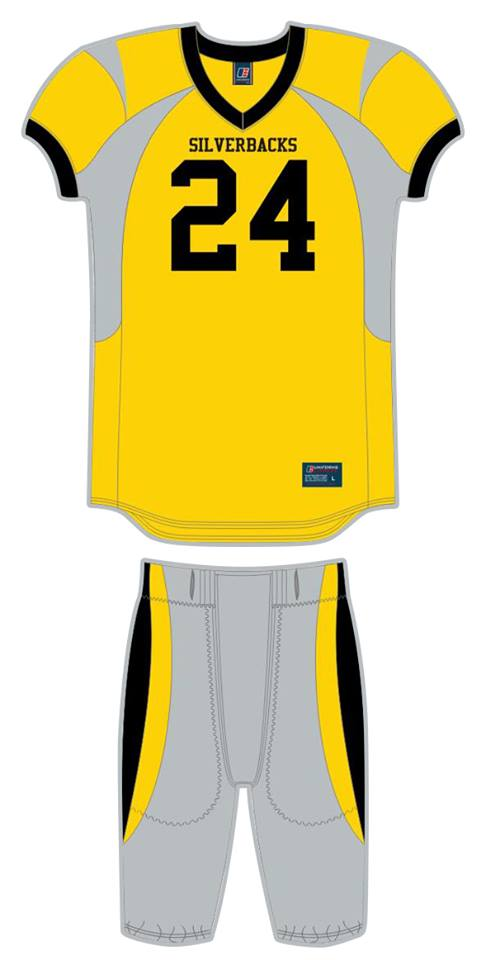
Silverbacks uniform

== History ==
The Silverbacks first played during the 2012–2013 season as the Rehovot Silverbacks. They did not win a single game during their first two seasons and in 2014 they moved to Mazkeret Batya, which is located just five kilometers southeast of Rehovot. They achieved their first ever win in December 2014, when they defeated the Jerusalem Kings.

The Silverbacks reached the playoffs for the first time in 2018 despite only finishing 2-8.

Season	W	L	T	Result
2012–2013	0	10	0	Missed playoffs
2013–2014	0	9	0	Missed playoffs
2014–2015	3	7	0	Missed playoffs
2015–2016	2	8	0	Missed playoffs
2016–2017	0	10	0	Missed playoffs
2017–2018	2	8	0	Lost Quarterfinals

== Sponsor ==
The Silverbacks were once sponsored by Rose Valley CrossFit in Ness Ziona, Israel.
