= Be'er Sheva Black Swarm =

American football team in Israel

Be'er Sheva Spartans
- Founded: 2009
- League: Israel Football League
- Location: Be'er Sheva, Israel
- Stadium: Amphipark
- Colors: Black and red
- Head coach: Noam Dalal

The Be'er Sheva Spartans are a semiprofessional American football team based in Be'er Sheva, Israel. The Spartans compete in the Israel Football League (IFL).

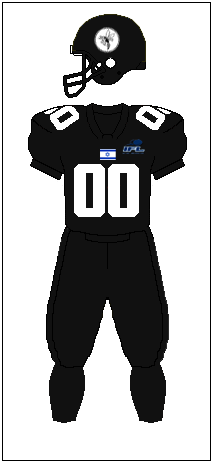
Black Swarm uniform

== History ==
Be'er Sheva joined the IFL in 2009 under the name "The Black Swarm" as an expansion team, along with the Judean Rebels. Despite never achieving a winning record, the Black Swarm have made the playoffs three times; losing in the first round each time. The Black Swarm play their home games at Amphipark, an outdoor amphitheater in Be'er Sheva.

Season	W	L	T	Result
2009–2010	0	10	0	Missed playoffs
2010–2011	3	7	0	Lost Quarterfinals
2011–2012	3	7	0	Missed playoffs
2012–2013	4	6	0	Missed playoffs
2013–2014	2	7	0	Missed playoffs
2014–2015	3	7	0	Missed playoffs
2015–2016	3	7	0	Lost Quarterfinals
2016–2017	2	7	1	Lost Quarterfinals
2017–2018	2	8	0	Missed playoffs
