= Åsane Seahawks =

American football and cheerleading team in Bergen, Norway

- Founded: 1998
- League: Division I
- Based in: Bergen, Norway
- Stadium: Rolland Field
- Colors: Orange and Black
- Head coach: Fredric Frøyen
- Championships: Division I: 2015

Åsane Seahawks is the name of an American football and cheerleading club located in Åsane, Norway that currently competes in Division I of the Norwegian Federation of American Sports (NAIF). They have also played in the top-tier Eliteserien of Norway. The team borrowed its name and logo from the Seattle Seahawks of the National Football League. The club was founded in March, 1998 and are affiliated with the association football club Åsane Fotball.

== Team history ==
=== Founding ===
The Seahawks were founded on March 10, 1998 by Jon Torstein Bakken. In 1985, Bakken spent a year as an exchange student at Forks High School, about 140 miles west of Seattle. While in the US, he was convinced by fellow students to try American football, where he played placekicker and defensive end. He was also introduced to the Seattle Seahawks. After his exchange year in the United States, Bakken became ambitious in forming an American football team in his hometown of Bergen.

The Seahawks football team is currently undefeated for the past two seasons, as well as winning the Division I title. Led by coaches Detjen and Reeve, the Seahawks built a stout defense and an impressive offense, led by players such as Hasse Hellan, Endre Rasmussen, Bård Langva, Mauricio Salazar, Ragnar Tundal, Torgeir Tundal, Kristoffer Botten, Pepe Martinez, Gustav Tisthamar, Tarje Garmann, Alex Hansen, and Inge Sundfjord.

=== Play style ===
The Seahawks are known for their power run offense and 46 Bear style defense. Coach Mark Reeve preaches the philosophy that one or two plays can be more valuable to a team than a big and complicated playbook. The two plays they ran during their 2015 campaign were a HB power and a FB dive. These two plays won them every game of the regular season, except against Olavs Menn; the Seahawks initially won the game, but were stripped of the win when the Norwegian Federation found out about an illegal formation used twice in the game. In the season finale against the Haugesund Hurricanes the Seahawks opened up their playbook and added a naked bootleg for their quarterback. This turned out to be the only play they needed to run to win this game. With the arrival of head coach Simon, in 2016, the Seahawks have added two new plays to their playbook, a QB screen and the swinging gate. These new plays are unorthodox and have brought a different dynamic to the Seahawks' power run offense. The Seahawks defense is led by Christian Detjen and is known as the 46 Norwegian blitz, this defense is known for stopping the run and getting to the quarterback. It emphasizes on not giving up yards to opposing teams.

== Cheerleaders ==
The Seahawks cheerleaders are one of the winningest cheerleading squads in Norway the last years. One of their most recent accomplishments is the bronze medal from the 2008 European Cheerleading Championship in Slovenia.

The inaugural cheerleading squad consisted mainly of girlfriends of the players from the American football team. They were trained by Jon Bakken's wife, Hege Manum.
