= American Football in Israel (organization) =

Governing body of American football in Israel

- Formation: 1988; 38 years ago
- President: Steve Leibowitz
- Website: https://afi.co.il

American Football in Israel (AFI) is the governing body of all American football activities in Israel, including the Israel Football League and various flag football leagues, and is a member of the International Federation of American Football.

== History ==
In 1988, American emigrants Steve Leibowitz and Danny Gerwirtz founded the American Touch Football in Israel (ATFI) league. It was a natural outgrowth of the informal pick-up games started in 1984 by Arnie Draiman. The ATFI grew into a popular touch football league and in 2002, after thirteen years of touch football, renamed itself American Football in Israel and adopted flag football rules. In 2005, the Israel Football League, a previously pick-up American football league founded by Ofri Becker, merged with the AFI and began organized play with helmets, pads, referees and coaches with the AFI serving as governing body.

The AFI has grown to five tackle and flag football leagues, including some 90 teams and over 2000 players. In each league, teams play in colored jerseys displaying the team sponsor.

The Moshiko AFI men's contact league is six-on-six and played according to AFI rules. In 2008, Stevie's Boyz came back from a 21-0 deficit to upset Big Blue in the Holyland Bowl, the national flag football championship game.

AFI operates a successful women's league, the WAFI, and the Israeli national women's team is regarded as one of the top teams in the world. The team took first place at Big Bowl III (2009) in Germany, and at the 2008 Flag Oceane tournament in Le Havre, France.

In the fall of 2005, the co-ed non-contact league and boys' non-contact high school league used for the first time EFAF/NFL Flag Football Rules, which is five-on-five.

In February 2006, American Football in Israel hosted an international flag football tournament at Kraft Family Stadium in Jerusalem. Known as "Flag in Jerusalem", the event marked the first time the State of Israel hosted a sanctioned international flag football competition. Six teams participated in the event including the Italian national team and Germany's Waldorf Wanderers, plus two American and two Israeli teams composed of some of the best talent the AFI had to offer.

In 2008, the first edition of the Israel Bowl was organized.

== See also ==
- Israel Football League
- Anglo-Israelis
