= Jerusalem Lions =

American football team in Israel

- League: Israel Football League
- Location: Jerusalem
- Stadium: Kraft Family Sports Campus
- Colors: Blue and Gold
- Head coach: Gane Medad

The Jerusalem Lions, commonly known as the Jerusalem "Big Blue" Lions, are a semiprofessional American football team based in Jerusalem. The Lions were a founding member of and currently compete in the Israel Football League.

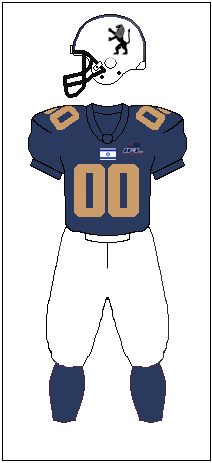
Jerusalem Lions uniform

== History ==
The Lions began as a flag football team in American Football in Israel, which was the precursor to and is now the governing body of the Israel Football League (IFL). In 2005, the Lions were one of the four founding teams of the IFL and in 2007 played in the inaugural IFL season.

They have appeared in seven Israel Bowls and won IsraBowl I, IsraBowl X, IsraBowl XI and, most recently, IsraBowl XII against the Petah Tikva Troopers.

Season	W	L	Result
2007–2008	8	1	Won IsraBowl I
2008–2009	5	3	Lost IsraBowl II
2009–2010	6	4	Lost IsraBowl III
2010–2011	9	1	Lost Semifinals
2011–2012	10	0	Lost Semifinals
2012–2013	6	4	Lost Quarterfinals
2013–2014	7	2	Lost IsraBowl VII
2014–2015	5	5	Lost Quarterfinals
2015–2016	8	2	Lost Semifinals
2016–2017	9	1	Won IsraBowl X
2017–2018	10	0	Won IsraBowl XI
2018–2019	9	0	Won IsraBowl XII

== Sponsorship ==
The Lions are sponsored by Big Blue Travel, a travel agency based in New York, which has led to their nickname "Big Blue."

== Stadium ==
The Lions play their home games at the Kraft Family Sports Campus in Jerusalem.
