= Jerusalem Kings =

Defunct American football team in Israel

The Kings
Helmet

General information
- Founded: 2008
- Stadium: Kraft Family Stadium, Jerusalem
- Headquartered: Jerusalem, Israel

League / conference affiliations
- Israeli Football League

Current uniform
Home

Away

The Jerusalem Kings were a semiprofessional American football team based in Jerusalem and a member of the Israel Football League (IFL). The team played its home games at Kraft Family Stadium. A year after a rule was instituted limiting the number of foreigners on a roster, the team disbanded after the 2014–2015 season. Most players who wished to continue playing in the IFL joined the Judean Rebels. A crown was added to the Judean Rebels logo in memory of the Kings.

== History ==
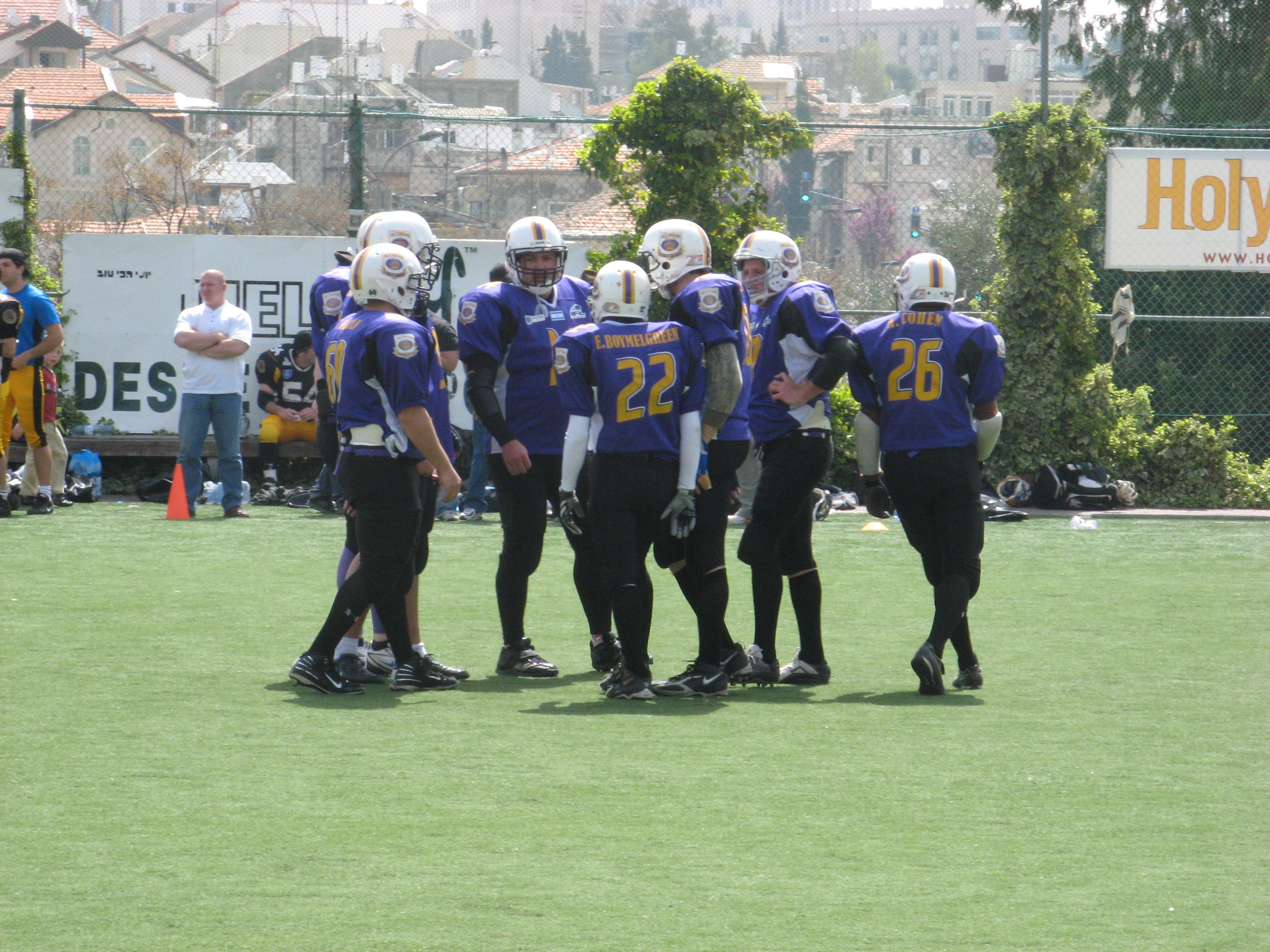
Kings vs. Underdogs in 2009

=== 2008 season ===
The Jerusalem Kings began as the fifth franchise in the IFL and the second team based in Jerusalem (following the Jerusalem Lions). The Kings finished their inaugural season with a record of 1-7.

=== 2009 season ===
The Kings improved in their second year and finished the regular season with a record of 6-4 before taking third place in the IFL playoffs by beating the Judean Rebels.

=== 2010–2011 season ===
The Kings took a step back in their third year and finished the regular season with a record of 1-9.

=== 2012–2013 season ===
The Kings finished in a three-way tie for fourth place with a record of 5-5 along with the Judean Rebels and Haifa Underdogs. The Kings and Rebels made the playoffs due to point differential. The Kings beat the 8-2 Hatikva Hammers on a last second Hail Mary pass in the first round, then lost to the eventual champion Tel-Aviv Sabres in the semi-finals.
