= Tel Aviv Pioneers =

Israeli American football team

Pioneers
- Established: 2005
- Based in: Tel Aviv
- Home stadium: Tel Aviv University Stadium
- League: Israel Football League
- Website: http://tlvpioneers.com

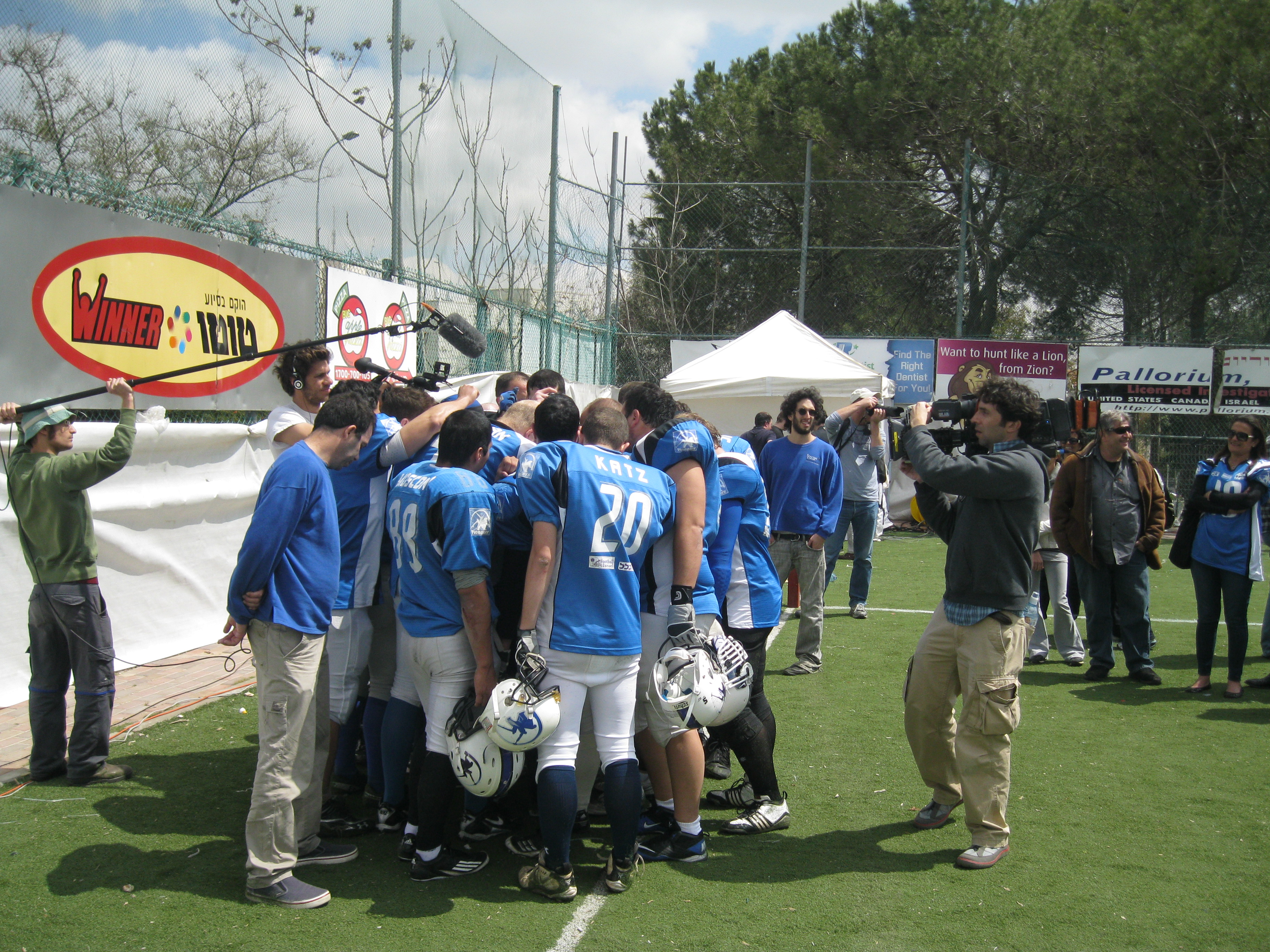
Pioneers at Israel Bowl V

The Tel Aviv Pioneers are a semiprofessional American football team based in Tel Aviv, Israel, playing in the Israel Football League (IFL).

== History ==
The Pioneers were one of the four founding teams of the IFL in 2005. They previously played in Ramat HaSharon and Modi'in but moved to Tel Aviv in 2010.

The Pioneers won the Hans Foler Becker Trophy with their victory in Israel Bowl II. The Pioneers next made the Israel Bowl when they lost to the Tel Aviv Sabres in Israel Bowl V. The Pioneers then won Israel Bowl VII against the Jerusalem Lions.

From 2015–2017, the Pioneers made three consecutive Israel Bowl appearances, but lost all of them; twice to the Judean Rebels (Israel Bowl XIII, Israel Bowl IX) and once to the Jerusalem Lions (Israel Bowl X).

The Pioneers most recently won the Israel Bowl XVI against the Ramat HaSharon Hammers, 42-36.

== Sponsors ==
From their inception, the Pioneers' leading sponsor has been the Dancing Camel Pub & Brewery in Tel Aviv.

Since the 2011–2012 season, Clal Insurance and Football Israel join the Pioneers as primary sponsors.
