= Ramat HaSharon Hammers =

American football team in Israel

Hammers
- Established: 2010
- Based in: Ramat HaSharon
- Home stadium: Ramat HaSharon New Stadium
- League: Israel Football League

Current uniform
Home

Away

The Ramat HaSharon Hammers are an American football team based in Ramat HaSharon, Israel, playing in the Israel Football League (IFL).

The Hammers were founded by former Tel Aviv Sabres Head Coach David Miller and were established in 2010 as the eighth expansion team to enter play in the IFL. In October 2010 the team became a part of the IFL and started playing its first season. With its first game, the team got an historical victory over the Jerusalem Kings 38–8. The team won its first Israbowl championship in 2022, in an 18-14 victory over the Tel Aviv Pioneers.

== History ==
=== 2010–11 season ===
The team played 10 regular-season games and in its first season and had a 3–7 record. The team won against the Jerusalem Kings and twice against the Haifa Underdogs. The Hammers finished in 3rd place in the North Division and qualified for the IFL Playoffs, losing to the Tel Aviv Pioneers in the first round.

=== 2011–2012 season ===
The team Played 10 regular season games and in its second season and had a 3–7 record. Won twice against the new "Northern Starts" and against the Be'er Sheva Black Swarm. The Hammers finished in 4th place in the North Division and did not make the IFL Playoffs.

=== 2022 season ===
Led by quarterback Avrami Farkash, MVP wide receiver/defensive back Dani Eastman, and coach Avi Eastman, the Hammers went an undefeated 10-0 in the regular season. In the playoffs, the team won 44-40 against the Beit Shemesh Rebels, then beat the Tel Aviv Pioneers to win Israbowl XV, 18-14. The victory was sealed with a last-minute goal line stand by the Hammers at their own 6 yard line. Dani, brother David, and father Avi Eastman would all win their third Israbowl, as the team would win their first championship in its first appearance.

== Stadium ==
In the early days of the 2012–2013 season, the Hammers officially moved to Ramat HaSharon, and ever since, they have been the local American football team. The Hammers play in the Ramat HaSharon soccer field, at the intersection of Derech Dudu Dotan and Hativat Alexandroni.
