= Judean Rebels =

American football team in Israel

Beit Shemesh Rebels
Logo

General information
- Founded: 2009
- Stadium: Beit Shemesh Stadium
- Headquartered: Beit Shemesh

League / conference affiliations
- Israel Football League

Championships
- League championships: 0; 3 (2011, 2015, 2016)

The Beit Shemesh Judean Rebels (up until 2019-Judean Rebels) are a semiprofessional American football team in the Israel Football League. The Rebels represent the city of Beit Shemesh and the Gush Etzion settlements and they play their home games at the Beit Shemesh Stadium.

== History ==
The Rebels joined the Israel Football League (IFL) as an expansion team in 2009. While the Rebels are a settler team, they have also included Palestinian players.

In their second season, they won IsraBowl IV over the Tel Aviv Sabres. The Rebels have also won IsraBowl VIII and IsraBowl IX.

In 2019, the organization moved from Jerusalem to Beit Shemesh along with their high school team, the Beit Shemesh Warriors.

Season	W	L	Result
2009–2010	6	4	Lost Semifinals
2010–2011	8	2	Won IsraBowl IV
2011–2012	7	3	Lost Quarterfinals
2012–2013	5	5	Lost IsraBowl VI
2013–2014	9	0	Lost Semifinals
2014–2015	9	0	Won IsraBowl VIII
2015–2016	8	2	Won IsraBowl IX
2016–2017	6	4	Lost IsraBowl X
2017–2018	7	3	Lost Semifinals
2018-2019	3	6	
