= Haifa Underdogs =

American football team in Israel

Underdogs
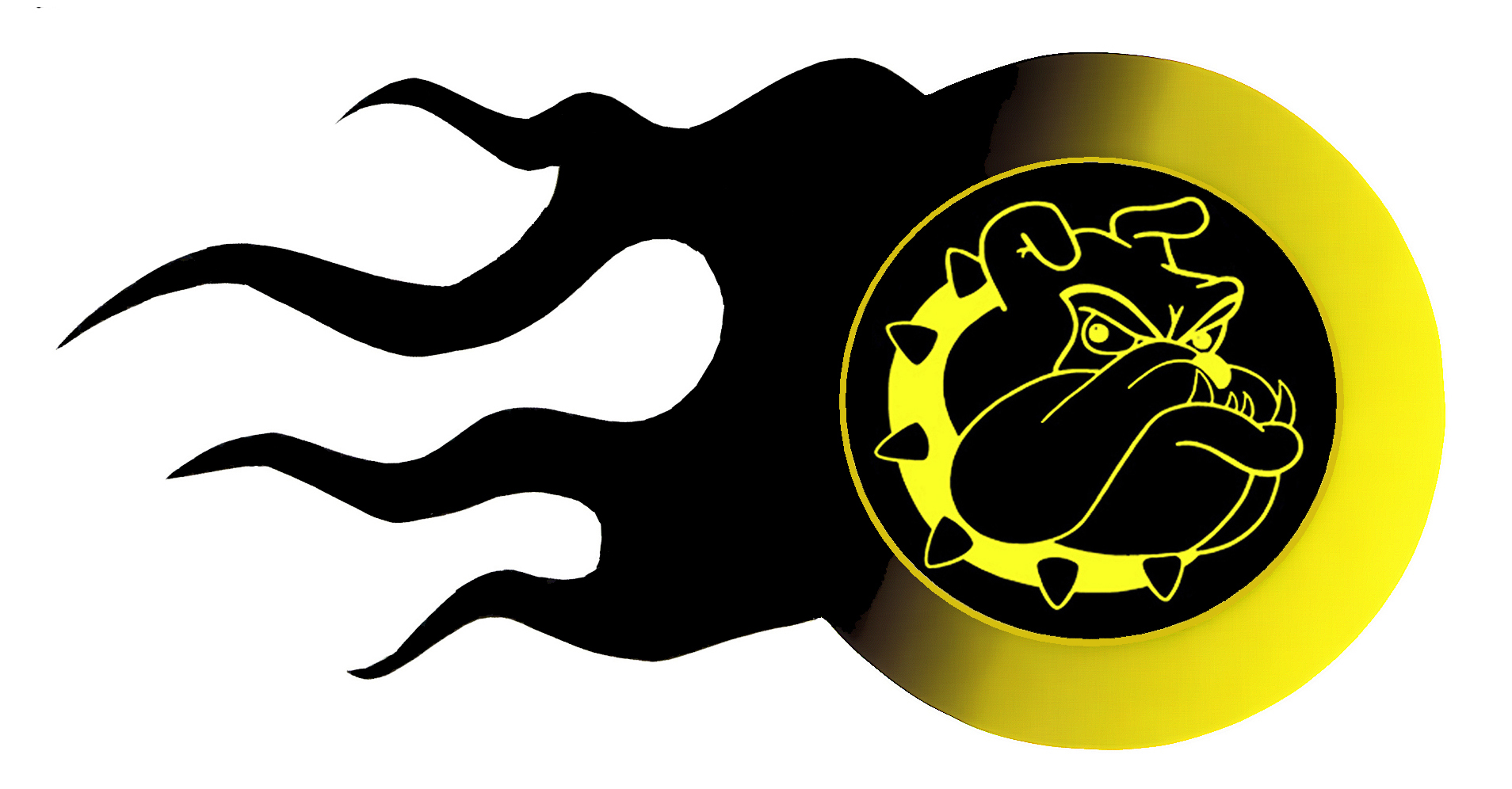
Logo

General information
- Founded: 2005
- Stadium: Hahotrim
- Headquartered: Haifa

Personnel
- Head coach: Ran Breuer

League / conference affiliations
- Israeli Football League

Championships
- League championships: 0; 1

Current uniform
First

Second

Third

The Underdogs are a semiprofessional American football team based in the north of Israel, playing in the Israeli Football League (IFL).

The Underdogs were established in 2005, the year that the IFL was established. In 2007 team became a part of the IFL, which was at the time joined under the AFI (American Football in Israel).

== History ==
The 1990s and 2000s - Unofficial games

American football in Haifa has been played weekly since the 1990s and in 2000s (decade) was mainly located at Haifa's "Sportec" field. The games were unofficial, and gathered players from Haifa, Krayot, Nahariya, Ein HaShofet, and from other places in the North of Israel. Parallel to those games, similar games took place at Tel Aviv's "Sportec" field played by the residents of Gush Dan. Once a month or so, friendly games were scheduled between the Haifa's players and Tel Aviv's players. Most of those games ended with the victory of Tel Aviv's team, which in turn led to the Haifa's team name, the Underdogs, reminding the players that the team's place and respect must be earned each time they take the field.

=== 2005-06 Season - The Israeli Football League ===
In 2005 the club was established as Haifa's first and only representative in the Israeli Football League. In the season of 2005-06, the club won the first ever IFL championship. In the finals, that took place at the Baptist village, on June 23, 2006, the Underdogs defeated the Tel Aviv Pioneers by the score of 37-14.

=== 2006-07 Season - First fully equipped season ===
In 2007, the IFL, and the Underdogs along with it, joined forces with the AFI to form the first fully equipped tackle football league in Israel. The equipment meets the NCAA standards. In its first season, the league featured 4 teams: Haifa Underdogs, Tel Aviv Sabres, Tel Aviv Pioneers, and Jerusalem Lions. Some of the players that participated in the unofficial games in Haifa were the ones to become the coaches and captains of the Underdogs club, and together with their colleagues from Tel Aviv, and the AFI, founded the Israeli (tackle) Football League.

=== 2007-Present - Israeli Football League ===
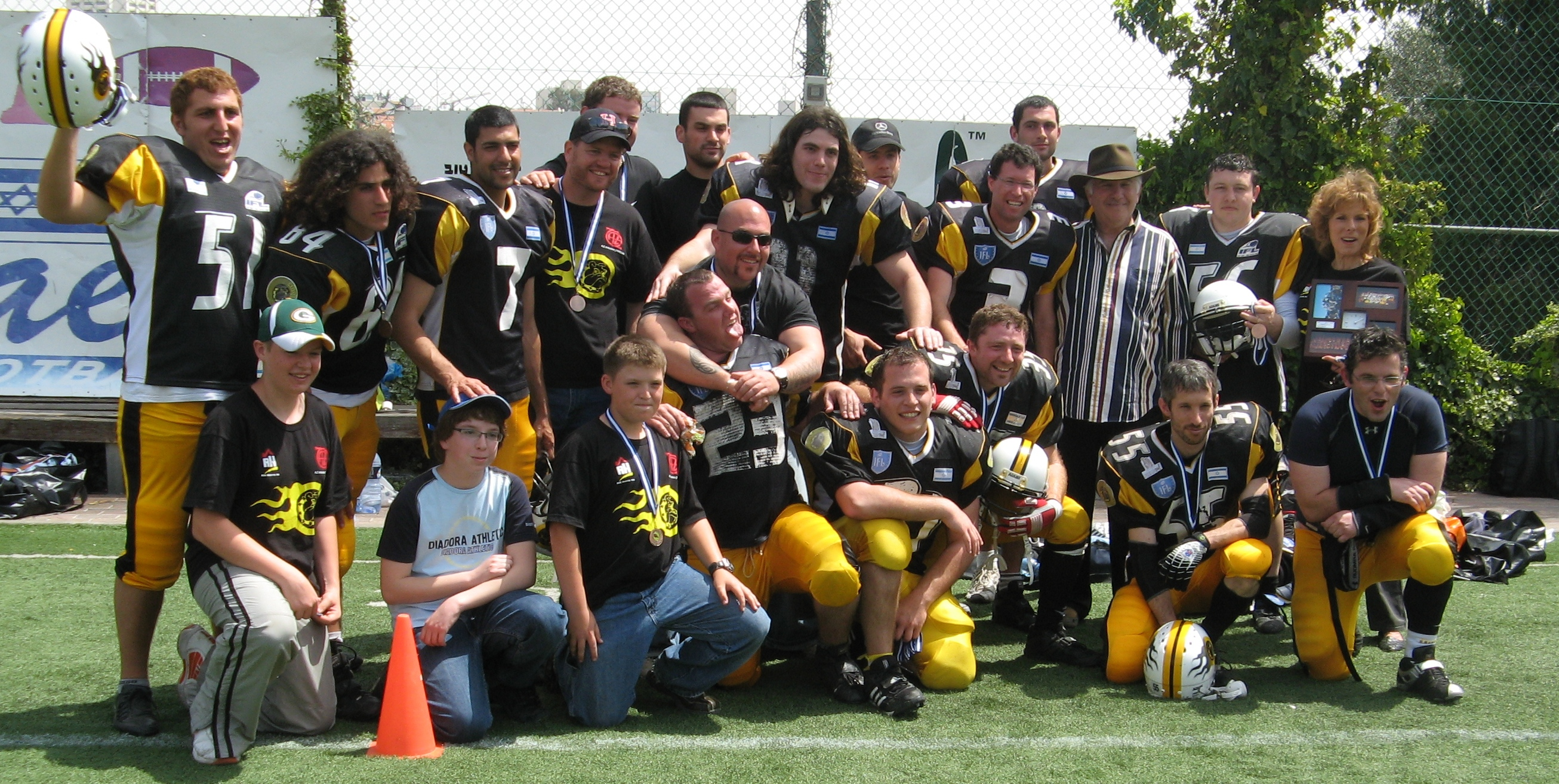
Haifa "Real Housing" Underdogs team, 2008

In the season of 2007-08, Haifa Underdogs won over Ha'Sharon Pioneers team in the semifinals, but lost in the finals to the Jerusalem Lions in overtime, at the end of the inaugural season, after a very tight game.

In the 2008-09 season, the league grew to five teams. That season, the Underdogs were undefeated for most of the season, losing their last two games to the Jerusalem Lions and Modi'in Pioneers. Haifa Underdogs finished the regular season in second place. The Underdogs were again knocked out of the playoffs by the Jerusalem Lions on a touchdown pass with five seconds remaining in the game. The Underdogs later won the consolation game against the Jerusalem Kings.

In the 2009-10 season, the league grew to seven teams, and the Underdogs were coached by Jay Armstead and Alan Hearn. Captained by Itamar Levin, Niv Medlinger, Roei Ziv, and Shahar Yeshurun, the Underdogs got off to a good start to the season with a 4-1 record good enough for first place mid-season. Nevertheless, the Underdogs could not get another victory for the rest of the season, losing their final five regular season matches and the wild card game against the Judean Rebels.

In the 2010-11 season the team accepted a large number of new inexperienced young players. Their results dropped with the Underdogs finishing in fourth and last place in the North Division.

In the 2011-12 season the team made it to the wild card stage. Surprisingly, they defeated previous champions Judean Rebels, scoring 91 points when the Rebels' had no answer to the Underdogs' rushing game.

== Logos and uniforms ==
The team's uniforms are black and white with yellow detail, with the club's logo of a blazing bulldog on the crest.

== Stadium ==
The lack of fields in Haifa is a problem for the Underdogs. There is one soccer stadium in the city (Kiryat Eliezer Stadium) but cannot be used for any purposes other than soccer. Many venues have rejected the Underdogs' requests to be named as the Underdogs' home field. As of the 2007-08 season, the Underdogs played their home games at Kibbutz Ein HaShofet, outside of Haifa.

Shortly after the start of the 2008-09 season, the Underdogs changed their home stadium to Yokneam Stadium. The new field, located near the Yokneam Mall, is closer to Haifa and overall a better field.

As of 2017 The Underdogs host their home games at Kibbutz Hahotrim.

== Roster 2017-2018 ==
*Captains

Haifa Underdogs roster
Quarterbacks: 17 Ron Dafni; Running backs: 9 Hillel Merran; 20 Ido Leffel; Full backs: 11 Amitay Kauffman; Wide receivers: 16 Matan Fourier; 30 Dan vardi; 80 Omer Hasson; Tight ends: 88 Amitai Chubinsky*; Offensive linemen: 62 (C) Asaf Israel*; 78 (LG) Yuda Arkin; 66 (RG) Carmel Barak; 55 (G) Paul Gendrop	Defensive linemen: 54 (DE) Rephael Blum; 6 (DE) Rudy Rattner; 76 (DE) Oscar Naftaly; 96 (DE) Shon KIbutzany; 70 (DT) Lee Shaked*; Linebackers: 58 Mica Alon; 47 Yair Zilberstein; 94 Maor Agai; 51 Nabil Khoury; 33 Shaked Batat; 43 Roei Rozenhak; Defensive backs: 34 (S) Harrison Duke Fearnley*; 2 (S) Elior Kanfi; 37 (S) Yevgeni Yodovin; 21 (S) Aviv Kruvi; 26 (S) Jerome Alfonsi; 24 (CB) Aviv Sarig; 12 (CB) Dennis Noha; 90 (CB) Shay Lamdan	Special teams: 34 (P/K/PR/KR) Harrison Duke Fearnley*; 88 (Long Snapper) Amitai Chubinsky*; 2 (K) Elior Kanfi; Coaching staff: Head Coach Ran Breuer; Defense Coach Jay Armstead; WR/DB Coach Nimrod Smith; RB/LB Coach Niv Medlinger; Special Teams Coach Roy Gluska

== Coaching history ==
Year	Coach	Trophies
2005–2006	Ori Shterenbach	Champions. *
2007–2008	Ori Shterenbach	Finalist.
2008–2009	Ori Shterenbach	Lost in the semi-finals to Jerusalem Lions.
2009–2010	Jay Armstead	Lost in playoffs to Judean Rebels.
2010–2011	Ori Shterenbach	Finished 1-9, failed to reach playoffs.
2011–2012	Ori Shterenbach	Finished 6-4, lost in the semi-finals to Tel-Aviv jafo Sabers..

* before the merge of IFL and AFI

=== Managerial history ===
From	To	Nationality	Head coach
2005	2009	(Israel)	Ori Shterenbach
2009	2010	(United States)	Jay Armstead
2010	2016	(Israel)	Ori Shterenbach
2016	2017	(United States)	Jay Armstead
2017	Present	(Israel)	Ran Breuer

== Sponsors ==
Since the team's establishment, the main sponsor of the team is the real estate company "Real Housing", managed by Chaim and Nancy Brown.
