= Tunisia national American football team =

Tunisia

Home

Away
- Federation: Africa (IFAF)
- Founded: 2017
- Colors: Red, white

First international
- Tunisia 42–0 Monarques de Saint-Denis (Saint-Denis, France; 12 November 2017

Biggest win
- Tunisia 42–0 Monarques de Saint-Denis (Saint-Denis, France; 12 November 2017

Biggest defeat
- None

IFAF World Championship
- Appearances: None
- Best result: None

The Tunisia national American football team (Arabic: منتخب تونس لكرة القدم الأمريكية), nicknamed Les Aigles de Carthage (The Eagles of Carthage or The Carthage Eagles), represents Tunisia in international American football competitions.

== History ==
=== Founding and membership of IFAF ===
The Association Tunisienne de Football Américain (AFTA) was founded in 2017, and is the governing body for the sport of American football in Tunisia.

=== The Tunisian national team of American football ===
The country's official senior national men's football team is controlled by AFTA and is recognized by the International Federation of American Football (IFAF). AFTA offers full-contact football in Tunisia.

The team played their first match ever against Monarques de Saint-Denis on November 3, 2017, winning the match with 42-0.

== IFAF World Championship ==
=== IFAF World Championship record ===
Year	Position	GP	W	L	PF	PA
(Italy) 1999	Did not participate					
(Germany) 2003	Did not participate					
(Japan) 2007	Did not participate					
(Austria) 2011	Did not participate					
(United States) 2015	Did not participate					
~~(Australia) 2019~~	Postponed to 2023					
~~(Germany) 2023~~	Postponed to 2025					
2025	To be determined					

== See also ==
- Tunisia national football team
- Tunisia national minifootball team
- Tunisia national futsal team
- Tunisia national beach soccer team
