= Brazil national American football team =

Brazil
- Nickname: Brasil Onças (Brazil Jaguars)
- Association: Confederação Brasileira de Futebol Americano (CBFA)
- Confederation: IFAF Americas
- Region: South America
- Color: Green, yellow, blue & white
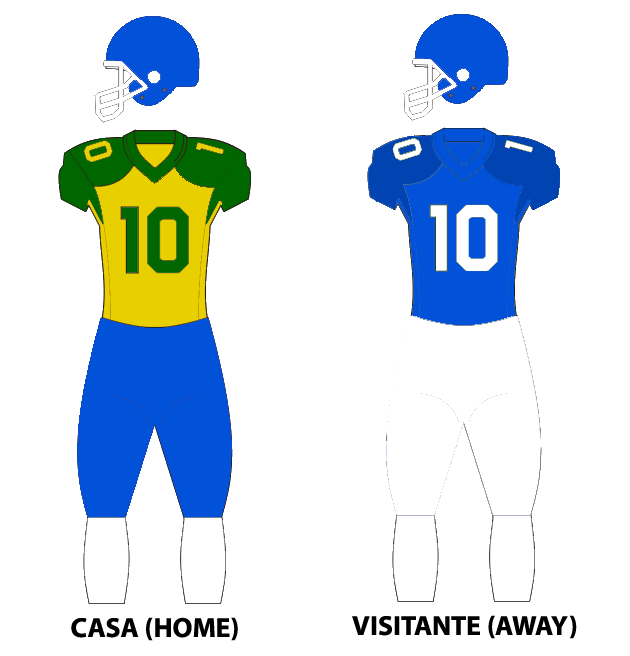
- Uniform
- Head coach: Brian Guzman

First international
- Brazil 14–20 Uruguay (Montevideo, Uruguay; 17 November 2007)

Biggest win
- Brazil 49–0 Uruguay (Montevideo, Uruguay; 26 April 2014)

Biggest defeat
- Brazil 6–31 France (Canton, Ohio, United States; 9 July 2015)

IFAF World Championship of American Football
- Appearances: 1 (first in 2015)
- Best result: 7th (2015)

The Brazil national American football team (Portuguese: Seleção Brasileira de Futebol Americano) represents Brazil in international American football competitions. The team is controlled by the Confederação Brasileira de Futebol Americano (CBFA).

== History ==
=== 2000s ===
The team was first convened in 2007 due to an opportunity to play a friendly game with Uruguay.

The Brazil team was first formed with players drafted from regional (state or city) tournaments that had various shapes and sizes. These tournaments included beach American football, flag football and touch football. The tryouts included interstate matches, physical tests and the availability of the athletes to participate since none of them were professionals.

The first game resulted in a bitter defeat against Uruguay, in Montevideo, by a score of 20–14.

Despite several initial difficulties, the team had representatives from states of Mato Grosso, Rio de Janeiro, Santa Catarina and São Paulo. The general organization of the sport was already well established, more teams and tournaments were on the process of being created and the popularity of the sport was growing (mostly due to the broadcast of NFL games by ESPN).

In 2008, the national team had a much stronger squad. Using the same methodology as the previous year, the team was able to field new reinforcements. Athletes from three other states (Paraná, Distrito Federal and Minas Gerais) were drafted to play its second game, this time at home, but by request of the other side, again the Uruguay national team, the game had to be cancelled, causing great disappointment to the athletes and everyone involved in the organizing of the event.

In 2009, a national tournament first occurred. The best teams from each member state were chosen by the states to represent them in the tournament. The coaches of the Brazil national team now had an easier job in comparing their athletic abilities. In 2013, the Torneio Touchdown had 20 teams, some of them having naming partnership with famous association football clubs.

There is also a parallel federation with a separate national tournament, but the Brazilian team may draft players from this tournament as well, despite having a lower quality level in general.

The Brazil team, along with Uruguay and Argentina, became members of the international entity IFAF.

=== 2010s ===
Brazil defeated Uruguay 49–0 on 26 April 2014. Heron Azevedo was named MVP of the game.

The Women's National Team contested the World category in the months of June and July 2010 in Sweden.

== Overall record ==
Below is table of the representative American football matches played by a Brazil national team at test level up until 16 December 2017.

Opponent	Played	Won	Draw	Lost	Win %	For	Aga	Diff
Argentina	1	1	0	0	100%	38	0	+38
Australia	1	0	0	1	0,0%	8	16	–8
Chile	1	1	0	0	100%	33	0	+33
France	1	0	0	1	0.0%	6	31	–25
Panama	1	1	0	0	100%	26	14	+12
South Korea	1	1	0	0	100%	28	0	+28
Uruguay	2	1	0	1	50.0%	63	20	+43
Total	8	5	0	3	62.5%	202	81	+121

== Tournament history ==
=== IFAF World Championship of American Football ===
Year	Position	Played	Won	Drew	Lost	Pts F	Pts A	D	Played	Won	Drew	Lost	Pts F	Pts A	D
(Italy) 1999	Did not enter								—						
(Germany) 2003	Did not qualify								Did not enter						
(Japan) 2007	Did not qualify								Did not enter						
(Austria) 2011	Did not qualify								Did not enter						
(United States) 2015	7th	3	1	0	2	42	47	–5	1	1	0	0	26	14	+12
Total	1/5	3	1	0	2	42	47	–5	1	1	0	0	26	14	+12
