= Hugo Lira =

Mexico gridiron football player (born 1978)

ITESM CCM
- Title: Head coach

Personal information
- Born: 11 January 1978 (age 48); Querétaro City, Mexico
- Listed height: 5 ft 10 in (1.78 m)
- Listed weight: 174 lb (79 kg)

Career information
- College: UDLAP (1998–2002)
- NFL draft: 2003: undrafted

Career history

Playing
- Frankfurt Galaxy (2003–2004); Berlin Thunder (2005); Carolina Panthers (2005)*
- * Offseason or practice squad member only

Coaching
- UVM Querétaro (2005–2006) Head coach; ITESM CEM (2007–2011) Wide receivers coach; ITESM Puebla (2012–2021) Head coach; ITESM CCM (2022–present) Head coach

Awards and highlights
- World Bowl champion (XI)

Hugo Lira
Medal record

Men's American football

World University Championship

Wide receivers coach for Mexico
Gold medal – first place	2014 Uppsala	Team
Gold medal – first place	2016 Monterrey	Team
Gold medal – first place	2018 Harbin	Team

Hugo Israel Lira Hernández (born 11 January 1978) is a Mexican gridiron football coach and former wide receiver who is the current head coach of the Borregos Salvajes CCM. He played college football with the Aztecas UDLAP before playing in NFL Europe for three seasons with the Frankfurt Galaxy and the Berlin Thunder, winning World Bowl XI with the former. He also participated in the Carolina Panthers training camp in 2005.

== Playing career ==
A native of Querétaro City, Lira played for the Pieles Rojas del Distrito Federal and the Zorros de Querétaro at the juvenile (18 and under) and intermediate (20 and under) levels before accepting a scholarship to play college football for the Aztecas UDLAP. He played the running back position and helped his team achieve back-to-back ONEFA runner-up finishes in 1998 and 1999.

As a professional, Lira played the wide receiver position. In 2003, he was assigned to the Frankfurt Galaxy in NFL Europe. He won World Bowl XI in his first year when the Galaxy defeated the Rhein Fire 35–16. The following year, the Galaxy reached World Bowl XII, where Lira returned two kickoffs for 94 yards, though his team was defeated by the Berlin Thunder 30–24. He joined the Berlin Thunder for the 2005 season. He recorded three receptions for 24 yards and returned 11 kickoffs for 248 yards. Lira played with the Thunder in World Bowl XIII, where the team lost to the Amsterdam Admirals 27–21.

In July 2005, Lira joined the Carolina Panthers training camp as a national player via an NFL Europe roster exemption. During this time, he was roommates with fellow NFL Europe alum Aden Durde. Lira recorded the last reception of the Panthers' preseason, a six-yard pass from Stefan LeFors to close out their final preseason game. He was released during final roster cuts on 3 September.

== Coaching career ==
In 1995, Lira began coaching at the youth level with the Zorros de Querétaro. After his training camp stint with the Carolina Panthers, he served as the head coach for UVM Querétaro from 2005 to 2006. Lira joined the Borregos Salvajes CEM as their wide receivers coach in 2007.

Lira was hired as the head coach of the Borregos Salvajes Puebla ahead of the 2012 season. In his head coaching debut, he led Puebla to a 44–7 victory over the Legionarios Uninter. They finished with a 5–4 record. In his second year, Lira helped the team achieve promotion to the Grupo Independencia – the highest tier in CONADEIP – after a first-place finish in the Grupo Revolución. In 2015, Lira led Puebla to a 7–3 record and a semifinals appearance. However, the team won just four combined games in 2016 and 2017. Puebla returned to the playoffs in 2019 after achieving a 6–3 regular-season record, but the team was eliminated by crosstown rivals Aztecas UDLAP in the semifinals.

After ten years at the helm of the Borregos Salvajes Puebla, Lira was transferred in early 2022. He was subsequently hired as the head coach of the Borregos Salvajes CCM, who were returning to ONEFA after a seven-year absence in place of the Borregos Salvajes Toluca, who were discontinuing their program.

=== National team ===
Lira was on the Team Mexico coaching staff as a wide receivers coach at three editions of the World University American Football Championship (2014, 2016, 2018), winning three gold medals.

== Personal life ==
Lira was 11 years old when his father died in a car accident. His younger brother, Irak, was nine years old at the time. He went on to play alongside Hugo for the Aztecas UDLAP as a quarterback, wide receiver and kicker. Irak quarterbacked the Pioneros de Querétaro in the team's inaugural season in 2019 and went on to be a quarterbacks coach at the college level.

Lira earned his undergraduate degree in business administration at UDLAP. Several years later while coaching at ITESM, he earned his master's degree in administration of educational institutions. In November 2015, Lira was granted an award by the Monterrey Institute of Technology and Higher Education Puebla campus for encouraging his players to do community work. Over the past three years, his players had volunteered at places such as children's hospitals, orphanages, adult daycare centers, prisons, and juvenile detention centers.
