= United States men's national American football team =

National American football team

United States

Home

Away
- Association: USA Football
- Confederation: IFAF Americas
- Founded: 1984
- IFAF Affiliation: 2002
- IFAF Ranking: 1
- Colors: Red White Blue
- Head coach: Dan Hawkins
- General manager: Todd Bell

First international
- United States 77–0 South Korea (Kawasaki, Japan; July 10, 2007)

Biggest win
- United States 82–0 France (Canton, United States; July 15, 2015)

Biggest defeat
- United States 13–14 Germany (Wrocław, Poland; July 24, 2017)

IFAF World Championship
- Appearances: 3 (first in 2007)
- Best result: Gold (2007, 2011, 2015)

World University Championship
- Appearances: 2 (first in 2016)
- Best result: Silver (2016, 2018)

United States men's national American football team
Medal record

World Championship
| Gold medal – first place | 2007 Japan | Team |
| Gold medal – first place | 2011 Austria | Team |
| Gold medal – first place | 2015 Canton | Team |

World Games
| Bronze medal – third place | 2017 Wrocław | Team |

World University Championship
| Silver medal – second place | 2016 Mexico | Team |
| Silver medal – second place | 2018 China | Team |

The United States National American Football Team, often referred to as Team USA, represents the United States in international men's American Football competitions. It is currently controlled by USA Football and is recognized by the International Federation of American Football (IFAF). The team is currently ranked no.1 in the world in American Football by the IFAF.

Team USA has won the IFAF World Championship three times (most recently in 2015), which are the most championships won by a country for the tournaments. Team USA won a bronze medal at the World Games (2017) and two silver medals in the World University American Football Championship (2016 and 2018).

During 2015, a split between IFAF Paris and IFAF New York occurred, in which IFAF Paris expelled USA Football in 2017. USA Football was temporary replaced by the United States Federation of American Football in Paris, while New York retained USA Football as their active member. The United States Federation of American Football would manage the 2017 national team at the World Games.

In March 2018, the Court of Arbitration for Sport (CAS) determined that the IFAF New York was the proper governing entity and voided all decisions of the other IFAF entity, including their decision to strip USA Football of its recognition. USA Football is currently the internationally recognized sole governing body for American football in the United States.

== Player eligibility ==
The national team was selected to encompass a cross-section of amateur football in the United States, and as such USA Football used strict criteria to select team members. This does not permit the top football players in the United States to compete. The criteria are applied to make international tournaments more competitive. The restrictions include:

- NFL players are ineligible
- Player must have graduated from college, making active college players ineligible
- All levels of NCAA and NAIA athletics are required to be represented, not just FBS

An exception to these criteria however, applies to the Summer Olympic Games for the United States national flag football team, as NFL executive Peter O'Reilly stated in October 2023 that the National Football League will work with the players' union on allowing current and former NFL players to participate for Team USA in Flag football at the upcoming 2028 Summer Olympics.

== IFAF World Championship ==
=== 2007 ===
The United States competed for the first time in the 2007 IFAF World Championship. The team's first ever game was a 77–0 win over South Korea in the first round of the tournament. Team USA defense set an IFAF all-time tournament record in holding South Korea to minus-31 yards in total offense, as well as the record for fewest rushing yards allowed with minus-47. In the second round the USA defeated Germany 33–7. They played Japan on July 15 for the championship. Japan was making their third appearance in the finals, winning the previous two World Championships. Japan took a 17–10 lead with seven minutes and seven seconds left in regulation. University of Arizona quarterback Adam Austin guided Team USA with an 11-play, 80-yard drive that ended with the second 5-yard touchdown run by RB Kyle Kasperbauer, to tie the game at 17. IFAF follows the overtime system used by the NCAA, and both teams scored field goals with their first possession. In the second overtime, Japan got the ball first but missed a 34-yard field goal attempt. Team USA then reached Japan's 6-yard line. On 4th and one, Craig Coffin kicked the game winning 22-yard field goal, with the final score at 23–20. University of Nebraska-Omaha running back Kyle Kasperbauer was named MVP of the game after scoring two touchdowns and running for 54 yards on 15 carries. Austin finished 12 of 25 for 109 yards, with no TDs, and one interception. Former Williams player Jon Drenckhahn was the top receiver, catching 5 passes for 40 yards.

The team included players representing all levels of college football, with 13 from NCAA Division I FBS, 12 from NCAA Division I FCS, 10 from NCAA Division II, 9 from NCAA Division III and 1 former NAIA player.

2007 USA national football team roster
| Quarterbacks: 8 Adam Austin (Arizona); 12 Jeff Ballard (TCU); 3 Rocky Pentello (Capital); Running backs: 28 Doug Blakowski (Hobart); 2 Cody Childs (Wisconsin–Stevens Point); 26 Kyle Kasperbauer (Nebraska-Omaha); 5 Wendell Johnson (Fairmont State); Wide receivers: 81 Greg Aker (Minnesota-Duluth); 88 Bobby Awrey (Saginaw Valley State); 82 Jon Drenckhahn (Williams); 9 Steve Odom (Toledo); Tight ends: 91 D'Monn Baker (California (Pa.)); 35 Brian Thompson (Michigan) | Offensive linemen: 65 Alex Atkins (Tennessee-Martin) G; 62 Marcel Burrough (San Jose State) G; 72 Rick Drushal (Wooster) T; 78 Kris King (Gardner–Webb) C; 77 David Livengood (Indiana (Pa.)) G; 60 Chris Lundin (Adams State) T; 66 Matt Padron (Texas State) T; 58 Brad Poston (Coastal Carolina) T; Defensive linemen: 11 Dustin Dlouhy (Montana) E; 95 Ryan Kleppe (Wisconsin–Whitewater) T; 97 Matt Ludeman (Western Michigan) E/T; 40 Shawn Moorehead (Iowa State) E; 55 Chris Thorner (Syracuse) T; 50 Jeremy Van Alstyne (Michigan) E | Linebackers: 43 Dan Adams (Holy Cross); 54 Demetrius Eaton (Northwestern); 52 Adam Paulson (Sioux Falls); 37 Ryan Tully (Harvard); 21 Brig Walker (Princeton); Defensive backs: 20 Manauris Arias (Maine) CB; 24 Diezeas Calbert (Northwest Missouri State) CB; 33 Kenny Chicoine (Cal Poly) S; 32 Jason Hoffschneider (North Dakota) FS; 25 Josh Kubiak (Mary Hardin–Baylor) FS; 14 Rob Rodriguez (Christopher Newport) CB; 30 Steve Teeples (Wisconsin–La Crosse) CB; 6 Cary Wade (Virginia Tech) FS; Special teams: 4 Craig Coffin (Southern Illinois) P/K | Head coach: John Mackovic; Assistant coaches: Bob Berezowitz; Richard Cundiff; George Darlington; Adam Dorrel; Clayt Birmingham; Trainer: Yosuke Murashima; Equipment manager: Taylor Hanohano; Director of operations: Todd Bell; Roster accessed 2009-02-23 |

=== 2011 ===
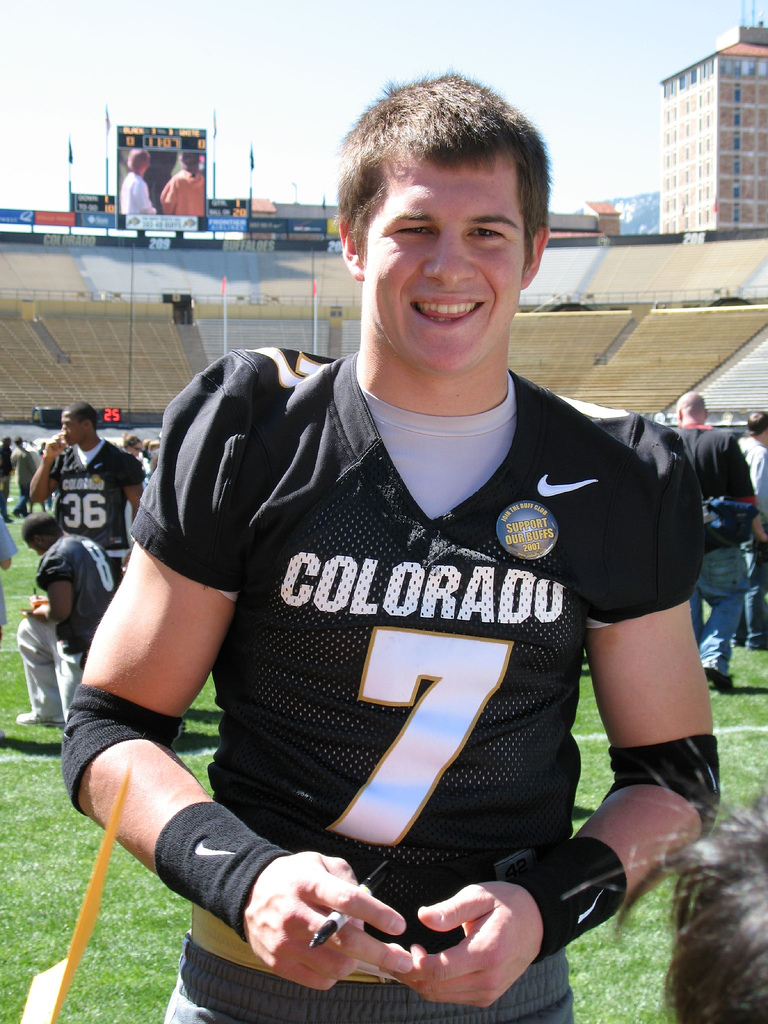
Cody Hawkins, quarterback of the United States 2011 World Championship team.

The head coach of Team USA was Mel Tjeerdsma of Northwest Missouri State University, with Larry Kehres the offensive coordinator and Lou Tepper the defensive coordinator. Team USA played its first game on July 8, 2011, defeating Australia 61–0. After beating Mexico 17-7 on July 11, the team qualified for its 2nd consecutive World Cup gold medal game. On July 16, U.S. defeated Canada 50–7 to claim its second consecutive World Championship.

The United States routed Canada 50–7 in the gold medal game of the 2011 IFAF Senior World Championship. The 20,000 fans in attendance at Ernst Happel Stadium in Vienna, Austria, set a record for an IFAF Championship game. The game was never close, with Team USA leading 37–7 at halftime. Team USA dominated the rushing game, outgaining Canada 247–48, with four players scoring touchdowns on the ground. While Henry Harris led the way for the Americans on the ground, with 114 yards on 15 carries and a TD, Mount Union RB Nate Kmic was the only American to score two touchdowns on the day and was named tournament MVP. University of Colorado quarterback Cody Hawkins was 13 of 21 for 161 yards and 2 TD passes. Ricardo Lenhart (Otterbein) led the receivers, with 3 catches for 63 yards. The U.S. defense recorded four sacks, and Jordan Lake caught two interceptions.

2011 USA national football team roster
| Quarterbacks: 5 Matt Bassuener; 7 Cody Hawkins; 13 Ben McLaughlin; Running backs: 40 Richie Brockel FB/TE; 32 Henry Harris; 1 Nate Kmic; 25 Da'shawn Thomas; Wide receivers: 3 Greg Betterson; 2 Ricardo Lenhart; 20 Taylor Malm; 8 Korey Williams; Tight ends: 88 Mike Peterson | Offensive linemen: 58 Brandon Jordan; 72 Frank Knights; 65 Josh Koeppel; 70 Luke Summers; 77 Dane Wardenburg; 60 Cameron Zipp; Defensive linemen: 91 Charles Bay DE; 51 Gerard Bryant DL; 99 Daniel Calvin DT; 55 Daniel Catalano DE; 93 Wacey Coleman DL; 92 Johnny Dingle DT | Linebackers: 42 Demetrius Eaton; 43 Terrence Jackson; 56 John Jacobs; 6 Lane Olson; 24 Osayi Osunde; 44 Zach Watkins; Defensive backs: 30 Maurice Banks DB; 9 Myles Burnsides DB; 27 Jeff Franklin CB; 21 Jordan Lake S; 12 DeWayne Lewis CB; 33 Joe Sturdivant S; 23 Daniel Tromello DB; 22 Stephan Virgil CB; 29 Diezeas Calbert CB; Special teams: 17 Gregg Berkshire K/P | Head coach: Mel Tjeerdsma; Assistant coaches: Larry Kehres (offensive coordinator); Lou Tepper (defensive coordinator); Steve Berstein (defensive backs); Derrick Williams (defensive backs); Matt Webb (defensive line); Erik Raeburn (offensive line); Mickey Joseph (running backs); Adam Austin (wide receivers); Jordan Brown (tight ends); Director of operations: Jordan Brown; Roster updated 2011-07-08 |

=== 2015 ===
The U.S. Men's National Team was led by former Boise State and Colorado head football coach Dan Hawkins. Hawkins was 53–11 at Boise State from 2001–05, winning four consecutive Western Athletic Conference titles. His teams compiled a 31-game WAC winning streak, the longest in conference history. The U.S. Men's National Team includes athletes from 24 states.

The United States defeated Japan in the gold medal game by a score of 59-12. This marked Team USA's third straight IFAF Championship, which would beat out Japan for the most IFAF Championships.

| Quarter | 1 | 2 | 3 | 4 | Total |
|---|---|---|---|---|---|
| Japan | 0 | 6 | 6 | 0 | 12 |
| United States | 16 | 22 | 7 | 14 | 59 |

at Tom Benson Hall of Fame Stadium, Canton, Ohio, United States

- Date: July 18, 2015
- Game time: 19:00
- Game weather: clear
- Game attendance: 3,000
- Referee: E.Bolstad • Umpire: D.Parsons • Center judge: M.Matos • Linesman: M.Mikkelsen • Line judge: G.Udvardi • Back judge: P.Mercer • Field judge: F.Rasmussen • Side judge: J.P. Canto • Alternate: I.Veronica

2015 USA national football team roster
| Quarterbacks: 11 Kevin Burke (Mount Union); 3 Dylan Favre (University of Tennessee-Martin); Running backs: 6 Sadale Foster (Texas Tech); 27 Nick Griffin (Mississippi State); 4 Talir Satterfield-Rowe (West Virginia State); 28 Aaron Wimberly (Iowa State); Wide receivers: 5 Drew Banks (Middle Tennessee State); 81 Kevin Cummings (Oregon State); 18 Andy Erickson (Texas State); 83 Quillan Mathis (Northwood); 88 Luc Meacham (Mount Union); 87 Brad Smithey (SW Oklahoma State); 13 Trent Steelman (Army); Tight ends: 84 Ernst Brun Jr. (Iowa State); 86 Carrington Hanna (Sioux Falls) | Offensive linemen: 79 James Atoe (Washington); 67 Mike Criste (Washington); 71 Jeremy Galten (Southern California); 70 Randall Harris (Towson); 61 Alex Land (Weber State); 74 Manrey Saint-Amour (Georgia Southern); 76 Charlie Tuttle (Texas State); 73 Zack Williams (Washington State); Defensive linemen: 55 Chris Alvarez (Rowan); 91 Willie Mobley (New Mexico State); 36 Jack Sherlock (South Dakota State); 77 Bryan Wick (Bemidji State) | Linebackers: 44 B. J. Beatty (Colorado); 34 Alex Gross (Columbia); 7 David Guthrie (New Mexico); 50 Steven Kurfehs (Texas-San Antonio); 92 Alec May (Georgetown); 58 Matt Oh (Dartmouth); 35 Scott Thompson (North Carolina State); 40 Derrick Webb (Colorado); 46 Talib Wise (Nevada); Defensive backs: 8 Calvin Burnett Jr. (Indiana State); 1 Bryan Douglas (Boise State); 42 Lucky Dozier (Northern Arizona); 6 Mike Edwards (Hawaii); 41 T. L. Edwards (Middle Tennessee State); 22 Curtis Slater (West Texas A&M); 30 Cliff Stokes (Iowa State); 20 Robert Virgil (Sioux Falls); Special teams: 32 Dan Zeidman (Idaho State) | Head coach: Dan Hawkins; Assistant coaches: Paul Wulff – fffensive coordinator / offensive linemen; Robert Tucker – defensive coordinator; Cody Hawkins – quarterbacks; Darian Hagan – running backs; Dan Morrison – receivers; Jerry Brady – defensive linemen; Isaiah Jackson – linebackers; Matt White – defensive backs; Roster updated 2011-07-08 |

== World Games ==
=== 2017 ===
In 2015 the split emerged between IFAF Paris and IFAF New York, in which IFAF Paris expelled USA Football in 2017. USA Football was replaced by the United States Federation of American Football in Paris, while New York retained USA Football as their active member. Since IFAF New York was not recognized by the International Olympic Committee at the time, the United States Federation of American Football was permitted to organize the United States national American football team for the 2017 World Games.

Players, mainly professional Americans playing in Europe, were chosen for the team. They were promised full funding from the United States Federation of American Football, but the funding was withdrawn just days before the competition and players had to provide their own transportation to Wrocław. As a result, most of the team withdrew from the competition and were instead replaced by amateur volunteers who were already in Europe at the time. Most of the team arrived the day before their opening match vs the Germany national American football team. The Americans lost to Germany 13–14, in which was the first loss ever for a United States National American Football Team in international competition.

| Quarter | 1 | 2 | 3 | 4 | Total |
|---|---|---|---|---|---|
| United States | 0 | 7 | 6 | 0 | 13 |
| Germany | 0 | 7 | 0 | 7 | 14 |

at Olympic Stadium, Wrocław

- Date: 22 July 2017
- Game time: 13:00
- Referee: Perez Canto Juan (FRA)
- Report

The United States were able to rebound two days later and defeat the Poland national American football team 14-7 en route to a bronze medal at the 2017 World Games.

| Quarter | 1 | 2 | 3 | 4 | Total |
|---|---|---|---|---|---|
| United States | 0 | 7 | 0 | 7 | 14 |
| Poland | 0 | 0 | 7 | 0 | 7 |

at Olympic Stadium, Wrocław

- Date: 24 July 2017
- Game time: 13:00
- Referee: Doboczky Zoltan (GER)
- Report

2017 USA national football team roster
| Quarterbacks: 4 Dustin Hawke Willingham; 11 Mike van Deripe; 17 John Preston Rabb; Running backs: 22 Triston McCatheron; 24 Joe Bergeron; Wide receivers: 3 Cam Countryman; 6 Terry Gaitor III; 10 Tyrell Blanks; 12 Mario Brown; 18 Anthony Benson; 80 Nick Sweet; Tight ends: 19 Brett Perkins | Offensive lineme Defensive linemen: 15 Taylor Palmer; 28 Ryan Seaberg; 53 Jabrai Regan; 99 Archie Zaniewski | Linebackers: 2 Oscar Vazquez-Dyer; 5 Meechi Eaton; 25 Gary Stevenson; 40 Nick Reyna; 42 Zachary Blair; 44 Patrick Fitzgerald; Defensive backs: 1 Deante Battle; 7 Davarus Shores; 9 Lamar Hall; 13 Austin Jones; 14 Cody Smith; 16 TJ Richardson; 26 Billy Carlile; Special teams: 27 John Moorhead | Head coach: Rudy Wyland; Assistant coaches: Edward Winston – offensive linemen; Kevin Booker – defensive coordinator; Ethan Buford – special teams; Mark Brobeck – running backs; JC Hardy – receivers; Gavin Campbell – defensive backs; Trainer: Danny Poitier; Equipment manager: Peter Bertha; Roster updated 2017-07-24 |

== IFAF World Championship All-time Records ==
| Nation | Wins | Losses | Pct |
|---|---|---|---|
| Australia | 1 | 0 | 1.000 |
| Canada | 1 | 0 | 1.000 |
| France | 1 | 0 | 1.000 |
| Germany | 2 | 0 | 1.000 |
| Japan | 3 | 0 | 1.000 |
| Mexico | 2 | 0 | 1.000 |
| South Korea | 1 | 0 | 1.000 |

== Competitive record ==
Champions Runners-up Third place Fourth place

=== IFAF World Championship ===
IFAF World Championship
| Year | Result | Position | GP | W | L | PF | PA |
|---|---|---|---|---|---|---|---|
| (Italy) 1999 | Did not participate | | | | | | |
| (Germany) 2003 | Did not participate | | | | | | |
| (Japan) 2007 | Champions | 1st | 3 | 3 | 0 | 133 | 27 |
| (Austria) 2011 | Champions | 1st | 4 | 4 | 0 | 176 | 21 |
| (United States) 2015 | Champions | 1st | 4 | 4 | 0 | 214 | 36 |
| 2025 | Qualified but event was postponed | | | | | | |
| Total | 3 titles | 3/6 | 11 | 11 | 0 | 523 | 84 |

=== World Games ===
World Games
| Year | Result | Position | GP | W | L | PF | PA |
|---|---|---|---|---|---|---|---|
| (Germany) 2005 | Did not participate | | | | | | |
| (Poland) 2017 | Third place | 3rd | 2 | 1 | 1 | 27 | 21 |
| Total | 0 titles | 1/2 | 2 | 1 | 1 | 27 | 21 |

=== World University Championship ===
World University American Football Championship
| Year | Result | Position | GP | W | L | PF | PA |
|---|---|---|---|---|---|---|---|
| (Sweden) 2014 | Did not participate | | | | | | |
| (Mexico) 2016 | Runner-up | 2nd | 4 | 3 | 1 | 145 | 49 |
| (China) 2018 | Runner-up | 2nd | 4 | 3 | 1 | 197 | 23 |
| Total | 0 titles | 2/3 | 8 | 6 | 2 | 342 | 72 |

== Uniforms ==
(United States) United States American Football team uniforms
| Home | Away | Alternate |

== Game records ==
- Most First Downs: 27 vs. Japan 7-12-15
- Most Points Scored: 82 vs. France 7-16-15
- Most Passing Yards: 267 Cody Hawkins vs. Mexico 7-12-11
- Most Rushing Yards: 117 Aaron Wimberly vs. France 7-15-15
- Most Receiving Yards: 106 Nate Kmic vs. Australia 7-8-11
- Most Team Sacks: 8 vs. Mexico 7-9-15
- Most Team Tackles for Loss: 18.5 vs. Mexico 7-9-15
- Longest Play (Rushing): 60 Sadale Foster vs. Japan 7-12-15
- Longest Play (Passing): 64 McLaughlin to Malm vs. Australia 7-8-11
- Longest Play (Punt Return): 74 Awrey vs. South Korea 7-10-07
- Longest Play (Kickoff Return): 84 Awrey 84 vs. South Korea 7-10-07
- Longest Play (Field Goal): 46 Berkshire vs. Mexico 7-12-11
- Longest Play (Interception Return): 77 Banks vs. Germany 7-10-11
- Longest Play (Fumble Return): 10 Jackson vs. Germany 7-10-11
- Longest Play (Blocked Punt Return Touchdown): 26 Calbert vs. Australia 7-8-11
- Longest Play (Blocked Field Goal Return Touchdown): 75 Dingle vs. Germany 7-10-11
