= Shinzo Yamada (American football) =

American football player (born 1973)

- Yamada in 2019

No. 46, 53
- Position: Linebacker

Personal information
- Born: August 9, 1973 (age 53)
- Listed height: 6 ft 0 in (1.83 m)
- Listed weight: 220 lb (100 kg)

Career information
- College: Kwansei Gakuin

Career history
- Memphis Maniax (2001); Amsterdam Admirals (2003); Tampa Bay Buccaneers (2003)*
- * Offseason or practice squad member only

Shinzo "Shin" Yamada (born August 9, 1973) is a Japanese former professional American football player who was a linebacker for the Memphis Maniax of the XFL and the Amsterdam Admirals of NFL Europe. He played college football at Kwansei Gakuin University. He also played for the Tampa Bay Buccaneers during the 2003 NFL preseason. Yamada was believed to be the first Japanese person to play professional American football in the United States.

== Early life and amateur career ==
Shinzo Yamada was born on August 9, 1973. He lived in the United States from fourth grade to eighth grade due to his father having been transferred to work at Sharp Manufacturing Company of America, a Memphis, Tennessee electronic manufacturing plant owned by the Japanese Sharp Corporation. He began playing football in a local youth league. Yamada was a Dallas Cowboys fan.

Yamada's family returned to Japan, where he later played college football at Kwansei Gakuin University. Kwansei Gakuin won the national championship during Yamada's sophomore year of 1993. He helped Japan win the IFAF World Championship in both 1999 and 2003, the only two IFAF championships in the country's history. He was named to the tournament's All-Star Team in 2003.

== Professional career ==
Yamada played football in Japan's X-League for the Asahi Beverage Challengers. He earned X-League West Division MVP honors in both 1998 and 1999, and X-League MVP honors in 2000. On January 3, 2001, he was named the MVP of Tokyo Super Bowl XV. While in the X-League, he worked as a salesman for the Nippon Telegraph and Telephone Corporation.

Kansas City Chiefs assistant defensive line coach Tom Pratt, who had coached Yamada in Japan, told Memphis Maniax head coach Kippy Brown about Yamada. He was considered a longshot to make the regular season roster. He recovered a fumble and posted a few tackles during the Maniax's first scrimmage against the San Francisco Demons. During the final preseason game against the Los Angeles Xtreme, he forced a fumble that led to the game-winning touchdown for Memphis. On February 2, 2001, two days before the regular season opener against the Birmingham Bolts, The Commercial Appeal reported that Yamada would be a backup linebacker and special teams player for the Maniax. After it was announced that he had made the final roster, Yamada started receiving attention from Japanese media. He received over 100 emails a day and also started his own website, www.shinzo-net.com. The XFL had a rule allowing nicknames to be worn on the back of players' jerseys instead of their legal names. Yamada wore the name "Samurai" on his jersey. A Japan Sky Sports crew that came to Memphis convinced Yamada to wear that nickname. He played in all ten games during the 2001 XFL season in a reserve role, recording four solo tackles and one assisted tackle. The Commercial Appeal said that Yamada was believed to be the first Japanese person to play pro American football in the United States. He called plays for the Maniax when he was on the field for passing downs. Yamada made $4,500 per game while in the XFL. The league folded after the 2001 season.

In 2002, Yamada had a tryout with the New York Dragons of the Arena Football League but was not signed. He played in nine games for the Amsterdam Admirals during the 2003 NFL Europe season as a backup inside linebacker, posting three special teams tackles. During training camp in July 2003, the NFL assigned Yamada to the Tampa Bay Buccaneers, several weeks ahead of the American Bowl preseason game in Japan on August 2 between the Buccaneers and New York Jets. The Jets were likewise assigned Yamada's former Admirals teammate, Japanese wide receiver Yoshinobu Imoto. Imoto was reportedly paid $106 a day by the NFL. During a passing drill in practice, Yamada "blanketed" tight end Will Heller, earning praise from John Lynch and Dwayne Rudd. Yamada played in one series for Tampa Bay during the American Bowl. His contract ended after the game.

== Post-playing career ==
On March 21, 2004, Yamada was the head coach of the "All-Japan Samurai Warriors" in an exhibition arena football game against the af2's Louisville Fire, which the Fire won 36–26. In 2012, he was the special teams coordinator for the IFAF World Team at the 2012 International Bowl, played against Team USA. Yamada has also served as a coach and general manager for the Japan national American football team, and as head coach of the X-League's IBM Big Blue.
