= Japan national American football team =

Japan 日本

Home

Away
- Association: JAFA
- Confederation: IFAF Asia
- Founded: 1984
- Colors: Red, white
- Head coach: Kiyoyuki Mori
- General manager: Shinzo Yamada

First international
- Japan 24–14 Sweden (Palermo, Italy; June 28, 1999)

Biggest win
- Japan 88–0 South Korea (Osaka, Japan; February 23, 2003)

Biggest defeat
- Japan 12–59 United States (Canton, United States; July 18, 2015)

IFAF World Championship of American Football
- Appearances: 5 (first in 1999)
- Best result: (gold) Gold: (1999, 2003)

World University American Football Championship
- Appearances: 3 (first in 2014)
- Best result: (2014)

Japan national American football team
Medal record

Men's American football

Representing Japan

World Championship
Gold medal – first place	1999 Italy	Team
Gold medal – first place	2003 Germany	Team
Silver medal – second place	2007 Japan	Team
Bronze medal – third place	2011 Austria	Team
Silver medal – second place	2015 United States	Team

World University American Football Championship
Silver medal – second place	2014	Team
Bronze medal – third place	2016	Team
Bronze medal – third place	2018	Team

The Japan national American football team represents Japan in international American football competitions. The team is controlled by the Japan American Football Association, and has been one of the world's strongest international teams since it began participating regularly in international tournaments in the 1990s, and currently possesses the second most American Football World Cups (1999, 2003).

Japan won the inaugural 1999 IFAF World Championship and won again in 2003. In 2007 they advanced to the final, losing to the United States 23–20 in overtime. In 2010 Japan beat Germany 24–14 in the inaugural Germany-Japan Bowl. In February 2011, Japan bested South Korea (76–0) to qualify for the 2011 IFAF World Championship.

Japan won silver medal (2014) and two bronze medals (2016 and 2018) in the World University American Football Championship.

== IFAF World Championship record ==
Year	Position	GP	W	L	PF	PA
(Italy) 1999	1st	3	3	0	84	14
(Germany) 2003	1st	2	2	0	57	20
(Japan) 2007	2nd	3	2	1	116	23
(Austria) 2011	3rd	4	3	1	103	61
(United States) 2015	2nd	3	1	2	65	109

== 2011 IFAF World Championship roster ==
Japan National American Football Team 2011 IFAF World Championship roster
Quarterbacks: 11 Naoki Maeda QB/WR; 29 Yasuhiro Maruta QB/RB; 6 Shun Sugawara; 8 Tetsuo Takata; 19 Minoru Tono; Running backs: 20 Takuya Furutani; 25 Kosuke Kimiyama; 31 Tomokazu Sueyoshi; Wide receivers: 85 Ryomi Hagiyama; 7 Shoei Hasegawa; 1 Noriaki Kinoshita; 84 Takahiro Haruta TE; 17 Michihiro Ogawa; 87 Yuji Oya TE; 83 Ken Shimizu	Offensive linemen: 77 Haruhisa Hiramoto OL; 71 Yutaro Kobayashi OL; 57 Kazuhiro Kuramochi OL; 75 Tsukasa Miyamoto OL; 67 Yuta Murai OL; 72 Takanari Murakami OL; 70 Tsuneno Sano OL; 73 Yuji Taniguchi OL; Defensive linemen: 53 Motoyuki Hirai DL; 93 Mitsunori Kihira DL; 92 Takeshi Nisikawa DL; 37 Munekazu Shikama DL; 41 Daiki Takechi DL; 43 Yasuo Wakisaka DL; 13 Masayoshi Yamanaka DL; 96 Takayuki Yoneda DL	Linebackers: 10 Kentaro Azuma LB; 2 Naoki Kosho LB; 42 Takashi Makiuchi LB; 55 Akinobu Soma LB; 45 Shoichiro Suzuki LB; 9 Masayoshi Tsukada LB; Defensive backs: 14 Masashi Fujimoto DB; 22 Ryohei Imanishi DB; 21 Koki Kato DB; 16 Takeshi Miyake DB; 24 Tadanari Sano DB; 27 Atsushi Tsuji DB; 36 Yuichi Watanabe DB; Special teams: 15 Daisuke Aoki K/P	Inactive list Roster updated 2011-07-08

== 2014 ==
Preparing for the qualification match for the 2015 IFAF World Championship, the JAFA scheduled an international friendly match against Germany on April 12, 2014, at Kawasaki Stadium in Kawasaki, Kanagawa. 85 players were initially chosen for the national team on March 11 which was whittled down to the required 45-men roster before April 12. Before a crowd of 1,889, Japan defeated Germany 38–0 in a strong defensive showing for the Japanese which limited Germany to only 135 yards of total offense, as well as causing four turnovers and two sacks, the latter of which was all in the second half. Before going against the Philippines, Japan made 5 changes in their roster, replacing WRs Ryoma Hagiyama and Naoki Maeda with Takeshi Akiyama and Junpei Yoshimoto, RB Keita Takanohashi with Takashi Miyako, LB Yuki Ikeda with Yoshiki Tanaka, and S Toshinari Masatani with Takeshi Miyake. Against a young Philippine team that was in its first year in the IFAF, the Japanese showed no quarter, scoring on every offensive possession as well as holding the Philippines to only 1st down en route to an 86–0 victory, the 2nd biggest win in the national team's history. With the win, Japan, along with South Korea (which defeated Kuwait in the other qualification match 69–7) qualified for the 2015 IFAF World Championship tournament in Canton, Ohio, United States.

Japan 2014 final roster
Quarterbacks: 6 Shun Sugawara (Obic); 8 Keiya Hiramoto (Fujitsu); 19 Shohei Kato (Lixil); Running backs: 3 Takashi Miyako (Nojima Sagamihara); 20 Keita Takanohashi (Fujitsu); 25 Eisuke Tomatsu (Nojima Sagamihara); 26 Takuto Hara (Obic); Wide receivers: 1 Naoki Maeda (Lixil); 4 Yasushi Nakagawa (Lixil); 7 Shoma Endo (Panasonic); 15 Takeshi Akiyama (Fujitsu); 17 Yasuhiro Miyamoto (Lixil) WR/K; 24 Naohiko Shibata (Panasonic); 83 Junpei Yoshimoto (Fujitsu); 85 Ryoma Hagiyama (Obic); 87 Yuta Hayashi (Asahi Beer); Tight ends: 41 Tomoaki Ohashi (Fujitsu); 84 Akimitsu Mori (Obic)	Offensive linemen: 57 Tetsuya Seita (Fujitsu) G; 67 Yusuke Yamamoto (Obic) G; 70 Kohei Arai (Lixil) C; 72 Yutaro Kobayashi (Fujitsu) T; 73 Haruhisa Kurokawa (Asahi Soft Drinks) T; 76 Takayuki Suzuki (Panasonic) T; 77 Takehito Noda (Asahi Soft Drinks) T; 78 Masahiro Asano (Panasonic) G; Defensive linemen: 10 Wataru Takeda (Panasonic) T; 50 Shota Tomita (Obic) T; 53 Yo Okamoto (Fujitsu) E; 55 Toru Hirasawa (Asahi Soft Drinks) E; 90 Yoshihiro Nakata (Obic) E; 91 Hiroyuki Shigechika (Lixil) E	Linebackers: 9 Masami Tsukada (Obic); 13 Kensuke Amaya (Lixil); 42 Yuki Ikeda (Kwansei Gakuin); 44 Yusuke Yoshimoto (IBM); 45 Shuhei Takeuchi (Fujitsu); 54 Yoshiki Tanaka (Hosei); 96 Haruka Sawada (Kansai); Defensive backs: 14 Masashi Fujimoto (Obic) CB; 16 Takashi Miyake (Obic) S; 21 Koki Kato (Lixil) CB; 16 Takashi Miyake (Obic) S; 22 Ryohei Imanishi (Panasonic) CB; 23 Hidetoshi Yano (Lixil) S; 27 Atsushi Tsuji (Panasonic) S; 28 Keizaburo Sunagawa (Obic) CB; 36 Toshinori Masutani (Panasonic) S; Special teams: 18 Eita Saeki (Panasonic) P/K	Head coach: Kiyoyuki Mori; accessed 2016-03-09

== 2015 ==
Due to Canada dropping out of the tournament for personal team reasons, Japan was granted a bye on the scheduled match which was supposed to be on July 9 and in turn would play the winner of the Mexico-United States match on July 12. In their first match of the tournament, Japan, despite a strong defensive showing in the first half that included two interceptions and 29-yd field goal block, eventually lost to the United States 18–43. In their second match, Japan defeated Mexico 35–7 with a strong effort on offense and defense. The win ensured the Japanese a rematch with the United States for the gold medal. Team Japan would lose to the United States 12–59 in what is the national team's largest loss in history.

Japan 2015 final roster
Quarterbacks: 19 Katsuya Nagakawa (Lixil) QB/WR; 8 Tetsuo Takata (Panasonic); 10 Shohei Kato (Lixil); Running backs: 20 Takuya Furutani (Obic); 6 Kosuke Kamiyama (Fujitsu); 29 Taku Ri (Waseda); 21 Ryo Takagi (IBM); Wide receivers: 1 Junpei Yoshimoto (Fujitsu); 7 Shoma Endo (Panasonic); 18 Noriaki Kinoshita (Obic); 11 Naoki Maeda (Lixil) RS; 81 Takashi Kurihara (IBM); 83 Yuta Hayashi (Asahi Beer); 80 Yasuhiro Miyamoto (Lixil) WR/K; Tight ends: 88 Takahiro Haruta (Fujitsu) TE/LS	Offensive linemen: 79 Akira Katsuyama (Fujitsu) T; 57 Tetsuya Seita (Fujitsu) G; 78 Kohei Arai (Lixil) C; 66 Shun Mochizuki (Fujitsu) G; 72 Yutaro Kobayashi (Fujitsu) T; 77 Takehito Noda (Asahi Soft Drinks) T; 67 Yusuke Yamamoto (Obic) G; 75 Haruhisa Kurokawa (Asahi Soft Drinks) T; Defensive linemen: 90 Takuya Seike (Obic) T; 92 Mitsunori Kihira (Obic) T; 4 Toru Hirasawa (Lixil) E; 13 Motoyuki Hirai (Fujitsu) E; 41 Ryota Takahashi (Fujitsu) E; 43 Yasuo Wakisaka (Panasonic) T/E; 99 Shota Tomita (Obic) T; 54 Shoichi Shikama (Panasonic) E	Linebackers: 17 Kensuke Amaya (Lixil); 42 Shuhei Takeuchi (Fujitsu); 96 Haruka Sawada (Obic); 45 Shoichiro Suzuki (Fujitsu); 5 Masayoshi Tsukada (Obic); Defensive backs: 14 Masashi Fujimoto (Obic) CB; 22 Ryohei Imanishi (Panasonic) CB/RS; 21 Kento Tojo (Obic) CB; 16 Takashi Miyake (Obic) S; 24 Yuki Ishii (Fujitsu) CB; 27 Atsushi Tsuji (Panasonic) S; 28 Atsushi Fujita (Fujitsu) S; 36 Keizaburo Sunagawa (Obic) CB; Special teams: 26 Shintaro Saeki (Panasonic) P/K	Head coach: Kiyoyuki Mori; Assistant coaches: Tsuyoshi Kawada - assistant head coach; Tominaga Hajime - offensive coordinator/running backs and tight ends; Makoto Ohashi - defensive coordinator; Norikazu Nobuhara - special teams coordinator/secondary; Hayato Arima - quarterbacks; Shoei Hasegawa - wide receivers; Masayoshi Yamanaka - defensive linemen; Masahara Fumitaka - offensive linemen; Gen Arisawa - linebackers; Team doctor: Takeshi Sorimachi; Trainers: Rika Yoshihiro; Shigenobu Okuma; Yoshinaga Takanori; Equipment managers: Tomomi Nakamura; Kunie Makotochu; Shin Nishikawa; Director of operations: Shinzo Yamada; accessed 2016-03-09

== See also ==
- Eyeshield 21
- X-League
