= 2026 Gridiron Nations Championship =

American football season

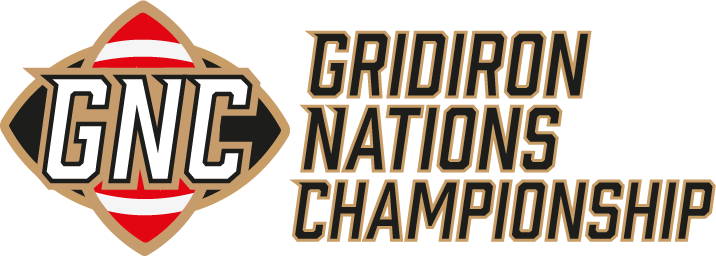

Tournament details
- Host nation: Mexico
- Dates: 12 December 2026 – 19 December 2026
- No. of nations: Three

The 2026 Gridiron Nations Championship is a planned men's international tackle football competition scheduled to take place in Mexico City, Mexico, from 12 to 19 December 2026, during a designated event window branded as GNC Week.

The Tournament was originally scheduled for Panama City, Panama, until the GNC conducted a review due to inflation in travel costs driven by the US-Iran conflict. Canada and Mexico have confirmed participation while Panama is part of an IFAF Tournament of the Americas at that time.

== Background ==
Organizers described the early announcement on 1 March 2026, as intended to support advance planning related to sponsorship development and broadcast partnership discussions, and to continue to position the championship as an annual platform for men's international tackle football.

== Host venue ==
The 2026 event is scheduled to be held in Mexico City, with venues TBD.

== Teams ==
Two national teams have been confirmed for the 2026 edition:

- Canada - Defending champion
- Mexico - Host
