= Ernst Brun Jr. =

American football player (born 1990)

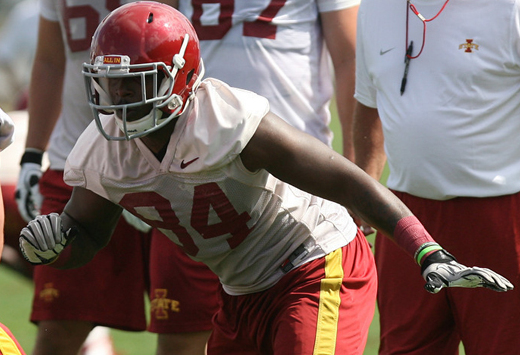
- Brun with Iowa State in 2013

Profile
- Position: Tight end

Personal information
- Born: December 4, 1990 (age 35)
- Listed height: 6 ft 3 in (1.91 m)
- Listed weight: 251 lb (114 kg)

Career information
- High school: Snellville (GA) Shiloh
- College: Iowa State
- NFL draft: 2015: undrafted

Career history
- Washington Redskins (2015)*
- * Offseason or practice squad member only

Ernst Brun Jr.
Medal record

Men's American football

Representing United States

World Championship
Gold medal – first place	2015 USA	Team competition

Ernst Brun Jr. (born December 4, 1990) is an American football tight end. He previously played for the Washington Redskins. He previously played in college at Iowa State as well as the 2015 United States National American Football Team in the 2015 IFAF World Championship.

== College career ==
In his junior year at Iowa State he made 26 receptions for 330 yards and six touchdowns. However his senior year was marked with numerous injuries. He only recorded six catches and 47 yards over eight games. He suffered from a rare form of muscle cramping causing raised creatine phosphokinase levels which dampened his chances in the 2014 NFL draft. Overall, he recorded 32 catches for 377 yards and 6 touchdowns.

== 2015 IFAF World Championship ==
During the 2015 IFAF World Championship in Canton, Ohio, he was part of the United States team led by Dan Hawkins that won a gold medal in the tournament.

== NFL career ==
The Washington Redskins signed him on August 15, 2015. This came on the back of Niles Paul and Logan Paulson being placed on the Injured Reserve list. He was waived on August 31, 2015.
