= Jock Coulter =

Canadian soccer player

Jack Coulter
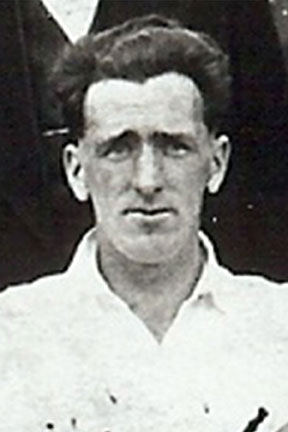

Personal information
- Full name: John Smith Coulter
- Date of birth: 23 January 1902
- Place of birth: Hamilton, Scotland
- Date of death: 15 November 1960 (aged 58)
- Position: Forward

Senior career*
Years	Team	Apps	(Gls)
1922-1924	Garrison	13+	(17+)
1924-1926	Victoria United Services	11+	(33+)
1926-1927	Esquimalt	12+	(22+)
1927-1936	Westminster Royals	108+	(190+)
Total		141+	(262+)

International career
- Canada
- * Club domestic league appearances and goals

Jack “Casey” Coulter or Jock Coulter was the main goal scorer within the great Westminster Royals side, winning three national titles between 1928 and 1936, scoring in eight of the nine final games he played.

== Club career ==
Jock Coulter started his footballing career within the ranks of Garrison, who participated in the Victoria Wednesday League. In an unfinished total, Jock scored 21 goals in 16 official games for Garrison, but was swiftly signed by Victoria United Services. Coulter continued his prolific goalscoring feats for Services and in two years scored 47 goals in 17 official games.

=== Westminster Royals ===
Jock Coulter moved to New Westminster in the summer of 1927, he took up a job in the New West Fire Department and on weekends, he would consistently play for the Westminster Royals. In his first season for Westminster Royals, Jock scored 50 official goals across all competitions, in 31 games. The 1927-28 Westminster Royals side were an immense team that became an influential figure in Canadian soccer history and is regarded as one of the strongest ever to grace a Canadian pitch. Among the many championships the Royals won included the 1928 Vancouver and District First Division league championship, Teacher's Shield, Mainland Cup, Vancouver Exhibition Cup, Province Cup, and OB Allan Cup.

The Royals side would continue their incredible form into the succeeding season as well as Jock Coulter. He totalled 52 goals in 29 games at an average of 1.79 per game. The strong Westminster Royals side commanded the British Columbia. scene in 1928–29 as they did in 1927–28, winning all the major trophies except the main one, the national championship. This season they were surprisingly beaten by Vancouver St. Saviours in the B.C. semi-final by a score of 3–1. The Royals appealed on a technicality. A second semi-final game was played. This time the score was 5–3, again in favour of St. Saviours.

Again, Westminster Royals made their way to the national championship in 1930 and despite losing 5–2 over the course of three games against Montréal CNR they managed to win the championship. This was due to Montréal CNR losing the first game 1–0, then won 5-0 and in the third game the Royals again won 1–0.

Until 1936, Jock Coulter and Westminster Royals went into hiding as they did not win anything major until then. In the national championship they triumphed over United Weston from Winnipeg 6–1 in the first game, but lost the second match 2–1, before going on to win the trophy in the third game 3–0.

== International career ==
Despite not representing Canada, Coulter did represent Victoria against various club selects and more famously against the English FA side that toured Canada in 1926, where he scored the lone goal in a 5–1 loss.

== Career statistics ==
Appearances and goals by club, season, and competition. Only official games are included in this table.
Club	Season	League		National Championship		Regional Cup		Allan Cup		Others		Total	
Club	Season	Apps	Goals	Apps	Goals	Apps	Goals	Apps	Goals	Apps	Goals	Apps	Goals
Garrison	1922/1923	8+	5+	0	0	0	0	0	0	0	0	8+	5+
Garrison	1923/1924	5+	12+	0	0	0	0	0	0	2+	2+	7+	14+
Victoria United Services	1924/1925	11+	25+	0	0	2+	1+	0	0	3+	6+	16+	32+
Victoria United Services	1925/1926	6+	17+	0	0	1+	1+	0	0	4+	14+	11+	32+
Garrison	1926	0	0	0	0	0	0	0	0	1+	2+	1+	2+
Esquimalt	1926/1927	12+	22+	0	0	1+	1+	0	0	1+	3+	14+	26+
Westminster Royals	1927/1928	14	18	10	20	1	1	2	5	4	6	31	50
Westminster Royals	1928/1929	19	31	1	0	3	6	3	7	3	8	29	52
Westminster Royals	1929/1930	9+	14+	7+	13+	3+	9+	1+	1+	2+	1+	21+	38+
Westminster Royals	1930/1931	10+	16+	4+	10+	3+	6+	1+	1+	0	0	18+	33+
Westminster Royals	1931/1932	16+	26	2+	8+	2+	4+	0	0	2+	5+	22+	43+
Westminster Royals	1932/1933	8+	12+	0	0	0	0	0	0	1+	0	9+	12+
Westminster Royals	1933/1934	0	0	1+	2+	0	0	0	0	0	0	1+	2+
Westminster Royals	1934/1935	0	0	1+	1+	0	0	0	0	0	0	1+	1+
Westminster Royals	1935/1936	1+	1+	7+	20+	1+	3+	0	0	0	0	9+	24+
Westminster Royals	1936/1937	0	0	0	0	0	0	0	0	0	0	0	0
Westminster Royals	Total	119+	199+	33+	74+	17+	32+	7+	14+	23+	47+	199+	366+
