= 2025 IFAF World Championship =

American football tournament

Canceled

Tournament details
- Dates: –
- No. of nations: 16

The 2025 IFAF World Championship was scheduled to be the sixth instance of the IFAF World Championship for American football. The games were originally scheduled to be held in Wollongong, Australia, from 29 July to 5 August 2019, but were postponed to 2023 due to the large number of withdrawals from top nations. In October 2022, the tournament was again postponed until 2025.

A global tournament with IFAF teams replaced the World Championships, with Italy hosting Canada on 9 November in Milan, then Germany hosting Canada in the Gridiron Nations Championship on 16 November in Bochum. IFAF did not provide an update on the 2025 event, nor has it announced a replacement event in future years.

During a Q&A on Instagram, Pierre Trochet ruled out a Tackle Football World Championship in the foreseeable future, citing costs and logistics as the main reasons for the failure to organize an American Football World Cup.

== Background ==
=== Bidding process ===
Australia was originally announced by IFAF as the host for the 2019 championship in July 2018. Germany later replaced Australia as hosts of the rescheduled 2023 IFAF World Championship in December 2021. In 2022, the tournament was postponed again to 2025, and IFAF entered talks with the German federation about hosting.

== Qualification ==
Team	Method of qualification	Date of qualification	Finals appearances	Last appearance	Consecutive finals appearances	Previous best performance
United States	Defending champions	18 July 2015	4	2015	4	Winners (2007, 2011, 2015)
Australia	Oceania representative	29 July 2019	4	2015	3	5th place (1999, 2015)
Germany	Host	11 December 2021	4	2011	1	3rd place (2003, 2007)
Italy	Europe 1	31 October 2021	2	1999	1	4th place (1999)
Sweden	Europe 2	31 October 2021	3	2007	1	3rd place (1999)
TBD	Americas qualifier	TBD	TBD	TBD	TBD	TBD (TBD)
TBD	Asian qualifier	TBD	TBD	TBD	TBD	TBD (TBD)
TBD	African qualifier	TBD	TBD	TBD	TBD	TBD (TBD)
