= Matt Bassuener =

American football player (born 1984)

No. 10
- Position: Quarterback

Personal information
- Born: April 8, 1984 (age 42); Port Edwards, Wisconsin, U.S.
- Listed height: 6 ft 1 in (1.85 m)
- Listed weight: 200 lb (91 kg)

Career information
- High school: John Edwards (Port Edwards)
- College: Georgetown
- NFL draft: 2008: undrafted

Career history
- Louisville Fire (2008); Amarillo Dusters (2009); Seinäjoki Crocodiles (2009); Fairbanks Grizzlies (2010); Iowa Barnstormers (2011)*; Tulsa Talons (2011); Fluminense Imperadores (2011); Cleveland Gladiators (2012); Gold Coast Stingrays (2012); Uppsala 86ers (2013); San Antonio Talons (2014); Spokane Shock (2015); Los Angeles KISS (2015)
- * Offseason or practice squad member only

Awards and highlights
- IFAF World Championship (2011)

Career AFL statistics
- Comp. / Att.: 363 / 617
- Passing yards: 4,116
- TD–INT: 66–21
- Passer rating: 91.47
- Rushing TD: 18
- Stats at ArenaFan.com

Matt Bassuener
Medal record

Men's American football

Representing United States

World Championship
Gold medal – first place	2011 Austria	Team competition

Matt Bassuener (born April 8, 1984) is an American former professional football quarterback. He was signed by the Louisville Fire as an undrafted free agent in 2008. He played college football at Georgetown University. He has played professionally in the Vaahteraliiga Finland, for the Seinäjoki Crocodiles and in Sweden Superserien for the Uppsala 86ers. Bassuener was part of the U.S. National Team that won the 2011 IFAF World Championship.
