= James Atoe =

American football player (born 1991)

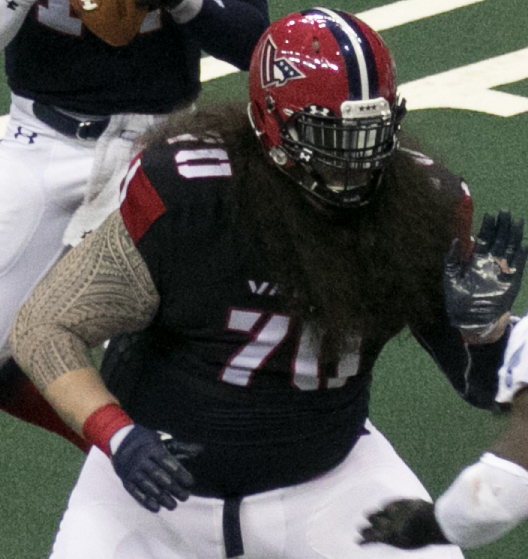
- Atoe with the Washington Valor in 2017

No. 70, 90
- Position: Offensive lineman

Personal information
- Born: October 1, 1991 (age 35)
- Listed height: 6 ft 7 in (2.01 m)
- Listed weight: 375 lb (170 kg)

Career information
- High school: The Dalles (The Dalles, Oregon)
- College: Washington
- NFL draft: 2015: undrafted

Career history
- Colorado Crush (2016); Spokane Empire (2017); Washington Valor (2017–2019)

Awards and highlights
- ArenaBowl champion (2018); Second-team All-IFL (2016)
- Stats at ArenaFan.com

James Atoe
Medal record

Men's American football

Representing United States

World Championship
Gold medal – first place	2015 United States	Team competition

James Atoe (born October 1, 1991) is an American former professional football offensive lineman. He played college football for the Washington Huskies and attended The Dalles High School in The Dalles, Oregon. He was a member of the Colorado Crush, Spokane Empire, and Washington Valor.

== College career ==
Atoe played for the Washington Huskies from 2010 to 2014. He was the team's starter his final year and helped the Huskies to 31 wins. He played in 43 games during his career including 13 starts at guard and 7 at tackle.

=== College statistics ===
Year	Team	Offensive line	
Year	Team	Games played	Games started
2010	Washington	Redshirt	
2011	Washington	3	0
2012	Washington	13	6
2013	Washington	13	0
2014	Washington	14	14
Career		43	20

== Professional career ==
Pre-draft measurables
Height	Weight	40-yard dash	10-yard split	20-yard split	20-yard shuttle	Three-cone drill	Vertical jump	Broad jump	Bench press
6 ft 6 in (1.98 m)	367 lb (166 kg)	5.69 s	1.92 s	3.20 s	5.23 s	8.43 s	27.5 in (0.70 m)	8 ft 4 in (2.54 m)	30 reps
All values from Washington Pro Day

Atoe was invited to the Seattle Seahawks rookie mini-camp as an undrafted free agent, but was not offered a contract. After his tryout with the Seahawks, Atoe was invited to play for the United States national American football team. Atoe helped the United States win the 2015 IFAF World Championship, and was named to the All-Tournament team.

Atoe signed with the Colorado Crush in January, 2016. He was named Second Team All-IFL following the season.

On October 4, 2016, Atoe signed with the Spokane Empire. On January 24, 2017, the Empire placed Atoe on the transfer list.

Atoe was assigned to the Washington Valor on January 17, 2017.
