= IFAF Americas =

- Formation: 2007
- Continental chair: Javier L'Episcopo
- Website: www.americanfootball.sport

IFAF Americas is the federation that governs the sport of American football in the Americas and qualifies teams from North America, Central America, the Caribbean and South America in the IFAF World Championship. It replaced the Pan American Federation of American Football (PAFAF) in 2012. The organization also oversees flag football competitions.

In June 2024, there were 16 member nations.

== Members ==
- Argentina
- Brazil
- Canada
- Cayman Islands
- Chile
- Colombia
- Cuba
- El Salvador
- Guatemala
- Haiti
- Honduras
- Jamaica
- Mexico
- Nicaragua
- Panama
- Puerto Rico
- United States
- U.S. Virgin Islands
- Uruguay

== Competitions ==
American Football competitions

- Central American Bowl (men)
- North American Youth Championship (men)

Flag Football competitions

- Americas Continental Flag Football Championship (men and women)
- South American Flag Football Championship (men and women)
- Central American and Caribbean Flag Football Championship (men and women)
- Americas Youth Flag Football Championships (boys and girls)

== See also ==
- International Federation of American Football (IFAF)
