= 2018 World University American Football Championship =

Tournament details
- Host nation: China
- Dates: June 14 – June 24
- No. of nations: 5

Final positions
- Champions: Mexico
- Runner-up: United States
- Third-place: Japan

The 2018 World University American Football Championship was an international college American football tournament that was held from June 16 to 24, 2018 in Harbin, China, at Harbin University of Commerce Stadium. It was the third World University Championship for American football. The tournament was held in round-robin format, with each team facing each other once.

== Teams ==
- United States
- Mexico
- Japan
- China
- South Korea

== Final standings ==
Rk	Team	W	L
1st place, gold medalist(s)	Mexico	4	0
2nd place, silver medalist(s)	United States	2	1
3rd place, bronze medalist(s)	Japan	2	2
4	South Korea	1	3
5	China	0	4

== Matches ==
Match results
Date	Home team	Guest team	Score
June 14, 13:00	USA	CHN	69-0
June 14, 17:00	JPN	KOR	32-0
June 16, 13:00	MEX	KOR	69-0
June 16, 17:00	JPN	CHN	70-0
June 19, 13:00	JPN	USA	3:42
June 19, 17:00	MEX	CHN	70:0
June 21, 13:00	CHN	KOR	0:42
June 21, 17:00	MEX	USA	20:17
June 24, 13:00	USA	KOR	69:0
June 24, 17:00	MEX	JPN	39:3
