= Yoshinobu Imoto =

American football player (born 1975)

No. 7
- Position: Wide receiver

Personal information
- Born: November 17, 1975 (age 50)
- Listed height: 6 ft 0 in (1.83 m)
- Listed weight: 185 lb (84 kg)

Career information
- College: Ritsumeikan

Career history
- Amsterdam Admirals (2003); New York Jets (2003)*
- * Offseason or practice squad member only

Yoshinobu "Yoshi" Imoto (born November 17, 1975) is a Japanese former professional American football wide receiver who played for the Amsterdam Admirals of NFL Europe and for the New York Jets during the 2003 NFL preseason. He played college football at Ritsumeikan University.

== Early life ==
Yoshinobu Imoto was born on November 17, 1975. He played college football at Ritsumeikan University for the Panthers.

== Professional career ==
Imoto played in two games for the Amsterdam Admirals during the 2003 NFL Europe season as a reserve wide receiver, posting one special teams tackle. In July 2003, during training camp, the NFL assigned Imoto to the New York Jets, several weeks ahead of the American Bowl preseason game in Japan on August 2 between the Jets and Tampa Bay Buccaneers. The Buccaneers were likewise assigned Imoto's former Admirals teammate, Japanese linebacker Shinzo Yamada. At the time Imoto joined the Jets, he had been playing football for 11 years. His first practice with the Jets was on July 21, 2003. He was reportedly paid $106 a day by the NFL. Imoto did not know English and had to use a translator. Jets head coach Herm Edwards said that Imoto would catch a pass during the American Bowl, stating "I don't know how much time he's going to get, but he'll get the ball. Some kind of way, he's going to have at least one reception." By July 27, Imoto had caught at least two passes during practice. Jets quarterback Chad Pennington said "I haven't been in there when he's been in there, but just call a regular play and he goes. I remember one time he even lined up in the right place, and a coach was trying to tell him to go the other way. He was in the right place to start with, so it's pretty amazing how much he has picked up." Before the American Bowl, Edwards said the Jets had three plays drawn up for Imoto. During the game, Imoto ended up catching one pass for 44 yards late in the fourth quarter. His contract ended after the game, and he returned to his job in Tokyo working for a clothing manufacturer.
