= Helmut-Schön-Sportpark =

American football stadium in Germany

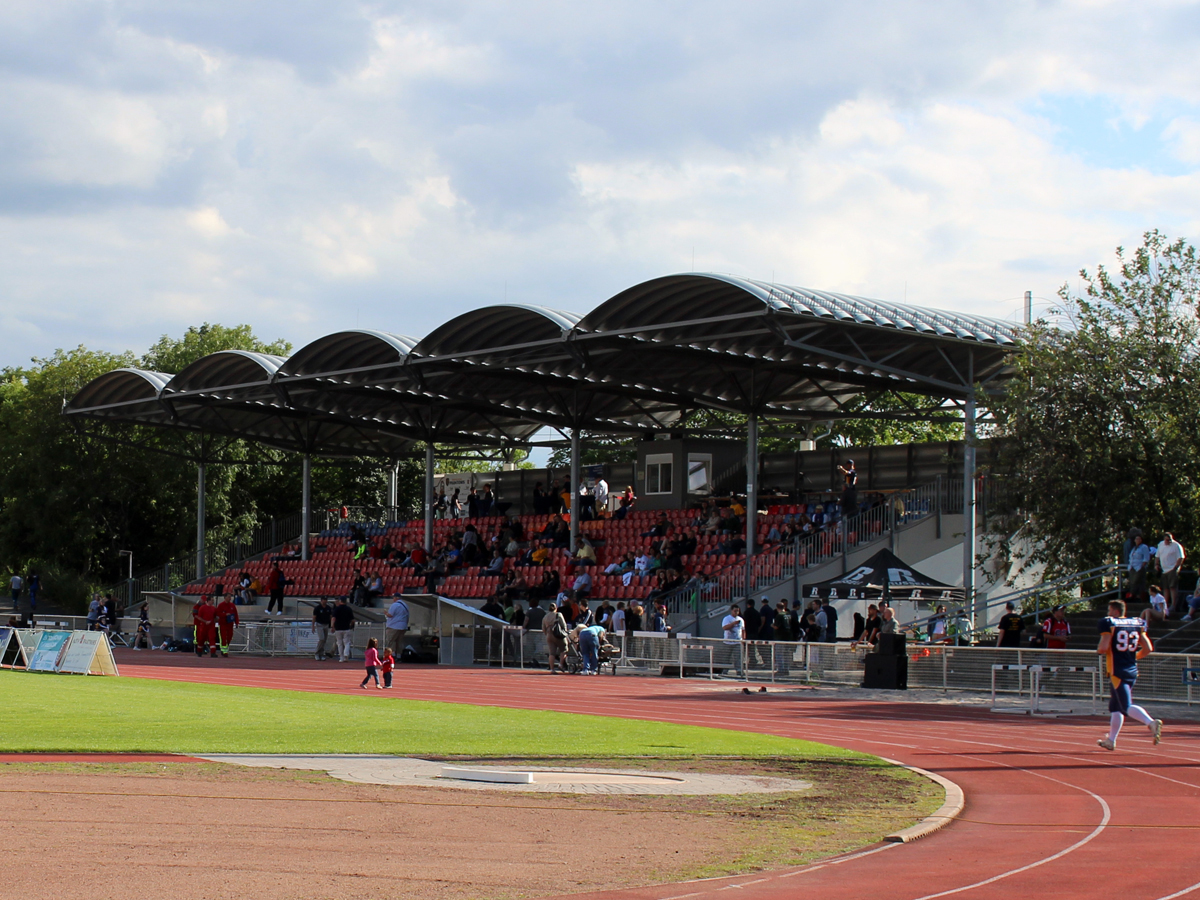
- Interactive map of Helmut-Schön-Sportpark
- Full name: Helmut-Schön-Sportpark
- Location: Wettinerstraße 4, Wiesbaden, Germany
- Coordinates: 50°04′11″N 8°15′26″E
- Owner: City of Wiesbaden
- Capacity: 11,000
- Surface: Lawn

Construction
- Opened: 1907
- Renovated: 2008

Tenants
- SV Wiesbaden (1907- ) Wiesbaden Phantoms (2011- )

The Helmut-Schön-Sportpark is an American football stadium for the Wiesbaden Phantoms American football team in Wiesbaden, Germany. It was built in 1907. Capacity of the venue is 11,498 people. It was used as a venue for the 2003 IFAF World Cup. Before 2009, it was called Stadion an der Berliner Straße.

Further the association football team SV Wiesbaden 1899 also play at this stadium.
