= Australia national American football team =

Australia
- Name: Australia
- Founded: 1996
- Head coach: Peter Breuer

First international
- Australia 6–22 Sweden (Palermo, Italy; 25 June 1999)

Biggest win
- Australia 47–6 South Korea (Canton, Ohio, United States; 9 July 2015)

Biggest defeat
- Australia 0–65 Mexico (Innsbruck, Austria; 10 July 2011)

The Australia national American football team represent Australia in international American football (gridiron) competitions. The team is organised by Gridiron Australia, the national governing body for the sport.

== History ==
Organised gridiron football in Australia began in 1983. The national governing body, American Football Australia, was formed in 1996. Australia is a charter member of the International Federation of American Football (IFAF) and competed in the inaugural 1999 IFAF World Championship. They have since competed in the Oceania Bowl in 2005 and the Samoa Bowl in 2011, among other international competitions. Australia has been competing in the IFAF World Championship since 2011.

Australia restarted international competition in 2025, with an IFAF recognised friendly at home to New Zealand on 12 July 2025 with a 20-14 win. and repeat another friendly in 2026 with a 36-33 lost to New Zealand.

== IFAF World Championship record ==
Year	Position	GP	W	L	PF	PA
(Italy) 1999	5th	3	1	2	16	83
(Germany) 2003	Did not participate					
(Japan) 2007	Did not participate					
(Austria) 2011	8th	4	0	4	30	204
(United States) 2015	5th	4	3	1	108	81

The 2019 IFAF World Championship was to be held in Australia. It was first postponed to 2023 and moved to Germany, before being postponed again to 2025.
