= World University American Football Championship =

- Sport: American football
- Founded: 2014
- Organizing body: FISU / IFAF
- No. of teams: 5
- Most recent champion: Mexico (3rd title)
- Most titles: Mexico (3)

The World University American Football Championship is an international college American football competition sponsored and organized by the International University Sports Federation (FISU) and the International Federation of American Football (IFAF).

The first World University American Football Championship was held from May 1-11, 2014 in Uppsala, Sweden and the last edition was held from June 16-24, 2018 in Harbin, China.

The 2020 and 2022 championships were cancelled due to the COVID-19 pandemic. From 2022, the championship changed formats, with university teams participating rather than national teams.

== Results ==
The tournament was held with a round-robin format, the national team with the most wins was crowned champions.

Year	Host	Championship game			Third-place game
Year	Host	Winner	Runner-up	3rd place	4th place
2014; Details	Uppsala, Sweden	Mexico	Japan	Sweden	Finland
2016; Details	Monterrey, Mexico	Mexico	United States	Japan	China
2018; Details	Harbin, China	Mexico	United States	Japan	South Korea
