= Herbert Dröse Stadium =

Football stadium in Hanau, Germany

Coordinates: 50°08′34″N 8°52′59″E

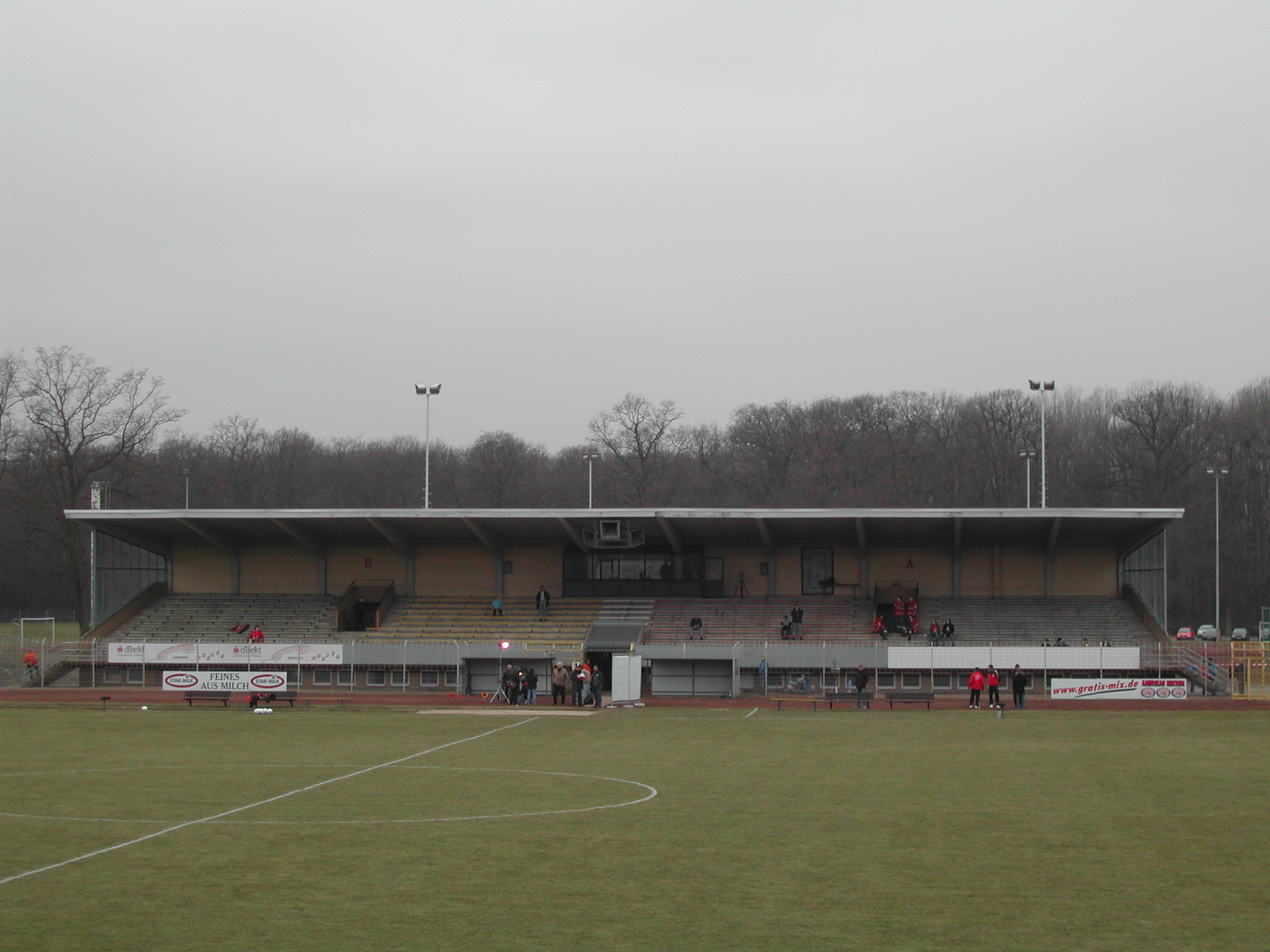
Main stand

The Herbert Dröse Stadium (German: Herbert-Dröse-Stadion) is a sports facility in Hanau-Wilhelmsbad in Hesse, Germany, which opened in 1951. It is the home stadium for the Hanau Hornets American football team, with a capacity of 16,000.

It was used as a venue for the 2003 IFAF World Cup.
