= Anthony Dablé =

American football player (born 1988)

Anthony Dablé-Wolf
Profile
- Position: Wide receiver

Personal information
- Born: September 25, 1988 (age 38)
- Listed height: 6 ft 4 in (1.93 m)
- Listed weight: 220 lb (100 kg)

Career information
- NFL draft: 2016: undrafted

Career history
- Centaurs Grenoble (2007–2012); Lübeck Cougars (2013)*; Berlin Rebels (2013); New Yorker Lions (2014–2015); Aix-en-Provence Argonautes (2016)*; New York Giants (2016)*; Atlanta Falcons (2017)*; New Yorker Lions (2018); Hildesheim Invaders (2019); Leipzig Kings (2021–2022)
- * Offseason or practice squad member only

Awards and highlights
- 2× German Bowl champion (XXXVI, XXXVII); Eurobowl champion (XXIX)
- Stats at Pro Football Reference

Anthony Dablé-Wolf (born Anthony Dablé; September 25, 1988) is a French professional American football wide receiver and coach. He has also played for the Aix-en-Provence Argonautes of the French Ligue Élite de Football Américain (LEFA), the France national team, the Lübeck Cougars, the Berlin Rebels, and the New Yorker Lions, before becoming the first player signed to the NFL from the International Player Pathway Program. After stints with the New York Giants and the Atlanta Falcons, he returned to Europe, where he played for GFL teams New Yorker Lions and Hildesheim Invaders and for the Leipzig Kings of the newly formed European League of Football (ELF).

== Early life ==
After discovering American football at the age of 17 by playing the video game NFL Quarterback Club for the Nintendo 64, Dablé learned the sport by watching videos of wide receivers of his size on YouTube. He then tried out for, and joined, the Grenoble Centaures at the age of 19.

== Career ==
=== France ===
He started playing football with the Grenoble Centaures in U-19 team in 2007 . While with the Centaures he won the Vice champion French Football Championship Division 2 in 2010, the France Championship Football Division 1 (Élite) in 2011 and the European Federation of American Football Cup in 2012.

He also played for the France National Team four times, in 2010, 2011, 2014 and 2015. In 2010, the team won the silver medal, losing to Germany in the EFAF European Championship. In 2011, the team placed sixth in the IFAF World Championship. In 2014, the team won the bronze medal in the EFAF European Championship. In 2015, the team placed fourth in the IFAF World Championship.

=== Canada ===
In 2012, Dablé went to the Université Laval in Canada but was not eligible to play there.

== Professional career ==
=== German Football League ===
==== Berlin Rebels ====
Dablé joined his teammate from the France national team, Giovanni Nanguy, to play for the Lübeck Cougars, but finished the season with the Berlin Rebels. During his time with the Rebels, Dablé wore number 80. He played in six games, recorded 26 receptions for 654 yards (average of 25.2 yards per catch), scored eight touchdowns (the longest being an 83-yard catch) and nine kick returns for 237 return yards (longest kick return 55 yards). He also returned seven punts for 71 yards (longest punt return 43 yards).

==== New Yorker Lions ====
He played two seasons for the New Yorker Lions, winning the German Bowl twice (2014 and 2015), the Vice European Championship and Eurobowl during his last season.

==== Career statistics ====
GFL statistics
Season				Receiving						Kick returns					Fumbles	
Year	Team	GP	GS	Tgt	Rec	Yards	Avg	TD	Long	Ret	Yards	Avg	Long	TD	Fum	Lost
2014	NYL	--	--	--	70	1,186	16.9	17	74	9	267	29.7	73	0	--	--
2015	NYL	--	--	--	75	1,251	16.7	15	89	13	389	29.9	41	0	--	--
Career		--	--	--	145	2,437	16.8	32	89	22	656	29.8	73	0	--	--

=== National Football League ===
==== New York Giants ====
After posting his highlights on YouTube, Dablé was spotted by former New York Giant player Osi Umenyiora. After successful tests in England he moved to Florida on January 28, 2016, to train for the NFL Combine Regional in Minnesota. He signed a multi-year contract after a tryout on February 17, 2016. On September 3, 2016, he was released by the Giants as part of the final roster cuts.

==== Atlanta Falcons ====
On January 5, 2017, Dablé signed a reserve/future contract with the Atlanta Falcons. He was waived on September 1, 2017.

=== German Football League ===
==== New Yorker Lions (second stint) ====
Dablé-Wolf returned to the GFL by signing with the New Yorker Lions on May 23, 2018.

==== Hildesheim Invaders ====
In December 2018 the Hildesheim Invaders signed Dablé-Wolf for the 2019 season.

=== European League of Football ===
==== German Knights 1367/Leipzig Kings ====
In February 2021, it was announced that new franchise German Knights 1367, out of the newly formed European League of Football, has signed Dablé-Wolf for the 2021 season. After that team did not join the league for its inaugural season, he was instead transferred to the Leipzig Kings. On April 14, 2022, his extension was announced after being signed by the Allgäu Comets for their 2022 season.

== Personal life ==
He is multilingual, speaking French, English and German.
