= 2016 World University American Football Championship =

Tournament details
- Host nation: Mexico
- Dates: June 1 – June 11
- No. of nations: 5

Final positions
- Champions: Mexico
- Runner-up: United States
- Third-place: Japan

The 2016 World University American Football Championship was an international college American football tournament that was held from June 1 to 11, 2016 in Monterrey, Mexico, at Estadio Tecnológico. It was the second World University Championship for team American football. The tournament was held in round-robin format, with each team facing each other once.

Mexico repeated as champions as they defeated the United States 35–7 in the final, with Mexico quarterback Francisco Mata Charles earning championship game MVP honors.

== Teams ==
- United States
- Mexico
- Japan
- China
- Guatemala
- India (did not attend)

Note: India did not attend due to visa issues.

The Mexican team was made up of 61 players from the top two college football leagues in the country (ONEFA and CONADEIP), with the exception of Pumas CU players, who were withheld by their university for academic reasons.

== Final standings ==
| Rk | Team | W | L | PF | PA |
|---|---|---|---|---|---|
| 1st place, gold medalist(s) | Mexico | 4 | 0 | 208 | 10 |
| 2nd place, silver medalist(s) | United States | 3 | 1 | 145 | 49 |
| 3rd place, bronze medalist(s) | Japan | 2 | 2 | 161 | 58 |
| 4 | China | 1 | 3 | 3 | 201 |
| 5 | Guatemala | 0 | 4 | 0 | 199 |

== Matches ==
Game 1

| Quarter | 1 | 2 | 3 | 4 | Total |
|---|---|---|---|---|---|
| Japan | 37 | 14 | 13 | 8 | 72 |
| Guatemala | 0 | 0 | 0 | 0 | 0 |

- Date: Jun 2, 2016
- Game time: 14:00

Game 2

| Quarter | 1 | 2 | 3 | 4 | Total |
|---|---|---|---|---|---|
| China | 0 | 0 | 0 | 0 | 0 |
| Mexico | 40 | 20 | 7 | 7 | 74 |

- Date: Jun 2, 2016
- Game time: 18:00

Game 3

| Quarter | 1 | 2 | 3 | 4 | Total |
|---|---|---|---|---|---|
| United States | 21 | 13 | 14 | 7 | 55 |
| China | 0 | 0 | 0 | 0 | 0 |

- Date: Jun 4, 2016
- Game time: 18:00

Game 4

| Quarter | 1 | 2 | 3 | 4 | Total |
|---|---|---|---|---|---|
| Guatemala | 0 | 0 | 0 | 0 | 0 |
| Mexico | 21 | 14 | 14 | 14 | 63 |

- Date: Jun 5, 2016
- Game time: 18:00

Game 5

| Quarter | 1 | 2 | 3 | 4 | Total |
|---|---|---|---|---|---|
| Japan | 7 | 0 | 0 | 7 | 14 |
| United States | 7 | 6 | 0 | 9 | 22 |

- Date: Jun 6, 2016
- Game time: 18:00

Game 6

| Quarter | 1 | 2 | 3 | 4 | Total |
|---|---|---|---|---|---|
| Guatemala | 0 | 0 | 0 | 0 | 0 |
| China | 0 | 0 | 0 | 3 | 3 |

- Date: Jun 7, 2016
- Game time: 14:00

Game 7

| Quarter | 1 | 2 | 3 | 4 | Total |
|---|---|---|---|---|---|
| Mexico | 14 | 0 | 7 | 15 | 36 |
| Japan | 0 | 3 | 0 | 0 | 3 |

- Date: Jun 8, 2016
- Game time: 18:00

Game 8

| Quarter | 1 | 2 | 3 | 4 | Total |
|---|---|---|---|---|---|
| United States | 48 | 0 | 7 | 6 | 61 |
| Guatemala | 0 | 0 | 0 | 0 | 0 |

- Date: Jun 9, 2016
- Game time: 18:00

Game 9

| Quarter | 1 | 2 | 3 | 4 | Total |
|---|---|---|---|---|---|
| Japan | 35 | 16 | 13 | 8 | 72 |
| China | 0 | 0 | 0 | 0 | 0 |

- Date: Jun 10, 2016
- Game time: 18:00

Game 10

| Quarter | 1 | 2 | 3 | 4 | Total |
|---|---|---|---|---|---|
| Mexico | 7 | 14 | 14 | 0 | 35 |
| United States | 7 | 0 | 0 | 0 | 7 |

- Date: Jun 11, 2016
- Game time: 18:00
