= Mexico national American football team =

Mexico
- Nickname: El Tri
- Federation: Federación Mexicana de Fútbol Americano (FMFA)
- Confederation: IFAF Americas
- Region: North America
- Colors: Green, white & red
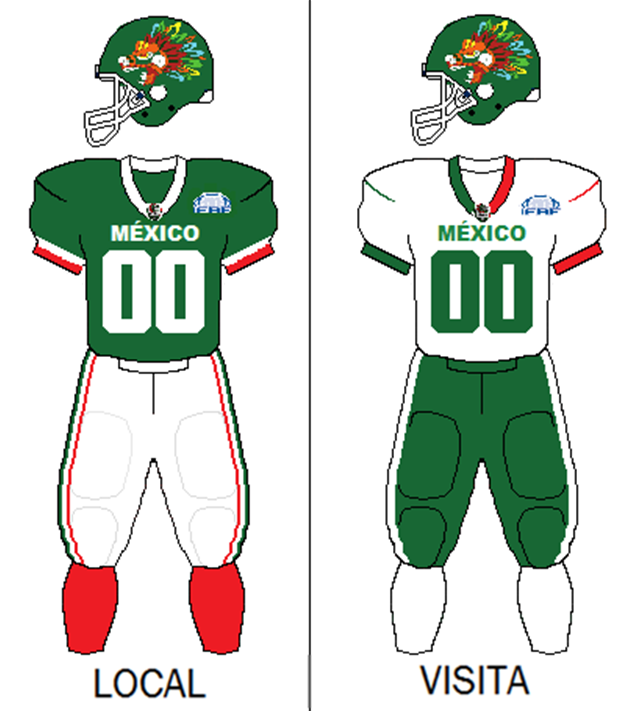
- Uniforms
- Head coach: Raul Rivera Sanchez

First international
- Mexico 89–0 Finland (Palermo, Italy; 27 June 1999)

Biggest win
- Mexico 89–0 Finland (Palermo, Italy; 27 June 1999)

Biggest defeat
- Mexico 6–30 United States (Canton, Ohio, United States; 9 July 2015)

IFAF World Championship of American Football
- Appearances: 4 (first in 1999)
- Best result: Runner-up (1999, 2003)

World University American Football Championship
- Appearances: 3 (first in 2014)
- Best result: Champions (2014, 2016, 2018)

Mexico national American football team
Medal record

Men's American football

Representing Mexico

IFAF World Championship
Silver medal – second place	1999 Italy	Team
Silver medal – second place	2003 Germany	Team
Bronze medal – third place	2015 United States	Team

World University Championship
Gold medal – first place	2014 Sweden	Team
Gold medal – first place	2016 Mexico	Team
Gold medal – first place	2018 China	Team

The Mexico national American football team (Spanish: Selección de fútbol americano de México) represents Mexico in international American football competitions. The team is controlled by the Federación Mexicana de Fútbol Americano (FMFA). Mexico has participated in competitions such as the IFAF World Championship and the World University American Football Championship. The Mexican junior team has participated in competitions such as the IFAF Junior World Championship and the NFL Global Junior Championship.

Mexico finished second place in both the 1999 and 2003 IFAF World Championship, losing both times to Japan. They did not participate in 2007 but returned to competition in the 2011 Championship. They returned to the podium at the 2015 IFAF World Championship, where they won a bronze medal.

Mexico also won the World University American Football Championship three times (2014, 2016 and 2018).

The selected players are usually from teams in ONEFA, Mexico's main college football league.

== Tournament history ==
=== IFAF World Championship of American Football ===
Year	Position	GP	W	L	PF	PA
(Italy) 1999	2nd	3	2	1	143	6
(Germany) 2003	2nd	2	1	1	35	51
(Japan) 2007	Did not participate					
(Austria) 2011	4th	4	2	2	108	49
(United States) 2015	3rd	3	1	2	33	72
2025	TBD					

=== World University American Football Championship ===
- 2014: Champions
- 2016: Champions
- 2018: Champions

=== Junior national team ===
==== NFL Global Junior Championship ====
- 1997: Champions
- 1998: Champions
- 1999: Silver
- 2003: Bronze
- 2004: Bronze
- 2005: Bronze
- 2007: Bronze

Mexico's junior team competed in the 2009 IFAF Junior World Championship in Canton, Ohio from 27 June to 5 July.

=== IFAF U-20 World Championship ===
- 2009: 4th
- 2012: Did not participate
- 2014: Bronze
- 2016: Bronce
- 2018: Silver
- 2024: Did not participate

== See also ==
- Liga de Fútbol Americano Profesional
- ONEFA
- CONADEIP
