= 2015 IFAF World Championship =

American football tournament

Tournament details
- Host nation: United States
- Dates: July 9 – July 18
- No. of nations: 7

Final positions
- Champions: United States (3rd title)
- Runner-up: Japan
- Third-place: Mexico

Tournament statistics
- Attendance: 5,750
- MVP of the tournament: (United States) Trent Steelman

The 2015 IFAF World Championship was the fifth instance of the IFAF World Championship, an international American football tournament. The United States hosted the tournament. Seven teams had confirmed their participation for the tournament in Canton, Ohio.

The tournament was to be hosted by Stockholm, Sweden, with all games to be take place at the Tele2 Arena, but in December 2014, it was canceled after the host failed to set up a sponsorship structure. Instead, USA Football hosted the tournament at the Tom Benson Hall of Fame Stadium in Canton.

The United States won their third consecutive championship in their third appearance, defeating Japan 59–12 in the final. Sports Radio America internationally broadcast the gold medal game.

== Background ==
The 2015 World Championships in Sweden were originally scheduled to be the first ever to consist of a field of 12 national teams in World Championships. The teams were to be divided into four groups for the preliminary round. In December 2014, the local organizing committee revealed that the tournament was canceled after the host failed to set up a sponsorship structure. USA Football later took over organizational duties to host the tournament at Tom Benson Hall of Fame Stadium in Canton. Both the German and Austrian teams did not attend, raising the challenge of the increased financial costs of traveling to the U.S. and also questioning the choice of Canton for hosting it, due to the lack of facilities to accommodate a large number of teams.

The schedule in Canton originally had five rounds, with teams divided into two brackets of four teams each. The teams were seeded based on their IFAF rankings. The preliminary rounds consisted of each team playing three games: one against every other team in their bracket. The top three finishers in the higher bracket (USA, Canada, Japan, and Mexico) and the lone top finisher in the lower bracket would advance to the semifinals.

Team Canada, the defending silver medalists, withdrew from the tournament due to difficulties with sponsorship, budgeting and scheduling.

Originally 8 teams for this edition, the final schedule included 7 teams playing 4 rounds with three games each day on July 9, 12, 15, and 18. #3 seed Japan received a bye in Round 1, while #4 seed Mexico drew a bye in Round 2 after losing in the first round against Team USA.

== Qualifying ==
Teams with an asterisk did not attend.

Confederation	Qualifying event	Date	Venue	Vacancies	Qualified
Europe	Host nation	12 October 2011		4	Sweden*
Europe	2014 European Championships	3 June 2014	Austria	4	Germany*
Europe	2014 European Championships	4 June 2014	Austria	4	Austria*
Europe	2014 European Championships	7 June 2014	Austria	4	France
Americas	2011 IFAF World Championship	16 July 2011	United States	4	United States
Americas	2011 IFAF World Championship	16 July 2011	United States	4	Canada*
Americas	2011 IFAF World Championship	16 July 2011	United States	4	Mexico
Americas	American Qualifier Game (Panama vs Brazil)	31 January 2015	Panama	4	Brazil
Asia	Asian Qualifier Game (Korea vs Kuwait)	12 April 2014	South Korea	2	South Korea
Asia	Asian Qualifier Game (Japan vs Philippines)	26 April 2014	Japan	2	Japan
Oceania	Oceanian Qualifier	3 December 2013		1	Australia
Africa	African Qualifier Game (Egypt vs Morocco)	13 December 2014	Egypt	1	Morocco*
Total				12	

=== Notes ===
This was the fifth IFAF World Championship tournament for Japanese defensive lineman Yasuo Wakisaka, 46. He is the only player to appear in all world championship tournaments since its inception in 1999.

== Venue ==
All games of the tournament were played at Tom Benson Hall of Fame Stadium in Canton, Ohio.

All Games	2015 IFAF World Championship is located in the United States
Canton, OH	2015 IFAF World Championship is located in the United States
Tom Benson Hall of Fame Stadium; Capacity: 22,375	2015 IFAF World Championship is located in the United States

== Bracket ==
=== Group A ===
In the revised schedule, best 3 teams of Group A would advance to 1st-4th playoffs, while the bottom team would be relegated to 5th-8th playoffs. Since Canada (originally seed #2) withdrew from the tournament after the revised schedule was announced, their spot was left vacated, giving byes to Japan for Round 1, the loser between United States and Mexico for Round 2, and the Group B 4th place for 5th-8th playoffs semifinal.

First round
1	United States	30
3	Mexico	6
2	Japan
Canada	WD

Second round
1	United States	43
2	Japan	18
Third place
3	Mexico
bye

=== Group B ===
1st place of Group B would be promoted to 1st-4th playoffs, while the rest would advance to 5th-8th playoffs.

First round
4	France	31
7	Brazil	6
5	Australia	47
6	South Korea	6

Second round
4	France	53
5	Australia	3
Consolation quarter-final
7	Brazil	28
6	South Korea	0

=== Consolation Round ===
Consolation semi-finals
A4	bye
B4	South Korea
B2	Australia	16
B3	Brazil	8

5th place match
South Korea	14
Australia	42
7th place match
Brazil
bye

=== Championship Round ===
Semi-finals
A1	United States	82
B1	France	0
A2	Japan	35
A3	Mexico	7

Final
United States	59
Japan	12
3rd place match
France	7
Mexico	20

== Matches ==
=== Round 1 ===
Game 1

Quarter	1	2	3	4	Total
South Korea	6	0	0	0	6
Australia	0	24	16	7	47

at Tom Benson Hall of Fame Stadium, Canton, Ohio, United States

- Date: July 9, 2015
- Game time: 12:00
- Game weather: Temp: 75 Wind: 21mph SW Weather: overcast/rain
- Game attendance: 250
- Referee: Officials: Ref: Hiroyasu (JAP) Ump: Sampaio (BRA) Line: Harangi (HUN) LJ: Rosa (BRA) BJ: Barinaga (USA) FJ: Rasmussen *DEN) SJ: Cardenas (CHI) CJ: Matos (MEX)

Team	1	2	Total
{{{Visitor}}}	{{{V1}}}	{{{V2}}}	0
{{{Host}}}	{{{H1}}}	{{{H2}}}	0

Scoring summary
1	9:37	South Korea	Interception return	South Korea 6–0
2	11:06	Australia	3 yard run	Australia 7–6
2	10:02	Australia		Australia 14–6
2	4:58	Australia		Australia 21–6
2	0:00	Australia	Field Goal	Australia 24–6
3	10:14	Australia		Australia 31–6
3	5:00	Australia		Australia 38–6
3	0:10	Australia	Safety	Australia 40–6
4	9:00	Australia		Australia 47–6

South Korea took an early lead in the first quarter when Bong Do Yeo returned an interception 36 yards for a touchdown. Australia's Jared Stegman was picked off again later in the quarter by Jun Keun Hwang, but South Korea was unable to capitalize off the turnover. Australia responded with 47 unanswered points, including a safety in the third quarter, to win 47–6. Stegman threw for 133 yards and four touchdowns and Conor Foley ran for 132 yards and a touchdown. Australia's offense finished with 385 total yards, including 247 yards rushing. Meanwhile, their defense held South Korea to just 69 total yards, including minus-21 yards rushing. Australia snapped a four-game losing streak in the IFAF World Championship tournament dating back to 1999. 39-year-old right tackle Jason Aslimoski was the only remaining player from the 1999 team.

Game 2

Quarter	1	2	3	4	Total
Brazil	0	0	0	6	6
France	21	3	0	7	31

at Tom Benson Hall of Fame Stadium, Canton, Ohio, United States

- Date: July 9, 2015
- Game time: 15:30
- Game weather: rain
- Game attendance: 200
- Referee: Officials: Ref: Briggs (GB) Ump: Parsons (GB) Line: Lamminsalo (FIN) LJ: Udvardi (HUN) BJ: Walentynowicz (POL) FJ: Mickkelsen (DEN) SJ: Batzler (SWE) CJ: Veronica (MEX)

Team	1	2	Total
{{{Visitor}}}	{{{V1}}}	{{{V2}}}	0
{{{Host}}}	{{{H1}}}	{{{H2}}}	0

Scoring summary
1	11:47	France	8 Anthony Dable – 102 yard Kick-off return TD	France 7–0
1	7:37	France	12 Paul Durand to 11 Guillaume Rioux – 38 yard pass TD	France 14–0
1	0:55	France	12 Paul Durand to 11 Guillaume Rioux – 5 yard pass TD	France 21–0
2	10:10	France	10 Alexandre Sy – 20 yard Field Goal	France 24–0
4	5:46	Brazil	1 Rhudson Fonsecsa – 2 yard run TD	France 24–6
4	0:49	France	23 Stephen Yepmo – 53 yard run TD	France 31–6

France scored 13 seconds into the game, with a tournament-record 102-yard kickoff return for a touchdown by Anthony Dablé. Quarterback Paul Durand connected with Guillaume Rioux for two touchdowns to put France up 21–0 by the end of the first quarter. Durand was 11-of-19 passing for 136 yards with no interceptions, while Rioux hauled in four passes for 58 yards. Brazil scored their first ever IFAF tournament points when Rhudson Fonsecsa scored on a run from 2 yards out. Brazil tried for two, but was unsuccessful. France finished off the scoring with a 53-yard touchdown run by Stephan Yepmo with under a minute left. He finished with 109 yards on 13 carries.

Game 3

Quarter	1	2	3	4	Total
Mexico	0	3	0	3	6
United States	3	7	13	7	30

at Tom Benson Hall of Fame Stadium, Canton, Ohio, United States

- Date: July 9, 2015
- Game time: 19:00
- Game weather: cloudy
- Game attendance: 350
- Referee: Officials: Ref: Takakura (JAP) Ump: Leoniak (POL) Line: Dove (AUS) LJ: Ledo (SWE) BJ: Mercer (AUS) FJ: Canto (FRA) SJ: Shin (SKR) CJ: Sinclair (AUS)

The U.S. dominated defensively from the beginning, holding Mexico to minus-6 yards on the ground and 93 through the air. They were led in part by two former Mount Union players: quarterback Kevin Burke and Luc Meacham. The two connected on a 12-yard touchdown pass to cap a 17-play drive and give the U.S. a 10–0 lead in the second quarter. Mexico answered with a field goal before halftime. In the third quarter, Team USA scored on two of its first three possessions to take command of the game. Former Texas Tech running back Sadale Foster scored on a five-yard run and Aaron Wimberly (Iowa State) added a one-yard touchdown run. Burke was the game MVP after completing 18-of-25 passes for a touchdown and two interceptions before backup Dylan Favre (nephew of Brett Favre) saw some playing time. Meacham grabbed four passes for 37 yards and the touchdown. Mexico finished with 87 yards of total offense; their quarterback Isaias Vega completed 11-of-19 passes for 46 yards.

=== Round 2 ===
Game 4

Quarter	1	2	3	4	Total
South Korea	0	0	0	0	0
Brazil	0	12	13	3	28

at Tom Benson Hall of Fame Stadium, Canton, Ohio, United States

- Date: July 12, 2015
- Game time: 12:00
- Game weather: rain
- Game attendance: 100
- Referee: Rana Hiroyasu

In their second game in tournament history, Brazil defeated South Korea 28–0 for their first victory. Brazil dominated from whistle to whistle. Bruno Santucci led all rushers with 108 yards on 8 carries while Romulo Ramus ran for 93 yards on 10 carries. Quarterback Rodrigo Dantas completed 8 of 18 for 84 yards and two touchdowns while Rhudson Fonseca passed for 45 yards and a touchdown. Rodrigo Pons had 5 catches for 60 yards and two touchdowns while Heron Azevedo made three catches for 38 yards and one touchdown. The play that swung things around came after Brazil's only turnover. Trailing 18–0 midway through the third quarter, South Korea had the ball on Brazil's 38. Marcos da Rocha intercepted a pass from Hoon Kim, allowing Pons to score the second of his two touchdowns on the next play. South Korea advanced to the fifth place match and Brazil advanced to a match against Australia for the right to face South Korea in the fifth place match.

Game 5

Quarter	1	2	3	4	Total
Australia	0	3	0	0	3
France	10	23	0	20	53

at Tom Benson Hall of Fame Stadium, Canton, Ohio, United States

- Date: July 12, 2015
- Game time: 15:30
- Game weather: rain
- Game attendance: 100
- Referee: Einar Bolstad

Team	1	2	Total
{{{Visitor}}}	{{{V1}}}	{{{V2}}}	0
{{{Host}}}	{{{H1}}}	{{{H2}}}	0

Scoring summary
1	9:52	France	12 Paul Durand to 44 Kévin Mwamba 4 yard pass TD	France 7–0
1	3:19	France	10 Alexandre Sy – 37 yard Field Goal	France 10–0
2	11:51	France	23 Stephen Yepmo – 41 yard run TD	France 17–0
2	6:15	Australia	29 yard Field Goal	France 17–3
2	6:01	France	8 Anthony Dable – 92 yard Kick-off return TD	France 24–3
2	5:49	France	76 Willy N'Kishi – Safety	France 26–3
2	3:23	France	23 Stephen Yepmo – 1 yard run TD	France 33–3
4	9:50	France	18 Nicolas Khandar – 89 yard run TD	France 40–3
4	6:38	France	18 Nicolas Khandar – 1 yard run TD	France 46–3
4	3:24	France	2 Perez Mattison to 5 Rémi Bertellin – 6 yard pass TD	France 53–3

France beat Australia 53–3 for its second win in a row. Anthoney Dablé returned the opening kickoff 66 yards, allowing quarterback Paul Durand to throw a 4 yard touchdown pass to Kevin Mwamba a few plays later. Yepmo had a big game, scoring twice in the second quarter, including a 42-yard run that put France up 17–0. Yepmo finished with 13 carries for 111 yards. After a field goal by Australia, Dablé returned a kickoff for a touchdown for the second game in a row, a 92 yards run that increased the France lead to 24–3. Khandar's 88 yard run in the fourth quarter set an IFAF tournament record for longest touchdown run in a game. Perez Mattison finished out the scoring with a 6-yard pass to Rémi Bertellin.

Game 6

Quarter	1	2	3	4	Total
United States	8	3	14	18	43
Japan	0	3	7	8	18

at Tom Benson Hall of Fame Stadium, Canton, Ohio, United States

- Date: July 12, 2015
- Game time: 19:00
- Game weather: cloudy
- Game attendance: 500
- Referee: Jim Briggs

In a rematch of the 2007 World Championship final, Team USA quarterbacks Kevin Burke and Favre each threw an interception in the first half. Additionally, Japan blocked a 29-yard field goal attempt by Ed Ruhnke when Keizaburo Isagawa snuck through the line. After a low-scoring first half, the U.S. broke things open in the second half. Their running back, Sadale Foster, scored 2 touchdowns on the day, one of which was for 60 yards, a new Team USA record. Foster was awarded game MVP after rushing for 84 yards on 12 carries. The United States posted 580 yards of total offense. Favre was 15-of-19 for 193 yards, while Burke was 8-of-16 for 160 yards with a touchdown. Meanwhilie, Japan team MVP Shohei Kato completed 28 of 49 passes for 273 yards and a touchdown.

=== Round 3 ===
Game 7

Quarter	1	2	3	4	Total
Australia	16	0	0	0	16
Brazil	0	0	0	8	8

at Tom Benson Hall of Fame Stadium, Canton, Ohio, United States

- Date: July 15, 2015
- Game time: 12:00
- Game weather: overcast
- Game attendance: 150
- Referee: J.Briggs • Umpire: D.Parsons • Linesman: J.P Cantos • Line judge: G.Udvardi • Back judge: Walentynowicz • Field judge: D.Cardenas • Side judge: I.Kim • Alternate: M.Matos •

Australia got on top early, ultimately gaining a lead it never gave up as a 58-yard touchdown pass from Jared Stegman (11-of-16, 140 yards, touchdown) to Matt Riles opened the scoring. Fullback Nate Lansdel went in from 4 yards out two drives later and put Brazil down 16 after the first quarter. Australia had outgained Brazil in total offense 134–8. Despite the start, Brazil closed within a score when Felipe Leiria caught a 10-yard touchdown pass from Rodrigo Dantas (11-of-21, 126 yards) and Breno Tkashashi converted the two-point conversion with 3:06 remaining. Brazil was able to get the ball back after a three-and-out by Australia, but an interception by Damien Donaldson with 58 seconds doomed any hopes of a Brazil comeback. Notably, Ramos caught 7 passes for 101 yards for Brazil.

Game 8

Quarter	1	2	3	4	Total
Mexico	0	0	7	0	7
Japan	14	7	0	14	35

at Tom Benson Hall of Fame Stadium, Canton, Ohio, United States

- Date: July 15, 2015
- Game time: 15:30
- Game weather: partly cloudy
- Game attendance: 250
- Referee: E.Bolstad • Umpire: D.Sinclair • Linesman: M.Mikkelson • Line judge: V.Lamminsalo • Back judge: A.Barinaga • Field judge: F.Rassmussen • Side judge: J.Batzler • Alternate: D.Leoniak •

Japan had Mexico reeling immediately as Tetsuo Takata connected with Takashi Kurihara for 70 yards just 79 seconds into the game. The two hooked up again later in the quarter on a 10-yard score. Naoki Maeda found the end zone on a 17-yard pass from Takata, and Japan walked into halftime up three scores. The offensive fireworks continued, and by the time it was over, Japan put up some impressive numbers. Takata was 17-of-24 for 223 yards with three touchdowns, while Kurihara registered four catches for 87 yards and the two scores. The running game averaged 6.4 yards per touch, while Taku Lee and Ryo Takagi each registered touchdowns. On the flip side, Japan's defense was on point as defensive linemen Ryota Takahashi (5 tackles, sack) and Tori Hirasawa (4½, sack, two tackles for loss) disrupted the offensive flow for Mexico. The Japanese defense forced Roberto Vega (11-of-21, 136 yards, touchdown) into four interceptions. Japan has been to the IFAF World Championship finals three times prior, twice winning the gold medal. With its convincing win over Mexico, Japan returned to the gold-medal game to take on Team USA, which it has never beat.

Game 9

Quarter	1	2	3	4	Total
United States	26	28	7	21	82
France	0	0	0	0	0

at Tom Benson Hall of Fame Stadium, Canton, Ohio, United States

- Date: July 15, 2015
- Game time: 19:00
- Game weather: sunny/clear
- Game attendance: 500
- Referee: N.Hiroyasu • Umpire: I.Veronica • Linesman: Z.Harangi • Line judge: F.Rosa • Back judge: P.Mercer • Field judge: A.Takakura • Side judge: S.Dove • Alternate: K.Leido •

Playing in its own country for the first time in men's IFAF World Championship history, and in the city of the birthplace of professional football, the United States beat France, 82–0, setting a new Team USA record for points scored in an IFAF game. None of the U.S. games have been close in Canton, as the U.S. has beaten Japan, Mexico and France by a combined 155–24 (30–6 against Mexico and 43–18 over Japan). Team USA MVP and U.S. running back Aaron Wimberly, broke a U.S. record for most rushing yards in a game, with 117 yards rushing and a touchdown. Unlike its first two games, the United States (3–0) came out strong against the French and put things away relatively early. Wimberly opened the scoring with a 17-yard touchdown run. B.J. Beatty then recovered a blocked punt by Robert Virgil, and it was 12–0 early. By the time the quarter was over, Trent Steelman added a 49-yard touchdown catch from Kevin Burke, and Matt Oh not only sacked Perez Mattison but recovered the fumble for a score to make it a 26-point lead. The United States was up 54–0 at halftime. The U.S. dominated on offense, with 334 yards rushing and 454 total yards. The defense was just as impressive, causing 4 turnovers and holding France's offense to minus-26 yards rushing, and 75 yards of total offense.

=== 5th Place Game ===
Quarter	1	2	3	4	Total
South Korea	0	7	0	7	14
Australia	14	6	7	15	42

at Tom Benson Hall of Fame Stadium, Canton, Ohio, United States

- Date: July 18, 2015
- Game time: 12:00
- Game weather: Sunny
- Game attendance: 100
- Referee: N. Hiroyasu • Umpire: D. Leoniak • Center judge: I. Veronica • Linesman: Z. Harangi • Line judge: F. Rosa • Back judge: K. Walentynowicz • Field judge: D. Cardenas • Side judge: J. Batzler • Alternate: M. Sampaio

Australia beat South Korea, 42–14, to clinch fifth place at the IFAF World Championship. The Australians went up 7–0 in the first quarter. Another Aussie drive put the team in scoring range late in the first quarter. On 3rd down and goal from the 6 yard line, Conor Foley seemed to be tackled by two defenders at the 10 yard line. Foley broke through those two tackles, and spun away from yet another defender to give Australia a 14-point lead. Australia scored yet again when Damien Donaldson intercepted a pass on the Aussie 35 yard line and returned it five yards before lateraling to Calvin Young, who then raced 60 more yards to give the squad a 20–0 lead late in the second quarter. Australian quarterback Jared Stegman had another good game, going 18-of-27 for 224 yards and a touchdown, and he tied a tournament record by throwing six touchdown passes. Daniel Strickland led the receivers, with 88 yards on five catches (including a touchdown), and Tyson Garnham hauled in nine passes for 70 yards. Nate Lansdel added a score and 39 yards rushing, and the Australian offense recorded three touchdowns on the ground. South Korea finished winless in the tournament, but the team did make history when San Hong Kim scored the country's first offensive touchdown in IFAFWC history and backed it up when Bo Sung Park ran one in as well. Australia got the win, but South Korea had better rushing and receiving performers. Sung Park ran for 69 yards on 16 carries while Hong Kim caught 4 passes for 140 yards.

=== Bronze medal game ===
Quarter	1	2	3	4	Total
Mexico	9	0	0	11	20
France	0	7	0	0	7

at Tom Benson Hall of Fame Stadium, Canton, Ohio, United States

- Date: July 18, 2015
- Game time: 15:30
- Game weather: Partly Cloudy
- Game attendance: 250

In the bronze medal game, Mexico defeated France 20–7. It was their first win of the tournament. France had lost their starting quarterback, Paul Durand, to an injury in the previous game against the U.S. He made one pass attempt, but pain sidelined him after that play. Without Durand, France had to rely on the oldest quarterback in the tournament, 41-year-old Perez Mattison. Mexico's defense forced three interceptions (by Cesar Martinez, Jaime Heras and Vladislave Ávila), and the Mexican offense had their best game of the tournament. Alexis Magallanes scored from 55 yards out on the second play of the game to give Mexico the early lead. José Carlos Maltos made a 40-yard field goal, and Mexico went up 9–0, but a 12-yard touchdown by Stephan Yepmo (17 carries, 78 yards) capped off a seven-play, 68-yard drive that put France down by only two at halftime. France drove inside Mexico territory to start the second half, but a Mattison fumble gave it back to Mexico. Maltos made a 53-yard field goal to give Mexico a 12–7 lead. Mexico running back and team MVP Allan Rosado rushed for 115 yards and a touchdown. Despite the loss, France matched its highest finish in World Championship history. Mattison finished the day 17 of 31 for 160 yards.

=== Gold medal game ===
Quarter	1	2	3	4	Total
Japan	0	6	6	0	12
United States	16	22	7	14	59

at Tom Benson Hall of Fame Stadium, Canton, Ohio, United States

- Date: July 18, 2015
- Game time: 19:00
- Game weather: clear
- Game attendance: 3,000
- Referee: E.Bolstad • Umpire: D.Parsons • Center judge: M.Matos • Linesman: M.Mikkelsen • Line judge: G.Udvardi • Back judge: P.Mercer • Field judge: F.Rasmussen • Side judge: J.P. Canto • Alternate: I.Veronica

Japan and the United States had each won two World Championships. Team USA won its third straight IFAF World Championship after a crushing 59–12 win over Japan. Each member won a gold medal for the first time. It came in just about every facet as defense was responsible for three touchdowns – a 75-yard pick six by David Guthrie, a 36-yard fumble recovery by Kyle Olugbode, and another fumble recovery by Alex Gross in the end zone. It came with touchdowns from eight players, and it came with 413 yards on 62 plays for an average of 6.7 yards. Tournament MVP wide receiver Trent Steelman led all rushers with 56 yards and a score while Dylan Favre, Aaron Wimberly, and Kevin Burke added rushing scores. Tight end Ernst Brun registered the only receiving touchdown. The defense limited the Japanese rushing game to minus-7 yards. The one minor bright spot for Japan was in the passing game, where Kato (12-22-141 yards) performed very well. Dylan Favre for the US however had a near perfect game (12-12-124).

The 2015 Team USA was the most dominant in terms of points (214) and kept the Americans undefeated in IFAF play through 11 games. The 11 games won matches Japan's for most wins by a country, though Japan has lost four times – three of them to the United States. Steelman logged 18 catches for 258 yards and two scores, rushed for 66 yards and a score, and recovered a fumble for a touchdown over four games. He led his team in receiving in three games, and in rushing in the fourth. Several Americans made the All-Tournament team: Steelman, Burke, Wimberly, Brun, and James Atoe on offense, and Jack Sherlock, Steve Kurfehs, Gross, Guthrie, and Robert Virgil on defense. The 3,000 fans at the game was not only the largest crowd in the tournament, but also the first game in the tournament to have more than 1,000 in attendance, yet a far cry from the previous high of 20,000 set in Austria in 2011.
