= 2014 World University American Football Championship =

Tournament details
- Host nation: Sweden
- Dates: May 1 – May 11
- No. of nations: 5

Final positions
- Champions: Mexico
- Runner-up: Japan
- Third-place: Sweden

The 2014 World University American Football Championship was an international college American football tournament that was held from May 1 to 11, 2014 in Uppsala, Sweden, at Österängens IP. It was the first World University Championship for American football. The tournament was held in round-robin format, with each team facing each other once.

== Teams ==
- Mexico
- Japan
- Sweden
- Finland
- China

== Final standings ==
Rk	Team	W	L	PF	PA
1st place, gold medalist(s)	Mexico	4	0	174	6
2nd place, silver medalist(s)	Japan	3	1	202	14
3rd place, bronze medalist(s)	Sweden	2	2	69	125
4	Finland	1	3	53	165
5	China	0	4	0	197

== Matches ==
Game 1

Quarter	1	2	3	4	Total
Finland	12	12	16	7	47
China	0	0	0	0	0

- Date: May 2, 2014
- Game time: 15:00
- Box score

Game 2

Quarter	1	2	3	4	Total
Mexico	21	13	14	14	62
Sweden	0	0	0	0	0

- Date: May 2, 2014
- Game time: 17:30
- Box score

Game 3

Quarter	1	2	3	4	Total
Japan	28	28	14	14	84
Finland	0	0	0	0	0

- Date: May 4, 2014
- Game time: 15:00
- Box score

Game 4

Quarter	1	2	3	4	Total
China	0	0	0	0	0
Sweden	27	14	0	0	41

- Date: May 4, 2014
- Game time: 17:30
- Box score

Game 5

Quarter	1	2	3	4	Total
Finland	0	0	0	0	0
Mexico	14	20	13	6	53

- Date: May 6, 2014
- Game time: 15:00
- Box score

Game 6

Quarter	1	2	3	4	Total
Japan	28	9	3	14	54
China	0	0	0	0	0

- Date: May 6, 2014
- Game time: 18:30
- Box score

Game 7

Quarter	1	2	3	4	Total
Sweden	0	0	0	0	0
Japan	24	21	0	12	57

- Date: May 8, 2014
- Game time: 18:30
- Box score

Game 8

Quarter	1	2	3	4	Total
China	0	0	0	0	0
Mexico	27	7	14	7	55

- Date: May 9, 2014
- Game time: 18:30
- Box score

Game 9

Quarter	1	2	3	4	Total
Sweden	7	7	14	0	28
Finland	0	6	0	0	6

- Date: May 10, 2014
- Game time: 18:30
- Box score

Game 10

Quarter	1	2	3	4	Total
Mexico	0	7	0	7	14
Japan	0	0	6	0	6

- Date: May 11, 2014
- Game time: 16:00
- Box score
