= Canada men's national football team =

Canada
- Nickname: Team Canada (Équipe Canada)
- Association: Football Canada
- Head coach: Jesse Maddox
- Team colours

First international
- Canada 45–10 France (Graz, Austria; July 9, 2011)

Biggest win
- Canada 56–0 Italy (Cagliari, Italy; April 19, 2025)

Biggest defeat
- United States 50–7 Canada (Vienna, Austria; July 16, 2011)

IFAF World Championship
- Appearances: 1 (first in 2011)
- Best result: Runner-up (in 2011)

International record (W–L–T)
- 6–2–0

Canada men's national football team
Medal record

Men's American football

Representing Canada

World Championship
Silver medal – second place	2011 Austria	Team competition

Gridiron Nations Championship
Gold medal – first place	2025 Europe	Team competition

The Canada men's national football team represent Canada in Senior Men's international gridiron football competitions. It is managed by the Team Canada National Men's Football Society under the supervision and governance of Football Canada. It is recognized by the International Federation of American Football (IFAF).

Football Canada is the governing body for amateur Canadian football, but IFAF-sponsored games are played using American football rules. The team competed for their first and only IFAF World Championship in 2011.

The 2025–26 Senior Men's Team originally organized a side for the IFAF World Championship. A North American qualifier against Team Mexico in Mexico City was tentatively scheduled for February in cooperation with the Mexican American Football Association (FMFA) and IFAF. FMFA ultimately opted not to host or travel to Canada. As a result, Team Canada is the only active national team from North America.

With no organization in place for the IFAF World Championship scheduled for Germany in 2025, the team needed to shift their focus to challenging teams to games in Europe and Asia.

Canada scheduled an international friendly against Italy in Cagliari, Sardinia, Italy, on 19 April 2025. Canada won 56–0. It was IFAF's first intercontinental men's tackle game played since the 2015 world championship, a span of nearly 10 years. After the game, Coach Jesse Maddox stated that he was ready to bring Canada back to Europe to face the European champion later in the year.

Since then, Canada partnered with Germany and Italy to compete in the Gridiron Nations Championship. Canada faced Italy in Milan on 9 November 2025, and won 20-17. A week later, they defeated Germany 25–10 to win the Gridiron Nations Championship, the first intercontinental men's tackle football championship held in over a decade.

Since the 2011 senior event, Canada's flagship men's tackle program is the Canada national junior football team, an elite U20 developmental program that participates in the IFAF Junior World Championship, which was a biennial championship until 2020, then moved to a quadrennial event. The IFAF Junior World Football tournament in Edmonton, Alberta, in July 2024 was won by Canada for a third consecutive time, and the fourth overall. Canada is the most successful team at the WJFC. In addition to the 2024 world championship, they won the 2012 Under-19 championship, upsetting the favourite and host team, the United States, to give the US national team its first loss in international competition. They won the 2016 championship in China, then defended their championship with a 2018 title in Mexico. The 2020 tournament was cancelled due to the COVID-19 pandemic.

== History ==
Football Canada became a full member of the IFAF in 2004. Thereafter Canada competed in international junior, flag, and women's football events. In 2011 a senior men's team made their international debut at the 2011 IFAF World Championship. The team's head coach was Larry Haylor, the former head coach of the Western Ontario Mustangs, who retired from the program as the winningest coach in the history of U Sports football.

Unlike the US national team, active professional players are allowed to participate, and a handful of Canadian Football League players participated on the national squad, although the fact that the CFL's season overlapped with the 2011 World Championship prevented most of the best non-import players in that league from participating.

== IFAF World Championship record ==
Year	Position	GP	W	L	PF	PA
(Italy) 1999	Did not participate					
(Germany) 2003	Did not participate					
(Japan) 2007	Did not participate					
(Austria) 2011	2nd	4	3	1	119	101
(United States) 2015	Qualified, withdrew					

== Gridiron Nations Championship record ==
Year	Position	GP	W	L	PF	PA
(European Union) 2025	1st	2	2	0	45	27
