= South Korea national American football team =

South Korea 대한민국
- Name: South Korea (대한민국)
- Association: KAFA
- Region: Asia (IFAF Asia)
- Founded: 1946
- IFAF affiliation: 2000
- Colors: Red, white, and blue
- Head coach: Sun-Il Beak

First international
- South Korea 22–13 Australia (Sydney, Australia; January 2007)

Biggest win
- South Korea 69–7 Kuwait (Seoul, South Korea; April 12, 2014)

Biggest defeat
- South Korea 0–77 United States (Kawasaki, Japan; July 10, 2007)

Korea national American football team helmet right face

The South Korea national American football team is the official American football team for South Korea and controlled by the Korea American Football Association.

== IFAF World Championship record ==
Year	Position	GP	W	L	PF	PA
(Italy) 1999	Did not participate					
(Germany) 2003	Did not participate					
(Japan) 2007	5th	3	1	2	5	109
(Austria) 2011	Did not qualify					
(United States) 2015	6th	3	0	3	20	117

2015 Canton, Ohio

Schedule and scores

July 9, 2015
South Korea 6: Australia 47

July 12, 2015
South Korea 0: Brazil 28

July 18, 2015
South Korea 14: Australia 42

== See also ==
- Korea American Football Association
- International Federation of American Football
- 2007 IFAF World Championship
