= IFAF World Championship =

International gridiron competition

IFAF World Championship of American Football
- Upcoming season or competition: TBA
- Sport: American football
- Founded: 1999
- No. of teams: 12 (tournament); 71 (eligible national teams)
- Most recent champion: United States (3rd title)
- Most titles: United States (3 titles)
- Website: Official website

The IFAF World Championship of American Football (also known as the IFAF World cup) is an international gridiron competition held every four years and contested by teams representing member nations. The competition is run by the International Federation of American Football (IFAF), the international governing body for the sport. Seventy-one nations have a national American football team. The most recent tournament, in 2015, featured seven teams.

The defending champions are the United States, who won the 2015 championship after winning both the 2007 and 2011 editions. The U.S. team did not compete in the World Cup until 2007 and have won every tournament since. Prior to the American entrance, Japan won the 1999 and 2003 championships.

The championship was held in Italy in 1999, in Germany in 2003, in Kawasaki, Japan, in 2007, and in Austria in 2011. The 2015 IFAF World Championship was originally going to be held in Stockholm, Sweden, but local organizers had to cancel the event due to lack of sponsorship. The 2015 tournament was played in Canton, Ohio, United States.

The following edition has been postponed several times. First scheduled in Australia in 2019, then cancelled, it was moved to Germany for 2023, then postponed to 2025. No announcements were made about the 2025 event which did not happen. Qualifiers were held in 2021.

== Tournament format ==
At the 2011 championship, the championship tournament consisted of eight teams divided into two groups of four (there were six teams in 1999 and 2007, four in 2003, and seven in 2015). The opening round featured a round-robin tournament within the groups, with each team playing each other once, but as opposed to a tournament bracket after the games were completed, the teams with the best record from each group met in the gold medal game, with the second-place teams in each group playing for the bronze medal, the third-place teams playing in the 5th-place game, and the fourth-place teams playing in the 7th-place game, thus guaranteeing each team four games.

Automatic berths included the host nation and the defending champions. Both finalists from the European Championship of American football tournament received berths. Two teams from the Pan American Federation of American Football received berths, as did one member each from the Asian Federation of American Football and from the Oceania Federation of American Football.

For the 2019 championship (postponed to 2023, then 2025), the tournament will expand to 12 teams. Teams will be divided into four groups, each consisting of three teams. Teams will play the other two teams in their group once each, for a total of two group-stage games. Teams will then advance to the second round, and from there to the placement and medal games.

Because American football is far more dominant in the United States than anywhere else in the world, the United States did not field a team in the tournament for its first two editions. The United States has fielded a squad for the last three iterations, but with extremely restrictive criteria that make most American football players ineligible for the team. Despite the restrictions, the United States has won all three world championships in which they have competed. Similarly, Canada (where Canadian football, a related sport, has widespread popularity) did not participate until the 2011 competition, when the Canadian team finished second to the United States.

== Results ==
=== Summaries ===
Year	Host	Final			Third-place match			Number of teams
Year	Host	Champions	Score	Runners-up	3rd place	Score	4th place	Number of teams
1999	Italy	Japan	6–0 (OT)	Mexico	Sweden	38–13	Italy	6
2003	Germany	Japan	34–14	Mexico	Germany	36–7	France	4
2007	Japan	United States	23–20 (OT)	Japan	Germany	7–0	Sweden	6
2011	Austria	United States	50–7	Canada	Japan	17–14	Mexico	8
2015	United States	United States	59–12	Japan	Mexico	20–7	France	7

=== Results ===
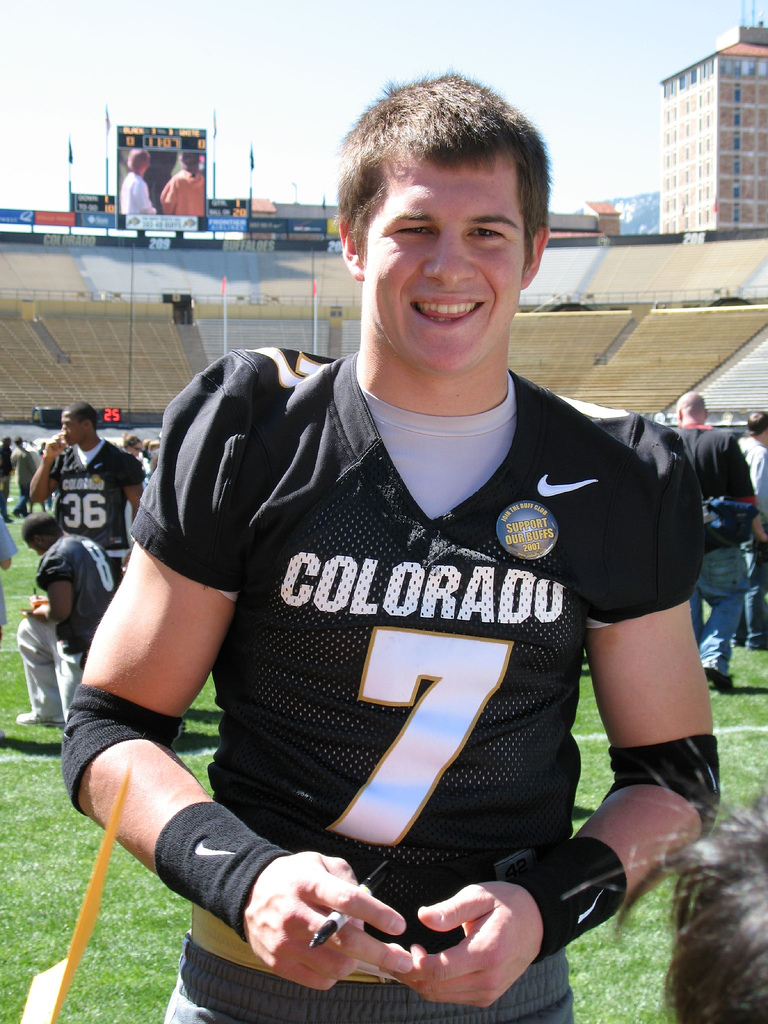
Cody Hawkins, quarterback of the United States 2011 World Championship team.

Team	1999 (6)	2003 (4)	2007 (6)	2011 (8)	2015 (7)
Australia	5th	–	–	8th	5th
Austria	–	–	–	7th	–
Brazil	–	–	–	–	7th
Canada	–	–	–	2nd	–
Finland	6th	–	–	–	–
France	–	4th	6th	6th	4th
Germany	–	3rd	3rd	5th	–
Italy	4th	–	–	–	–
Japan	1st	1st	2nd	3rd	2nd
Mexico	2nd	2nd	–	4th	3rd
South Korea	–	–	5th	–	6th
Sweden	3rd	–	4th	–	–
United States	–	–	1st	1st	1st

=== Rankings ===
Pos.	Team	Champions	Runners-up	Third	Fourth
1st	United States	3 (2007, 2011, 2015)	–	–	–
2nd	Japan	2 (1999, 2003)	2 (2007, 2015)	1 (2011)	–
3rd	Mexico	–	2 (1999, 2003)	1 (2015)	1 (2011)
4th	Canada	–	1 (2011)	–	–
5th	Germany	–	–	2 (2003, 2007)	–
6th	Sweden	–	–	1 (1999)	1 (2007)
7th	France	–	–	–	2 (2003, 2015)
8th	Italy	–	–	–	1 (1999)

=== Medal table ===
As of 2015

Rank	Nation	Gold	Silver	Bronze	Total
1	United States	3	0	0	3
2	Japan	2	2	1	5
3	Mexico	0	2	1	3
4	Canada	0	1	0	1
5	Germany	0	0	2	2
6	Sweden	0	0	1	1
Totals (6 entries)		5	5	5	15

== IFAF World Championship records ==
=== Rushing yards ===
==== Tournament ====
447 – Lars Gustafsson, Sweden (1999)

==== Game ====
232 – Lars Gustafsson, Sweden (Sweden vs. Italy, 3 July 1999)

=== Rushing touchdowns ===
==== Tournament ====
5 – DeShawn Thomas, U.S. (2011)

==== Game ====
3 – Mario Nerad, Austria (Australia vs. Austria, 15 July 2011)

=== Passing yards ===
==== Tournament ====
881 – Joachim Ullrich, Germany (2011)

==== Game ====
281 – Kiernan Dorney, Australia (Australia vs. Germany, 12 July 2011)

=== Touchdown passes ===
==== Tournament ====
6 – Michael Faulds, Canada (2011)
6 – Joachim Ullrich, Germany (2011)

==== Game ====
4 Jared Stegman, Australia (Australia vs South Korea, 9 July 2015)

=== Interceptions thrown ===
==== Tournament ====
7 – Jarkko Nieminen, Finland (1999)

==== Game ====
3 – Kiernan Dorney, Austria vs. Australia (15 July 2011)
3 – Carlos Altimirano, Mexico vs. Germany (10 July 2003)
3 – Joachim Ullrich, Germany vs. Mexico (10 July 2003)
3 – David Ward, Austria vs. Japan (1 July 1999)

=== Receiving yards ===
==== Tournament ====
433 – Niklas Roemer, Germany (2011)

==== Game ====
180 – Niklas Roemer, Germany vs France (16 July 2011)

=== Receptions ===
==== Tournament ====
26 – Nate Kmic, U.S. (2011)

==== Game ====
8 – Niklas Roemer, Germany vs. Austria (12 July 2011)
8 – Nate Kmic, U.S. vs. Germany (12 July 2011)
8 – Boti Bramer, Germany vs. Mexico (10 July 2003)

=== Touchdown receptions ===
==== Tournament ====
4 – Niklas Roemer, Germany (2011)
4 – Matteo Soresini, Italy (1999)

==== Game ====
2 – by several players, most recent: Trent Steelman, U.S. vs. France (15 July 2015)

=== Longest plays ===
==== Rushing ====
88 – N.Khandar, France vs Australia (12 July 2015)

==== Passing ====
89 – Ullrich to Roemer, Germany vs. France (16 July 2011)

==== Punt return ====
85 – Marcel Duft, Germany vs. Sweden (14 July 2007)

==== Kickoff return ====
102 – Anthony Dablé, France vs. Brazil (8 July 2015)

==== Interception return ====
95 – Marcus Weil, Germany vs. U.S. (12 July 2007)

==== Fumble return ====
10 Terrence Jackson, U.S. vs. Germany (7 July 2011)

==== Field goal ====
56 – José Carlos Maltos, Mexico vs. Austria (10 July 2011)

==== Blocked punt return touchdown ====
26 – Diezeas Calbert, U.S. vs. Australia (8 July 2011)

==== Blocked field goal return touchdown ====
75 – Johnny Dingle, U.S. vs. Germany (10 July 2011)

== See also ==
- International Federation of American Football
- IFAF Women's World Championship
- IFAF Junior World Championship
