= 1999 IFAF World Championship =

American football tournament

Coordinates: 38°09′10″N 13°20′33″E

Tournament details
- Host nation: Italy
- Dates: 24 June – 4 July
- No. of nations: 6

Final positions
- Champions: Japan
- Runner-up: Mexico
- Third-place: Sweden

The 1999 IFAF World Championship was the inaugural IFAF World Championship, an international American football championship run by the International Federation of American Football (IFAF). It was played in Palermo, Italy from 24 June to 4 July 1999. The tournament was contested by six nations and was won by Japan.

== Participants ==
- Mexico
- Japan
- Sweden
- Australia
- Finland
- Italy

== Rosters ==
Finland 1999 IFAF World Championship roster
Quarterbacks: -- Jarkko Nieminen; -- Petri Pekkanen; Running Backs: -- Mika Ahl; -- Jani Puustinen; -- Karim Segheir; -- Tero Talonen; Wide Receivers: -- Nikko Olsson; -- Mikko Pimminainen; -- Jarkko Pippola; -- Timo Seppänen; Tight ends: -- Tommi Padatsu; -- Jukka Ryynänen	Offensive Linemen: -- Stefan Andersson; -- Patrik Karbin; -- Ilkka Katainen; -- Jari Lyhty; -- Tomi Pirhonen; -- Marko Puustinen; -- Mikko Sorvali; -- Mikko Vento; Defensive Linemen: -- Seppo Evwaraye DT; -- Jose Hakala DE; -- Timo Jokela DT; -- Ville Kurvinen DE; -- Pertti Lautala DT; -- Pasi Lautala DT; -- Marko Luoma DE	Linebackers: -- Henri Forsberg; -- Matti Lottonen; -- Kari Lyhty; -- Petri Pellinen; -- Juhani Salo; -- Jarkko Ylätalo; Defensive Backs: -- Markus Forsberg S; -- Matias Forslund S; -- Mika Laurila S; -- Sebastian Lind CB; -- Simo Mahkonen CB; -- Jani Pihlman CB; -- Jari Savela CB; -- Jukka Tahvanainen CB; -- Jouni Virta S; Special Teams: -- Tapio Hentunen P

Italy 1999 IFAF World Championship roster
Quarterbacks: -- Federico Castellani; -- Marcello Lio; -- Elvis Taroni; Running Backs: -- Alessandro Angeloni; -- Massimiliano Fagotti FB; -- Alessandro Greco; -- Cristian Longhi FB; -- Carlo Mezzadri FB; -- Giosue Rizzuto; Wide Receivers: -- Christian Costanzo; -- Fabio Capodaglio; -- Gianluca Mannatrizio; -- Matteo Soresini; Tight ends: -- Massimo Vicinelli	Offensive Linemen: -- Corrado Camerino G; -- Emanuele Costanzo C; -- Alessandro Dallai G; -- Massimo Gertosio T; -- Davide Giuliano T; -- Placido Massella G; -- Stefano Neva C; -- Mauro Salvemini T; -- Armaldo Sbriccoli C; -- Mauro Trombetti T; Defensive Linemen: -- Luca Bellora DE; -- Corrado Camerino DT; -- Francesco Fabbri DT; -- Fabio Franzini; -- Fulvio Rusconi DT	Linebackers: -- Alessandro Aldrovandi OLB; -- Giuseppe Anello MLB; -- Claudio Biavati MLB; -- Massimiliano Bonomo OLB; -- Marco Boscolo OLB; -- Ottavio Carnelli OLB; -- Diego Gennaro OLB; -- Ezio Marone MLB; -- Paolo Orofino; -- Stefano Paolucci; -- Antonio Pauletto OLB; Defensive Backs: -- Stefano De Giorgi CB; -- Davide Donnini CB; -- Renato Gargiulo SS; -- Paolo Guerini CB; -- Enrico Leonardi CB; -- Matteo Mantovani CB; -- Filippo Piermaria CB; -- Marco Polizzi CB; -- Jouni Virta S; -- Andrea Ventura; Special Teams: -- Vito Lafata P/K

Mexico 1999 IFAF World Championship roster
Quarterbacks: 3 Enrique Villanueva; 13 Diego Rodríguez; 19 Antonio Toro; Running Backs: 34 Oliver Feria; 1 Eduardo Núñez; 33 Mauricio Loustaunau; 21 Jerónimo Huerta; Wide Receivers: 88 Héctor Cuervo; 80 Sergio Aguilar; 5 Mauricio Líbano; 12 Víctor Narváez; Tight Ends: 82 Félix Joanem	Offensive Linemen Defensive Linemen: 99 Erick Sámano DT; 6 Jesús Alfredo Muñoz DE	Linebackers Defensive Backs: 27 Edgar Loyo CB; 10 Jesús Medina CB; Special Teams: 37 Alejandro Barona K; 20 Roberto Mendoza P

Sweden 1999 IFAF World Championship roster
Quarterbacks: -- Hakan Eriksson; -- Martin Hejdesten; -- Martin Wiman; Running Backs: -- Kaj Dyrvold; -- Lars Gustafsson; -- Eric Hakansson; -- Rachid Karlsson; -- Niklas Karlsson; Wide Receivers: -- Joel Andersson; -- Henrik Eriksson; -- Benny Granqvist; -- Mattias Hejdesten; -- Yohan Ohlsson; -- Johan Perlstrom; Tight ends: -- Ola Olsson; -- Mikael Tagel	Offensive Linemen: -- Carl-Johan Blomwall; -- Magnus Dahlin; -- Ted Hagberg; -- Michael Jonsson; -- Tomas Lohr; -- Sighsten Lundqvist; -- Bjorn Marcusson; -- Marten Persson; Defensive Linemen: -- Andreas Blomquist; -- Jorgen Lejon; -- Dann Petersson; -- Richard Rosenholtz; -- Peter Rundberg; -- Ola Schon; -- Kristian Stenshamn; -- Jonas Svan; -- Anders Tibling	Linebackers: -- Martin Janzon; -- Giacomo La Cerva; -- Kristian Lonnesjo; -- Marcus Miramahdi; -- Stefan Skoldeback; -- Brian Vilborg; Defensive Backs: -- Mikael Berg; -- Andreas Ekholm; -- Mats Eriksson; -- Magnus Kullenberg; -- Lars Leksell; -- Peter Raicevic; -- Eric Saeden; -- Richard Trincas; Special Teams: -- Ola Kimrin K

== Group stage ==
=== Group A ===
Team	Pld	W	L	PF	PA
Mexico	2	2	0	143	0
Italy	2	1	1	28	61
Finland	2	0	2	7	117

Quarter	1	2	3	4	Total
Italy	7	7	7	7	28
Finland	0	7	0	0	7

- Date: June 24

Quarter	1	2	3	4	Total
Mexico	24	35	8	22	89
Finland	0	0	0	0	0

- Date: June 27

Quarter	1	2	3	4	Total
Mexico	21	7	12	14	54
Italy	0	0	0	0	0

- Date: June 30

=== Group B ===
Team	Pld	W	L	PF	PA
Japan	2	2	0	78	14
Sweden	2	1	1	36	30
Australia	2	0	2	6	76

Quarter	1	2	3	4	Total
Sweden	7	3	6	6	22
Australia	0	6	0	0	6

- Date: June 25

Quarter	1	2	3	4	Total
Japan	7	7	7	3	24
Sweden	0	0	14	0	14

- Date: June 28

Quarter	1	2	3	4	Total
Japan	14	16	14	10	54
Australia	0	0	0	0	0

- Date: July 1

== Fifth place match ==
Quarter	1	2	3	4	Total
Australia	0	0	0	10	10
Finland	0	7	0	0	7

== Third place match ==
Quarter	1	2	3	4	Total
Sweden	10	13	3	12	38
Italy	0	6	7	0	13

- Date: July 3

== Final ==
Quarter	1	2	3	4	OT	Total
Japan	0	0	0	0	6	6
Mexico	0	0	0	0	0	0

- Date: July 4

Both teams entered the gold medal game undefeated in group play. The Mexico defense had not allowed any points, shutting out their two previous opponents, and the Mexican offense was impressive in beating Finland 89-0 (the most points ever in an IFAF Tournament game) and Italy 54-0. The Championship Game was a defensive struggle, with both teams committing turnovers (5 by Mexico, 2 by Japan), and for the first time in the tournament, Mexico did not score a point in any quarter. Japan held a slight advantage in total yards gained (233 to Mexico's 198). In overtime, Japan scored first on 5 yard pass from Sunaga to Abe. The extra point kick was wide, and Japan led 6-0. As they had all game, the Japanese defense kept Mexico out of the endzone, sealing the victory for Japan.

== Winner ==
1999 IFAF World Cup winners
JAPAN
First title

== Statistics ==
Pos	Team	Games	Win	Lose	Points for	Points against	Difference
1	Japan	3	3	0	84	14	+70
2	Mexico	3	2	1	143	6	+137
3	Sweden	3	2	1	74	43	+31
4	Italy	3	1	2	41	99	-58
5	Australia	3	1	2	16	83	-67
6	Finland	3	0	3	14	127	-113
