= 2003 IFAF World Championship =

American football championship

Tournament details
- Host nation: Germany
- Dates: July 10 – July 12
- No. of nations: 4

Final positions
- Champions: Japan
- Runner-up: Mexico
- Third-place: Germany

The 2003 IFAF World Championship was the second instance of the IFAF World Championship, an American football world championship held by International Federation of American Football (IFAF). The tournament was held in Germany at Herbert Dröse Stadion and Berliner Strasse Stadion. Japan won the championship for the second time in a row.

== Participants ==
- Japan (Asian champion)
- Mexico (American champion)
- France (European representatives)
- Germany (qualify automatically as the hosts)

== Venues ==
Venue	City	Capacity
Stadion an der Berliner Straße	Wiesbaden, Hesse	11,498
Herbert-Dröse-Stadion	Hanau, Hesse	16,000

== Rounds ==
Semi-finals
Japan	23
France	6
Mexico	21
Germany	17

Final
Japan	34
Mexico	14
Third place
Germany	36
France	7

=== Semi finals ===
Quarter	1	2	3	4	Total
Japan	0	0	20	3	23
France	0	0	0	6	6

at Stadion an der Berliner Straße

- Date: July 10
- Game time: 14:00
- Game attendance: 1200
- Referee: (United Kingdom) Jim Briggs

Quarter	1	2	3	4	Total
Mexico	7	0	7	7	21
Germany	0	3	0	14	17

at Stadion an der Berliner Straße

- Date: July 10
- Game time: 18:00
- Game attendance: 1600
- Referee: (Sweden) Fereed Adus

=== Final ===
Quarter	1	2	3	4	Total
Japan	0	17	7	10	34
Mexico	7	0	7	0	14

at Herbert Dröse Stadion

- Date: July 12
- Game time: 18:00
- Game attendance: 2600
- Referee: (United Kingdom) Jim Briggs

== Winner ==
2003 IFAF World Cup winners
Japan
Second title

== Statistics ==
Pos	Team	Games	Win	Lose	Points for	Points against	Difference
1	Japan	2	2	0	57	20	+37
2	Mexico	2	1	1	35	51	−16
3	Germany	2	1	1	53	28	+25
4	France	2	0	2	13	59	−46

== All-Star Team ==
The following players were selected as part of the tournament's All-Star Team.

2003 IFAF World Championship All-Star Team
Offense		Defense		Specialists	
Position	Player	Position	Player	Position	Player
QB	(Japan) Yuichi Tomizawa	DE	(Germany) Peter Groß-Pass	P/K	(Japan) Mahoto Koyama
RB	(Japan) Ikunori Hanna	DE	(France) Francesco Pepe Esposito	RS	(Mexico) Iván de Sandozequi
RB	(Japan) Takuya Furutani	DT	(Germany) Cristopher Königsmann		
WR	(Japan) Masato Itai	DT	(Japan) Mirushi Fuji		
WR	(Mexico) Christian González	LB	(Japan) Kanchito Tamai		
TE	(Germany) Alexej Mittendorf	LB	(Japan) Shinzo Yamada		
LT	(Germany) Andre Mathes	LB	(Mexico) Guillermo Ruiz Burguete		
LG	(Japan) Eita Imai	CB	(Mexico) Jose Guadalupe Rafael Martiñon		
C	(Germany) Frank Söhlke	CB	(Mexico) Masahiro Nomura		
RG	(Japan) Yasushi Furuhawa	FS	(Germany) Sebastian Tuch		
RT	(Japan) Yuki Terayama	SS	(Mexico) Francisco Rodríguez		
