= IFAF Africa =

African Confederation of American Football (ACAF)
- Members: 11
- Director: Awasum EM Junior
- Website: www.americanfootball.sport

The African Confédération of American Football is the governing body of American football in Africa. It comprises member fédérations from Africa vested in the promotion and development of American Football in Africa and its assimilated disciplines.

The African Confederation of American Football (ACAF) also organizes events in Africa but it is not limited to professional programs and events.

Awasum EM Junior is a sport diplomat and a prominent figure of American in Africa. Hé was elected as the Director of Africa for the IFAF Board. His term of office is 2023-2026.

== Members ==
As of September 2026:

- Cameroon, Cameroon American Football Federation, President Awasum EM Junior
- DR Congo
- Egypt, Egyptian Federation of American Football, President Ali Rafeek
- Ghana, Ghana American Football Federation, President Larry Wahab Abdul
- Ivory Coast, Ivorian Federation of American Football (FIFAM), President Stephane M'Boua
- Kenya, Kenya Federation of American Football, President George Alwanga
- Nigeria, Nigeria Federation of American Football (NFAF), President Babajide Akeredolu
- South Africa, Gridiron South Africa, President Stephen Radebe
- Tunisia, Tunisian Association of American Football, President Amine Ben Abdelkarim
- Uganda, American Football Federation of Uganda, President Steven George Okeng
- Zimbabwe, Zimbabwe American Football Federation, President Abednigo Mashuka
