= American football in Nigeria =

American football institute in Nigeria

American Football Association of Nigeria (NAFA)
- Federation: Africa (IFAF)
- Founded: 2019

American football in Nigeria is the sport of American football in Nigeria. The popularity of American football in the nation has grown substantially since 2010, becoming a major source of talent to the National Football League (NFL). The Nigerian Institute of American Football (NIAF) was the governing body for international American football in Nigeria under the broader International Federation of American Football (IFAF) for Africa until 2019, when the American Football Association of Nigeria (NAFA) took its place.

== NIAF history ==
The institute was founded in June 2011 in Zaria, Nigeria in cooperation with Ahmadu Bello University (ABU) by American former athletes Daryl Hayes, Ricardo Dickerson, and Gregory Hendricks with help from Nigerian athlete Ejike Ugboaja in an effort to popularize American football in the nation.

To educate potential coaches for the sport in the nation, coaching clinics were offered to help teach the basics of the game. The ABU had announced plans to offer a Programme of Study related to coaching American Football sometime in the future.

Since the founding of the NIAF, Nigeria has become the highest football-player-exporting country in Africa, with the Lagos Marines becoming the nation's most popular American football team. American football has also become one of the nation's top ten most streamed sports.

=== Funding ===
The majority of the NIAF's funding comes from the United States. Cash fundraising events in universities and schools and football material collection drives have mainly supplied the institute to date.

== Nigerian American Football Association (NAFA) ==
Founded in 2019 by Babajide Akeredolu and Oluwaseye Obatolu, NAFA aims to elevate the sport of American Football in Nigeria. Later into its journey, Lawrence Ojaide and Dominik Mueller, a German diplomat and founder of Lagos Marine, came onboard, significantly expanding NAFA's reach. Akeredolu, as a unifying leader, drives engagement and creates opportunities for stakeholders. Obatolu, the architect of NAFA's structure and ethos, shapes the organization's unique identity. Lawrence Ojaide, the on-ground dynamo and driving force on the ground, propelled NAFA's remarkable growth. Ojaide's spearheading efforts have been key in driving NAFA to success. William P. Obubo, Nneka Eze, Chuks Obiazor and Ife Omotalade played roles in the early stages but later took on less prominent positions in the development.

=== Funding ===
The majority of the NAFA's funding comes from the founders with some help from their sponsors.

=== Nigerian Secondary School Flag Football League (NSSFFL) ===
The NSSFFL is a league under NAFA whose goal is to promote the sport among secondary school students between the ages of 12 and 18 in the nation. The maiden league consisted of approximately 900 athletes who were part of 20 male and 20 female teams.

== Notable players ==
With the growing popularity of American football in Nigeria, the country has produced many notable players, including more than 50 players who have gone on to play in the National Football League (NFL). Osi Umenyiora, one of the earliest Nigerians to play in the NFL, has become a leader in recruiting and mentoring Nigerian players in the NFL.

Notable players include:

1. Ola Adeniyi – NFL linebacker (2018–2022)
2. Nelson Agholor – NFL wide receiver (2015–2022)
3. Obed Ariri – NFL kicker (1984, 1987)
4. Ade Aruna – NFL/CFL defensive end (2018–2022)
5. Jeremiah Attaochu – NFL linebacker (2014–2021)
6. Micah Awe – CFL linebacker (2017–2022)
7. Akin Ayodele – NFL linebacker (2002–2010)
8. Ben Banogu – NFL defensive end (2019–2022)
9. Caleb Benenoch – NFL guard (2016–2022)
10. Patrick Chukwurah – NFL defensive end (2001–2012)
11. Samson Ebukam – NFL defensive end (2017–2022)
12. Adimchinobe Echemandu – NFL running back (2004–2007)
13. Patrick Egu – NFL running back (1989–1991)
14. Isaiah Ekejiuba – NFL linebacker (2005–2011)
15. Mohammed Elewonibi – NFL/CFL tackle (1990–2005)
16. T. J. Fatinikun – NFL defensive end (2014–2015)
17. Samkon Gado – NFL running back (2005–2010)
18. Akbar Gbaja-Biamila – NFL defensive end/linebacker (2003–2008)
19. Obum Gwacham – NFL/CFL defensive end (2015–2022)
20. Israel Idonije – NFL defensive end (2003–2014)
21. Israel Ifeanyi – NFL defensive end (1996–2001)
22. Noah Igbinoghene – NFL cornerback (2020–2022)
23. Donald Igwebuike – NFL kicker (1985–1990)
24. James Ihedigbo – NFL safety (2007–2016)
25. Carl Ihenacho – NFL linebacker (2012)
26. Ben Ijalana – NFL offensive tackle (2011–2019)
27. Kenny Iwebema – NFL defensive end (2008–2010)
28. Chidi Iwuoma – NFL cornerback (2001–2007)
29. Kingsley Jonathan – NFL defensive end (2022)
30. Ufomba Kamalu – NFL/CFL defensive end (2016–2022)
31. Tem Lukabu – Colgate linebacker, Boston College DC
32. Praise Martin-Oguike – CFL defensive end (2021–2022)
33. Ikechuku Ndukwe – NFL offensive tackle/guard (2005–2011)
34. Efe Obada – NFL defensive end (2015–2022)
35. Emmanuel Ogbah – NFL defensive end (2016–2022)
36. Eric Ogbogu – NFL defensive end/linebacker (1998–2005)
37. Amen Ogbongbemiga – NFL linebacker (2021–2022)
38. Kehinde Oginni Hassan – NFL tight end (2022)
39. Adewale Ogunleye – NFL defensive end (2000–2010)
40. David Ojabo – NFL linebacker (2022)
41. Tony Okanlawon – NFL defensive back (2002–2004)
42. Chukwuma Okorafor – NFL offensive tackle (2018–2022)
43. Kenny Okoro – NFL cornerback (2013–2015)
44. Okechukwu Okoroha – Arena Football defensive back (2014–2022)
45. Ogbonnia Okoronkwo – NFL defensive end (2018–2022)
46. Amobi Okoye – NFL defensive tackle (2007–2014)
47. Christian Okoye – NFL running back (1987–1992)
48. Russell Okung – NFL offensive tackle (2010–2020)
49. Julian Okwara – NFL linebacker (2022–2022)
50. Romeo Okwara – NFL defensive end (2016–2022)
51. David Onyemata – NFL defensive tackle (2016–2022)
52. Babatunde Oshinowo – NFL defensive tackle (2006–2009)
53. Joseph Ossai – NFL defensive end (2021–2022)
54. Jeff Otah – NFL offensive tackle (2008–2011)
55. Troy Pelshak – NFL linebacker (1999–2000)
56. Tony Ugoh – NFL offensive tackle (2007–2012)
57. Osi Umenyiora – NFL defensive end (2003–2014)
58. Iheanyi Uwaezuoke – NFL wide receiver (1996–2000)
59. Prince Tega Wanogho – NFL offensive tackle (2020–2022)
