= NAFA =

NAFA may refer to:

== Organizations ==
- Nanyang Academy of Fine Arts, Singapore
- National Association of Fleet Administrators, Canada and U.S.
- Nauru Australian Football Association
- New Alliance of Faso, a political party in Burkina Faso
- American Football Association of Nigeria, Nigerian American Football Association, the Federation for American Football in Nigeria
- North American Falconers Association
- North American Fur Auctions, Canada
- North American Flyball Association
- Northern Areas Football Association

== Other ==
- Nuevo Acceso Ferroviario a Andalucía (New Rail Link to Andalusia), a high-speed rail link in Spain

== See also ==
- Nafa (disambiguation)
