= NIAF =

NIAF may stand for:

- Nigerian Institute of American Football, former governing body of American football in Nigeria
- National Italian American Foundation, an organisation to represent Italian Americans
