= Antonio Banks =

Antonio Banks may refer to:

- Montel Vontavious Porter (born 1973), American wrestler and rapper, also known as Antonio Banks
- Antonio Banks (American football) (born 1973), American football cornerback
