= Egypt national American football team =

Egypt مَصر

Home
- Association: EFAF
- Federation: Africa
- Founded: 2013
- Nickname: The Pharaohs
- IFAF Affiliation: 2014
- Colors: Red, white and black

First international
- Egypt 6–26 Morocco (Cairo, Egypt; 13 December 2014)

Biggest win
- None

Biggest defeat
- Egypt 6–26 Morocco (Cairo, Egypt; 13 December 2014)

The Egyptian Federation of American Football was founded in 2014. It was granted full membership by the IFAF in 2014. The EFAF is the country's top league, composed of 6 teams. The country's national team had its first match on 13 December 2014 against the Moroccan national team at the GUC stadium, for qualifications for the 2015 IFAF World Championship, and lost 26–6.

== History ==
=== Founding and membership of EFAF ===
The Egyptian Federation of American Football (EFAF) was founded in 2014 and is the governing body for the sport of American football in Egypt. It is responsible for all regulatory, competition, performance, and development aspects of the game. Egypt was granted full IFAF membership in the same year at the IFAF congress in Kuwait.

=== The Egyptian national team of American football ===
The country's official senior national men's football team is controlled by Egyptian League of American Football (ELAF) and is recognized by the International Federation of American Football (IFAF). The Egyptian League of American Football offers full-contact football in Egypt.

== The Egyptian League of American Football ==
=== Teams ===
ELAF comprises six teams: Cairo Sharks: Founding team, started in 2012 and the Pharaoh's bowl winner of 2013. Jersey colors: and

BUE Hawks: The British University in Egypt's team, started in 2014. Jersey colors: and

Cairo Lions: Started in 2014, the Cairo Lions are an independent team. Jersey colors: and

Cairo Mustangs: Started in 2013, and converted into an independent team in 2015. Jersey colors: and

BUE Bulls: British University in Egypt new team with name Bulls. Jersey colors:

Cairo Gorillas: A new team with the name Gorillas in 2015, which joined the ELAF starting in the 2016 season. Jersey colors: and

== Egyptian national team's IFAF World Championship record ==
Year	Position	GP	W	L	PF	PA
(Italy) 1999	Did not participate					
(Germany) 2003	Did not participate					
(Japan) 2007	Did not participate					
(Austria) 2011	Did not participate					
(United States) 2015	Did not qualify					
