= Nafa =

Nafa or NAFA may refer to:

- Nāfa, Okinawan for Naha, the capital city of the Okinawa Prefecture in Japan
- NAFA (disambiguation)
- Nafa, the local term for a subdistrict in Israel
- Nanyang Academy of Fine Arts (abbreviated as NAFA), secondary school located in Singapore

== People with the given name ==
- Nafa Urbach (born 1980), Indonesian soap opera actress and singer

== People with the surname ==
- Mohamed Nafa (1939–2021), Israeli Druze politician who served as a member of the Israeli Knesset
- Said Nafa or Said Naffaa (born 1953), Israeli Arab politician and lawyer, member of the Israeli Knesset
