= Botafogo Reptiles =

- Founded: 1999
- League: Carioca Bowl
- Team history: Botafogo Reptiles 1999–present
- Based in: Rio de Janeiro, Rio de Janeiro, Brazil
- Arena: Botafogo Beach (seating capacity: 0)
- Colors: green, black
- Championships: 5 (2002, 2003, 2004, 2005, 2008)

Uniforms
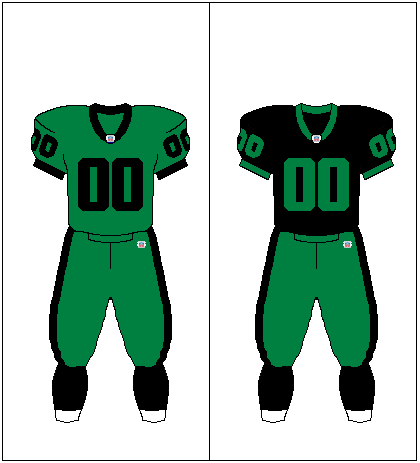

The Botafogo Reptiles is a Beach American football team based in Botafogo Beach, Rio de Janeiro, Brazil.

== History ==
Formed in 1999 by a group of friends in order to have fun, the Reptiles grew quickly and today is the most successful beach football team of the country. In the last eight state championships, the Reptiles reached all finals and became a 5-time champion in 2002, 2003, 2004, 2005, and 2008. The team went undefeated in three of the five titles.

Since its foundation until the end of the season 2006, the Reptiles preceded 76 matches (between championship matches and friendly matches), with a .836 win percecntage. There were 63 wins, 1 draw and 12 defeats. So far, the team was 1,543 points (20.3 per game) and has 403 points (5.3 per game). The best season was 2004, when, the Reptiles won all 17 games that preceded, with an average of 29 points scored and suffered only 2.5 per game.

In 2007, the Reptiles went through a period of restructuring, with the departure of several experienced players. Still, the team managed to reach another Carioca Bowl, but ended up being defeated by Copacabana Titãs. In 2008, the Reptiles became the champion again defeating the America Redlions by 10–0 and bringing the trophy back to Botafogo.
