= American football in Brazil =

Emerging sport in Brazil

American football has become a popular sport in Brazil since cable television made it possible for people to watch National Football League games. The main organization for American football in Brazil is the American Football Brazilian Confederation.

== Summary ==
Historically, American football games were played on sand, as to avoid the use of exported equipment from the United States of America and to reduce the impact of the tackles. The 2010s have seen most Brazilian states develop American football teams of various types; including flag football, tackle American football and women's football. A Brazilian Portuguese forum regarding American football was founded in 1998 in order to get more people watching the games on ESPN. As of 2013, there are 2500 Brazilian people who play American football. The first organized American football game between two Brazilian teams took place in 2008 when the Curitiba Brown Spiders took on the Barigui Crocodiles.

100 coaches from American high school and adult amateur teams have been sent to Brazil to teach aspiring coaches about the basics of American football.

Media attention traditionally given to Brazil on association football have been increased towards American football. Very little sponsorship money is given; as most money is tied into association football. Victor Menossi Rodrigues is one of the founders of the Brazilian "form" of American football after experimenting with boxing and judo. A significant number of female spectators are attracted to American football in Brazil; even to the point where they go to parties where the American football players pretend to speak English. Children between the ages of 8 and 13 are being encouraged by educational organizations to start participating in American football.

Other traditional fixtures in the Brazilian sports lifestyle like volleyball and Formula One are slowly losing their fanbase to American football. Once the game transitioned from sand to grass, the popularity of American football jumped. Players are only asked to practice occasionally and women have been embraced into even the "full contact" leagues. Copacabana Beach is considered to be the birthplace of American football in Brazil; where 20 men played the first game of American football in Brazilian history. All American football games not done on the beach are played out in public parks and teams must pay up to $300 to the municipality as rent. All Brazil had for equipment in 1989 was mouthguards from boxing rings and imported American footballs.
