= Antonio Banks (gridiron football) =

American gridiron football player and coach (born 1973)

No. 30
- Position: Cornerback

Personal information
- Born: March 12, 1973 (age 53); Ivor, Virginia, U.S.
- Listed height: 5 ft 10 in (1.78 m)
- Listed weight: 204 lb (93 kg)

Career information
- High school: Warwick (Newport News, Virginia)
- College: Virginia Tech
- NFL draft: 1997: 4th round, 113th overall pick

Career history

Playing
- Minnesota Vikings (1997–1998); → Amsterdam Admirals (1998); Winnipeg Blue Bombers (1998); Minnesota Vikings (1999–2000); → Amsterdam Admirals (2000); Frankfurt Galaxy (2000); Amsterdam Admirals (2001); Montreal Alouettes (2002); Winnipeg Blue Bombers (2003)

Coaching
- Alphen Eagles (2006) Head coach; Cairo Bears (2016–2017) Head coach; IMG Academy (2017–2022) Defensive back coach; IMG Academy (2017–2022) Defensive back coach; New Jersey Generals Secondary coach

Career NFL statistics
- Tackles: 30
- Fumble recoveries: 1
- Stats at Pro Football Reference

Antonio Dontral Banks (born March 12, 1973) is an American football coach and former cornerback. He played college football at Virginia Tech before playing in the National Football League (NFL) with the Minnesota Vikings.

== Playing career ==
Banks played college football at Virginia Tech where he was a letterman for all four years between 1993 and 1996 and was MVP of the 1993 Independence Bowl. He was drafted in the fourth round of the 1997 NFL draft with the 113th overall pick by the Minnesota Vikings where he played for four seasons. Banks also had several stints with multiple teams in NFL Europe and the Canadian Football League in his professional career.

== Coaching career ==
In 2006, Banks was the head coach of the Alphen aan den Rijn, Netherlands based Alphen Eagles of the European Football League. Later, he was hired as head coach of the Cairo Bears of the Egyptian Federation of American football in 2016. He joined IMG Academy in 2017 as the Defensive Back coach for their high school football program.
