= Carioca Bowl =

Beach American football league in Brazil

Carioca Bowl is a beach American football league based in Rio de Janeiro, Niterói and Saquarema, in the state of Rio de Janeiro, Brazil. The league's current champions are the America Red Lions.

== Teams ==
- América Red Lions - plays in Botafogo Beach in Botafogo borough^{1}
- Botafogo Reptiles - plays in Botafogo Beach in Botafogo borough
- Copacabana Eagles - plays in Copacabana Beach in Copacabana borough
- Copacabana Titãs - plays in Copacabana Beach in Copacabana borough
- Falcões - plays in Barra Beach in Barra da Tijuca borough
- Gladiadores
- Gorilas
- Guanabara Bay Buccanons
- Mamutes - plays in Barra Beach in Barra da Tijuca borough
- Niterói Corsários - plays in Niterói
- Niterói Warriors - plays in Icaraí Beach in Icaraí borough (Niterói)
- Piratas - plays in Copacabana Beach in Copacabana borough
- Pitbulls - plays in Barra Beach in Barra da Tijuca borough
- Rio de Janeiro Sharks - plays in Copacabana Beach in Copacabana borough
- Rio de Janeiro Tigers
- Saquarema Vikings - plays in Saquarema
- Tijuca Fênix - plays in Copacabana Beach in Copacabana borough^{2}
- Ilha Avalanche - plays in Ilha do Governador borough

== List of champions ==
=== Men ===
- 2000: Rio Guardians
- 2001: Copacabana Eagles
- 2002: Botafogo Reptiles
- 2003: Botafogo Reptiles
- 2004: Botafogo Reptiles
- 2005: Botafogo Reptiles
- 2006: Copacabana Titãs
- 2007: Copacabana Titãs
- 2008: Botafogo Reptiles
- 2009: America Red Lions
- 2010: America Red Lions
- 2011: Botafogo Reptiles
- 2012: Botafogo Reptiles
- 2013: Rio de Janeiro Sharks
- 2014: Rio de Janeiro Sharks
- 2015: Falcões
- 2016: Falcões
- 2017: Cabo Frio Rocks
- 2018:
- 2019: Cabo Frio Rocks
- 2020:
- 2021:
- 2022:
- 2023: Falcões
- 2024:

=== Women ===
- 2010: Vasco
- 2011: Vasco
- 2012: Fluminense Guerreiras

== Notes ==
- ^{1} The Red Lions are sponsored by the soccer club América Football Club.
- ^{2} The Fênix plays in Copacabana, but is based in Tijuca borough.
