= American Football Association of Nigeria =

Sports promotion and development group

American Football Association of Nigeria (NAFA)
- Founders: Babajide Akeredolu Seye Obatolu; Dominick Mueller Lawrence Ojaideh
- Type: Federation
- Registration no.: CAC/IT/NO151819
- Purpose: Flag Football, North American Football (Tackle), Referees & Coach Development
- Location: Lagos, Nigeria
- Region served: Nigeria
- Method: Capacity Building, League Development, Player Pathways, Sports Development
- Affiliations: IFAF; NFL; Nigeria School Sports Federation; Gridiron Imports
- Website: nafa.ng

The American Football Association of Nigeria, also known as the Nigerian American Football Association (NAFA), is a private organization involved in the promotion and developing American football in Nigeria.

Established in 2019, it is listed as an associated member of the International Federation of American Football (IFAF) representing Nigeria; however, it is not officially recognized by the Nigerian government as the national governing body for the sport.

== History ==
NAFA was founded in November 2019 by Babajide Akeredolu, along with co-founders Obatolu Oluwaseye, Dominik Mueller, and Lawrence Ojaideh, who serves as secretary general of the organization. The organization has stated that its activities include promoting participation in American football at the grassroots level, as well as initiatives related to education and community engagement.

== Activities and initiatives ==
The American Football Association of Nigeria (NAFA) has been associated with several initiatives aimed at developing American football in Nigeria.

NAFA organizes the Nigerian Secondary School Flag Football League (NSSFFL), a competition involving secondary school students from multiple states. The tournament provides opportunities for participation in flag football at the school level and has been described as part of broader efforts to introduce the sport to younger players.

The organization has also outlined plans related to the development of structured leagues within Nigeria, including proposals for regional competitions and expanded participation.

NAFA has supported initiatives promoting the inclusion of American football in educational and community settings as part of grassroots development efforts.

The NSSFFL includes a championship event known as the “Aketi Bowl”. One of its editions was held in Ondo State, where Government Secondary School, Eket, won the boys’ category. In this championship, Government Secondary School (GSS), Eket, Akwa Ibom State, emerged victorious in the boys' category by defeating Government Science Secondary School, Pyakasa, Abuja. wide.

== International participation ==
In June 2025, Nigeria’s men’s and women’s national flag football teams participated in the African Flag Football Tournament held in Cairo, Egypt, organized by the International Federation of American Football in partnership with NFL Africa.

According to reported results, both teams won their respective categories, with the women’s team defeating Morocco and the men’s team defeating Egypt in the final matches.

Participation in the tournament included players associated with domestic flag football programs, including the Community Flag Football League (CFFL). Preparatory activities reportedly included exhibition matches held prior to the tournament.

NAFA has also been associated with support initiatives aimed at increasing participation in the sport, including programs focused on women’s involvement. Following the tournament, Nigeria qualified to represent Africa at the 2026 IFAF World Championships.

== Recognition and impact ==
The American Football Association of Nigeria (NAFA) has been associated with activities related to the development of American football in Nigeria. Reports have indicated increased participation in flag football programmes linked to its initiatives, particularly at the school level.

The organization has engaged with international stakeholders, including the National Football League (NFL). As part of this association, player Jeff Okudah has been referenced as an ambassador connected to NAFA’s programmes.

In 2023, NAFA was invited to participate in the NFL Flag Championships held during the Pro Bowl, where it facilitated the involvement of an under-12 flag football team.

In June 2024, NAFA organized an under-14 NFL Flag tournament in Nigeria as part of NFL-related development activities. The event involved participation from schools in Lagos, Ogun, and Oyo states.
