= Egyptian Federation of American Football =

The Egyptian Federation of American Football (EFAF) is a league governing body of the sport of American Football in Egypt and is responsible for all regulatory, competitive, performance and development aspects of the game. EFAF was founded in December 2014 by three people: Abdelrahman Hafez, Ali Rafeek and Amr Hebbo.

EFAF currently has eight affiliated teams; with more than 800 registered individuals. The teams are: The Cairo Bears, The GUC Eagles, The Cairo Hellhounds, The MSA Tigers, The AUC Titans, The Cairo Wolves, The Cairo Warriors and The Gezira Thunder.

A Football Academy for all age groups was set-up for learning the basics of American Football.

== History ==
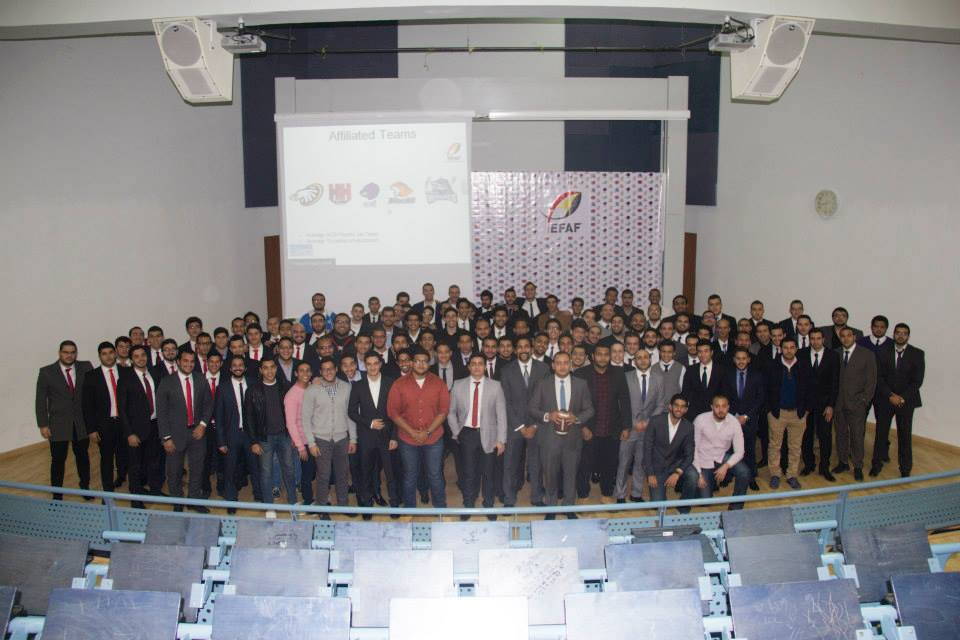
EFAF Members First Meeting

What started at the end of 2006 with a meeting among friends, progressed to four different teams being sponsored by Wadi Degla Sporting Clubs in 2010 and now has evolved to EFAF (Egyptian Federation of American Football).

EFAF was inaugurated mid-2014 and now bolsters eight different teams throughout Cairo and Gizah. Egyptian Football’s true start was on May 8, 2014 when the International Federation of American Football (IFAF) recognized football in Egypt by the attendance of the Vice Chair of IFAF Asia of the first fully equipped match in Egypt between The GUC Eagles and the Cairo Sharks. This visit was to establish the fact that Egypt will be an officially accepted member of the IFAF which in turn would mean that the national team that is to be chosen will be granted international status and the ability to compete in international events.

== Activities ==
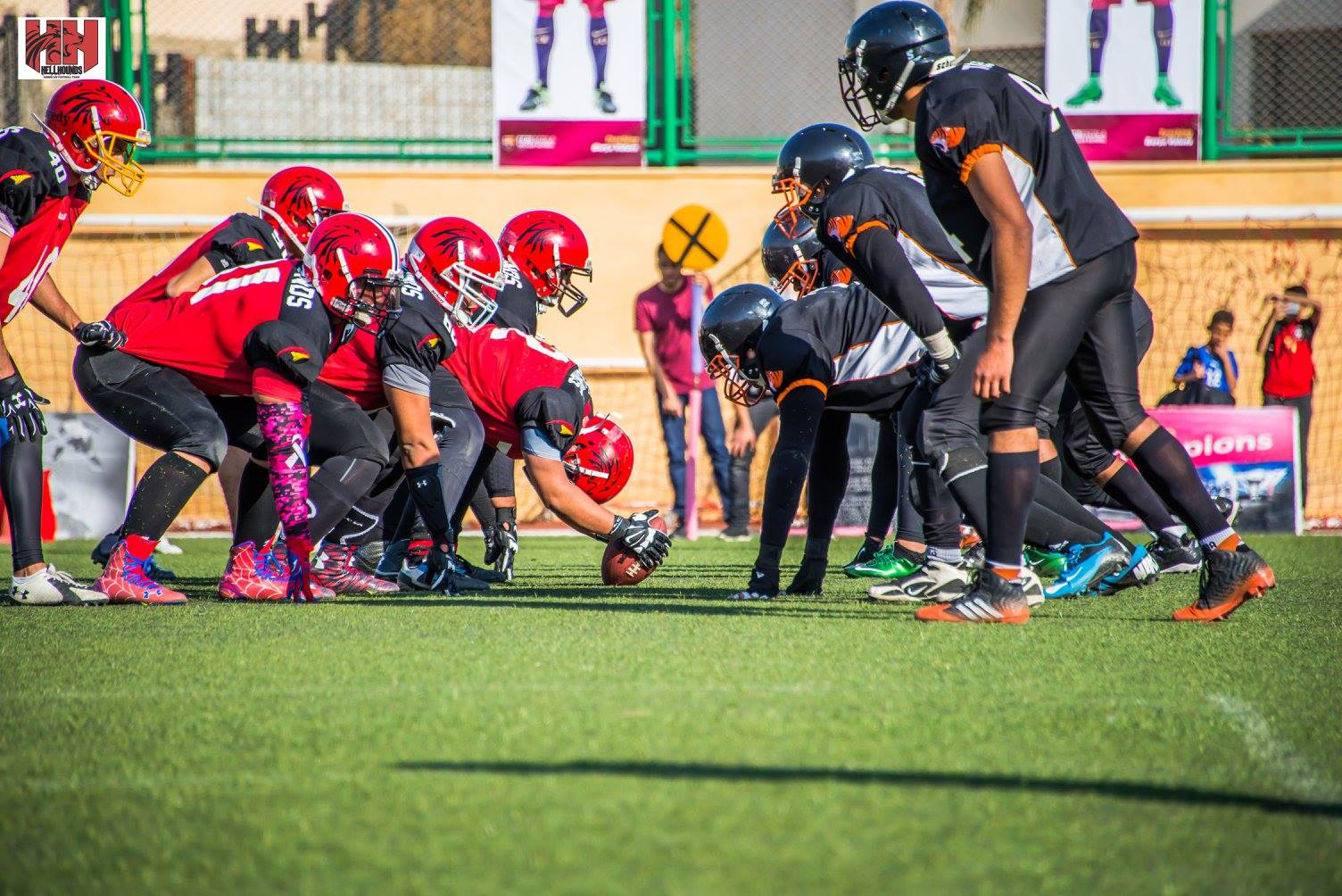
HellHounds vs Tigers

EFAF activities include the following:

- The organization and promotion of all amateur domestic national competitions across both contact and non-contact versions of the game.
- The organization and promotion of the Egyptian National Team in international competitions.
- The promotion of the game to people of all backgrounds and abilities and the provision of opportunities for their engagement and development.
- The regulation of the game on and off the field of play through oversight and enforcement of its rules.
- The representation of the interests of American Football in Egypt to national and international partners, whether sporting organizations, federations or commercial interests.

== Member Teams ==
- Cairo Bears
- GUC Eagles
- Cairo Hellhounds
- MSA Tigers
- AUC Titans
- Cairo Wolves
- Cairo Warriors
- Gezira Thunder

== Competitions ==
- Egyptian Flag Football League (EFFL)
- Egyptian National Football League (ENFL)
- Egyptian Bowl (EGBowl)
