= Nathan Havill =

American biologist (born 1972)

- Born: 1972
- Education: College of William & Mary (BS); University of Wisconsin–Madison (MS); Yale University (MS, PhD)
- Scientific career
- Fields: Entomology; Evolution; Population genetics; Ecology; Systematics; Phylogenetics; Taxonomy; Conservation biology; DNA sequencing
- Workplaces: Department of Ecology and Evolutionary Biology at Yale University; United States Forest Service

Nathan Peterson Havill (born 1972) is an American entomologist and evolutionary biologist. Havill is a Research Entomologist with the United States Forest Service in Hamden, Connecticut and is internationally recognized on the phylogeny of Adelgidae.

== Career ==
Since 1996 Havill has been a member of the Entomological Society of America. Since 2001, he has been a member of the Connecticut Entomological Society. Since 2012, he has been a member of the Society for the Study of Evolution.

His research focuses on the ecology and evolution of multi-trophic interactions and, in particular invasive pests, their natural enemies, and the impacted trees.

== Selected publications ==
- Havill, Nathan P.; Montgomery, Michael E.; Keena, Melody (2011). "Hemlock woolly adelgid and its hemlock hosts: a global perspective". Implementation and Status of Biological Control of the Hemlock Woolly Adelgid (PDF). Forest Health Technology Enterprise Team. pp. 3–14.
- Havill, Nathan P.; Shiyake, Shigehiko; Galloway, Ashley Lamb; Foottit, Robert G.; Yu, Guoyue; Paradis, Annie; Elkinton, Joseph; Montgomery, Michael E.; Sano, Masakazu; Caccone, Adalgisa (2016). "Ancient and modern colonization of North America by hemlock woolly adelgid, Adelges tsugae (Hemiptera: Adelgidae), an invasive insect from East Asia". Molecular Ecology. 25 (9): 2065–2080. Bibcode:2016MolEc..25.2065H. doi:10.1111/mec.13589. hdl:10919/97881. PMID 26880353. S2CID 32577303.
- Havill, Nathan P.; Gaimari, Stephen D.; Caccone, Adalgisa (2018). "Cryptic east-west divergence and molecular diagnostics for two species of silver flies (Diptera: Chamaemyiidae: Leucopis) from North America being evaluated for biological control of hemlock woolly adelgid". Biological Control. 121. Academic Press: 23–29. Bibcode:2018BiolC.121...23H. doi:10.1016/j.biocontrol.2018.02.004.
- Havill, Nathan; Cognato, Anthony; del-Val, Ek; Rabaglia, Robert; Garrick, Ryan C. (2019). "New Molecular Tools for Dendroctonus frontalis (Coleoptera: Curculionidae: Scolytinae) Reveal an East–West Genetic Subdivision of Early Pleistocene Origin". Insect Systematics and Diversity. 3 (2). Oxford University Press: 2. doi:10.1093/isd/ixz002.
- Andersen, Jeremy C.; Havill, Nathan P.; Caccone, Adalgisa; Elkinton, Joseph S. (2021). "Four times out of Europe: Serial invasions of the winter moth, Operophtera brumata, to North America". Molecular Ecology. 30 (14): 3439–3452. Bibcode:2021MolEc..30.3439A. doi:10.1111/mec.15983. PMID 34033202. S2CID 234212289.
- Gaimari, Stephen D.; Havill, Nathan P. (2021). "A new genus of Chamaemyiidae (Diptera: Lauxanioidea) predaceous on Adelgidae (Hemiptera), with a key to chamaemyiid species associated with Pinaceae-feeding Sternorrhyncha". Zootaxa. 5067 (1): 1–39. doi:10.11646/zootaxa.5067.1.1. PMID 34810763.
- Havill, Nathan P.; Griffin, Brian P.; Andersen, Jeremy C.; Foottit, Robert G.; Justesen, Mathias J.; Caccone, Adalgisa; D'Amico, Vincent; Elkinton, Joseph S. (2021). "Species delimitation and invasion history of the balsam woolly adelgid, Adelges (Dreyfusia) piceae (Hemiptera: Aphidoidea: Adelgidae), species complex". Systematic Entomology. 46 (1): 186–204. Bibcode:2021SysEn..46..186H. doi:10.1111/syen.12456. S2CID 226336413.
- Schulz, Ashley N.; Mech, Angela M.; Ayres, Matthew P.; Gandhi, Kamal J. K.; Havill, Nathan P.; Herms, Daniel A.; Hoover, Angela M.; Hufbauer, Ruth A.; Liebhold, Andrew M.; Marsico, Travis D.; Raffa, Kenneth F.; Tobin, Patrick C.; Uden, Daniel R.; Thomas, Kathryn A. (2021). "Predicting non-native insect impact: focusing on the trees to see the forest". Biological Invasions. 23 (12): 3921–3936. doi:10.1525/bio.2010.60.11.5. S2CID 28154739.
- Havill, Nathan P.; Dickson, Stephen M.; Kanoti, Allison; Parisio, Michael S.; Weimer, Jennifer; Zembrzuski, Deanna (2022). "Mass deposition of hemlock woolly adelgid sexuparae on New England beaches" (PDF). Journal of the Acadian Entomological Society. 18: 14–17.
- Dial, Dustin T.; Weglarz, Kathryn M.; Aremu, Akintunde O.; Havill, Nathan P.; Pearson, Taylor A.; Burke, Gaelen R.; von Dohlen, Carol D. (2022). "Transitional genomes and nutritional role reversals identified for dual symbionts of adelgids (Aphidoidea: Adelgidae)". The ISME Journal. 16 (3): 642–654. Bibcode:2022ISMEJ..16..642D. doi:10.1038/s41396-021-01102-w. PMC 8857208. PMID 34508228.
