= Leo Dee =

American painter (1931–2004)

- Born: July 8, 1931; Newark, New Jersey, U.S.
- Died: November 22, 2004 (aged 73); Truro, Massachusetts
- Known for: Artist and teacher

Leo Dee (July 8, 1931—November 22, 2004) was an American artist and teacher. A native of Newark, New Jersey, he achieved first regional and then national prominence for his "incredibly detailed" and realistic silverpoint drawings that conveyed "the softest and most subtle transitions of tonal values". (Note: In a Wall Street Journal article of September 11, 1985, Sandra Earley discussed the difficulty of the silverpoint technique, which she calls "a medium so demanding that artists turn into virtual hermits, working months over one small drawing, building up tone and shadow with line after tiny, thin, precise line." She says Dee's drawings "seem almost photographic in their precision, yet there is a softness and vulnerability that raises them above photographic reproduction.")

== Early life and training ==
Dee was born in Newark, New Jersey, on July 8, 1931. He attended Newark Arts High School, graduating in 1950 with a three-year scholarship to attend the Newark School of Fine and Industrial Arts. Drafted into the U.S. Army in 1953, he served two years in Fort Meade and, returning to civilian life, re-entered the Newark School of Fine and Industrial Arts under the G.I. Bill. While a student at that school, he took classes from instructors who had established reputations in their respective fields, including Leopold Matzal (portrait painting), James Rosati and Reuben Nakian (sculpture), and Ben Cunningham (color theory). Among them were two artists associated with the precisionist movement whose teaching had lasting influence on Dee's mature style. One of the two, Charles Goeller, showed Dee how to create realistic drawings in fine detail, and the other, Hans Weingaertner, showed him how to make paintings having "precise and quiet form" and trompe l'oeil realism.

== Mature style ==
When Newark's Rabin & Krueger Gallery gave Dee his first solo exhibition in 1957, he was making paintings in an abstract style. However, impressed by the gallery's display of silverpoint drawings by Joseph Stella, he subsequently made a transition to an austere style in that medium.

In 1958, Dee was hired to teach life drawing at the Newark School of Fine and Industrial Arts and soon thereafter a collage drawing of his became the first of his works to be purchased by a major museum. This piece, Self-Portrait, revealed his skill in a trompe l'oeil technique by which he was able to give an appearance of collage by precise application of very fine lines. A critic for the New York Times wrote that the self-portrait was a "haunting image" having "great formal and emotional power." (Note: The critic was John Caldwell, reviewing an exhibition that also featured works by Reginald Marsh, Moses, Raphael Soyer, and Joseph Stella. He said that Dee's self-portrait was one of the finest in the show and that he wished there were more of his drawings on view.) The technique soon became Dee's dominant style of drawing. A few years later, when the Newark Museum showed this drawing along with another called Reflections in White, critics remarked on the "superrealism" that he achieved, his "staggering technical perfection," and an apparent "intense concern for truth and purity." (Note: The show was called Forms in Contemporary Art (1963). The critics were Michael Lenson, writing in the Newark Sunday News; Donald Malafronte in the Newark Star-Ledger; and John Canaday in the New York Times.) This technique shows up in a silverpoint drawing he made in 1964 called Musician.

Leo Dee, Fringed Drapery, 2003, silverpoint on paper, 40.6 x 30.5 cm., Museum of Fine Arts, Boston

In 1966, a drawing of Dee's appeared in a touring exhibition of 100 drawings sponsored by the American Federation of Arts. Reviewing the show for the New York Times, Grace Glueck, singled out a drawing called Death and Transfiguration as one of her two favorites. (Note: The exhibition was sponsored by a New York art organization called the Drawing Society, which had selected its contents from among a large number of submissions received from regional centers around the United States. As well as the one by Dee, the 100 drawings in the show included works by Isabel Bishop, Edwin Dickinson, Leonard Baskin, James Rosenquist, Henry C. Pearson, Roy Lichtenstein, and Fritz Glarner. Glueck wrote, "This viewer's favorites were two small-format drawings that seemed to work down to the nub of each artist's style: Larry Zox's delicately colored crayon and pencil abstraction, Untitled, 1964, and Leo J. Dee's pencil drawing of a withering apple half, Death and Transfiguration.") A few years later, the art gallery at Yale University purchased Paper Landscape, a silverpoint drawing that the authors of an art book describe as "a contemporary handling of the trompe l'œil technique where verisimilitude is the goal." (Note: The authors say, "A torn segment of an envelope is realistically rendered; an isolated detail of the crumpled paper emerges from the blank picture plane. By the title, Paper Landscape, we are given directions to interpret the drawing as a metaphorical stand-in for a landscape. Careful control of the tool, silverpoint on prepared board, and a concentrated observation result in a trick-the-eye texture.") In 1975, Dee was given a solo exhibition at the Coe Kerr Gallery, New York. The show brought together some of his paintings and reliefs as well as the silverpoint drawings for which he had achieved recognition. Writing in the New York Times, a critic admired the painstaking still-life draftsmanship of the drawings and said the other work was "unlikely to make history." Three years later, the New Jersey State Museum displayed twenty-seven of his drawings and two masonite reliefs in a show held in the main gallery. A reviewer noted that Dee made his subjects "come alive," eliminating superfluous elements and rendering them with great realism. "The viewer," she wrote, "is not merely getting a detailed rendition of the object but also a feeling for the essence of that object… Though incredibly detailed, Dee's work is very modern in its approach." (Note: The critic was Rachel Mullen, who was writing in a local paper, the Warren Township Echoes-Sentinel. The article contains a more comprehensive appreciation of Dee's work than appeared in other news accounts.)

During the 1980s and 1990s, Dee's drawings appeared in group exhibitions in New Jersey museums and galleries, and critics continued to praise their fine draftsmanship and meticulous realism. His silverpoint work won praise as well for its "softness and spirituality." In 1978, a critic wrote that "Dee can make a piece of drapery come alive and can make you feel the sensuous curves of an apple, a pear, or a lemon, or the mystery of the spiral chamber of a conch shell" and, the same year, he himself commented on this quality in his art. "In my drawings," he wrote, "I strive for elegance and a quality of magic. With a large, open portion of the surface, I seek to create a special universe for each object, giving it a life of its own. Finding human characteristics in a pear or lemon, viewing landscapes in a crumpled piece of paper, I try to evoke the feeling that all of nature is one." (Note: The statement appeared in the exhibition catalog that accompanied the solo exhibition of Dee's drawings and reliefs in the main gallery of the Trenton State Museum in 1978.) In 2015, his silverpoint drawing, Paper Landscape, c. 1972, was exhibited in a group show at the National Gallery of Art and noted for its microscopic precision.

== Art teacher ==
In 1958, Dee was appointed as an instructor of drawing and painting at the Newark School of Fine & Industrial Art. He later became the school's principal instructor of realistic drawing, retiring in 1993. Thereafter he taught evening classes at the Visual Arts Center of New Jersey in Summit, N.J. and was periodically a visiting instructor at Seton Hall University in South Orange, N.J.

== Personal information ==
Dee was born on July 8, 1931, in Newark, New Jersey. His parents were Leo J. Dee and Elenor K. Dee. (Note: Details about Dee's parentage and early life are given in "Leo Dee (1931–2004)," by David B. Dearinger, which appeared first in 2005 in the "Resource Library" section of the home page of the Boston Athenæum and which was taken from the catalog of an exhibition held in 2005 called Power Line: The Art of Leo Dee, held February 18 through April 30, 2005, at the Boston Athenæum. The article says that the name of Dee's maternal grandmother was Elenita, Roloff Kennedy, making it probable that his mother's maiden name was Kennedy.) It is suggested that his maternal grandmother, an artist who had attended the predecessor of the school where Dee learned and later taught art, influenced his decision to become an artist himself.

In 1963, Dee married the art historian and museum curator Elaine Evans. She had previously been married to William H. Gerdts, the author of an essay on Dee that appeared in the catalog for Dee's solo show at the Coe Kerr Gallery in 1975.

In 1993, Dee retired from his teaching position at the Newark School of Fine and Industrial Arts, and three years later, after short-term, part-time teaching stints in northern New Jersey, he and Elaine Evans moved permanently to Truro, Massachusetts, a village on Cape Cod where they had previously spent summer vacations. There, he continued to make silverpoint drawings using elements in the local landscape for his subjects. He died in Truro on November 22, 2004.

Other names

As his professional name, Dee used Leo Dee or sometimes Leo J. Dee. When young, he was known as Leo J. Dee, Jr. His friends and family called him Joe Dee.

== Exhibitions ==
During the 1970s and 1980s, Dee exhibited frequently in New Jersey galleries and museums and occasionally, as well, in New York. This list is representative, not comprehensive. It comes from art web sites, galleries, a book, and many news accounts.

- 1957 solo, Rabin & Krueger, Newark, New Jersey
- 1957 group, "New Talents," Newark Foam Rubber Center, Newark, New Jersey
- 1959 group, Newark Museum, New Jersey
- 1963 group, "Forms in Contemporary Art," Newark Museum, New Jersey
- 1964 group, traveling exhibition of contemporary American drawings
- 1966 group, "Yesterday and Tomorrow," Mark of the Phoenix Gallery, New York
- 1966 group, "Meticulous Realism," Tawes Art Center, University of Maryland, College Park, Maryland
- 1966 group, "Art From New Jersey," New Jersey State Museum, Trenton
- 1966 group, "100 contemporary drawings," Drawing Society and American Federation of Arts, New York
- 1967 group, "Geometric Art: An Exhibition of Paintings and Constructions by Fourteen Contemporary New Jersey Artists," New Jersey State Museum, Trenton
- 1970 group, "Fourth Invitational Painting and Sculpture Exhibition," Van Deusen Gallery, Kent State University
- 1975 solo, retrospective exhibition, Coe Kerr Gallery, New York
- 1978 solo, "29 Drawings by Leo Dee," New Jersey State Museum, Trenton
- 1979 solo, "The Art of Leo Dee," New Jersey State Museum, Trenton
- 1980 group, "New Jersey Masters, 1980," Gill/St. Bernard's School, Gladstone, New Jersey
- 1981 group, Kean College Art Gallery, Union, New Jersey
- 1982 group, "The accessible joys of American still life," touring exhibition
- 1982 group, Coe Kerr Gallery, New York
- 1984 group, "B Orwell's '1984' Interpreted By New Jersey Artists," Newark Museum, New Jersey
- 1985 group, "Fifth New Jersey Artists Biennial," Newark Museum, New Jersey
- 1985 group, "The Fine Line," Norton Museum of Art, West Palm Beach, Florida
- 1991 group, "102 Prints," Newark Public Library, Newark, New Jersey
- 1991 group, "11th New Jersey Arts Annual Exhibition," Montclair Art Museum, Montclair, New Jersey
- 1992 group, "Aspects of Realism," Trenton State Museum, Trenton
- 1994 group, "More Than Meets the Eye," Morris Museum, Morristown, New Jersey
- 1998 group, "For Beauty and for Truth: The William and Abigail Gerdts Collection of American Still Life," Berry-Hill Galleries, New York
- 2005 solo, "Power Line: The Art of Leo Dee," Boston Athenæum, Boston, Massachusetts
- 2015 group, "Drawing in Silver and Gold: Leonardo to Jasper Johns," National Gallery of Art, Washington, D.C.

== Collections ==
This list is representative, not comprehensive. It comes from art web sites and museums.

- Columbus Museum, Columbus, Ohio
- Cooper-Hewitt Museum, N.Y.
- Fannie E. Rippel Foundation, Newark, N.J.
- Fogg Museum, Harvard University, Cambridge, Mass.
- Hunter Museum of American Art, Chattanooga, Tenn.
- New Jersey State Museum, Trenton, N.J.
- Newark Museum, Newark, N.J.
- Philadelphia Museum of Art, Philadelphia, Penn.
- Springfield Museum of Art, Springfield, Mass.
- Utah Museum of Fine Arts, Salt Lake City, Utah
- Yale University Art Gallery, New Haven, Conn.
