= O. K. Sato =

O. K. Sato (March 13, 1871 - March 23, 1921) was an American vaudeville performer who was active in the late nineteenth and early twentieth centuries. His act was notable for its juggling of the comedic style and was an early use of the so-called "tramp" juggling style popularized by W. C. Fields. In fact, Sato and Fields are known from Fields' surviving correspondence to have maintained a relationship in which the two traded gossip and ideas for their acts.

== Biography ==
He was born as Frederick L. Steinbrucker on March 13, 1871, in Trenton, New Jersey. He was one of four children of Karl Gottfried Steinbrücker, a German national, who was born in the town of Kleineutersdorf in Thuringia. Gottfried, with his wife Wilhelmina Senf, emigrated to Trenton, New Jersey, where he worked as a cigar maker.

Sato began his career at Coney Island and met his wife, Marguerite Wartenburg, an aerialist while touring in Europe. They were married in 1896.

After Sato retired from the stage he was a real estate developer in Irvington, New Jersey, where he died suddenly of a heart attack on Wednesday, March 23, 1921.
