= W. Carl Burger =

German-born American Artist

- Born: Werner Carl Burger; December 27, 1925; Pforzheim, Baden, Germany
- Died: February 21, 2023 (aged 97); Stewartsville, New Jersey, United States
- Citizenship: United States
- Education: New York University
- Occupations: Artist; professor; academic

Werner Carl Burger (December 27, 1925 – February 21, 2023) was a German-born American Abstract Expressionist painter. "Although the forms of his paintings are often abstract, Burger maintains a link to the 'real' world in almost all of his paintings through a jubilant, vibrant, and semi-representational domain."

As a lifetime artist and winner of numerous major awards, Burger is listed in Who's Who in American Art. Burger's works are held in collections at the Butler Institute of American Art Museum, the Budapest Museum of fine Arts, the Morris Museum, the Noyes Museum of Art, the New Jersey State Museum, Newark Museum, and the Princeton University Art Museum, as well as various corporate and private collections.

Notably, one of Burger's large watercolors, Jersey Shore, Brielle, hangs in the New Jersey Governor's mansion, depicting a scene at the Jersey Shore, and is one of only two contemporary works at Drumthwacket, and prior to his death, the only work by a living artist.

== Early life ==
Burger was born in Pforzheim, Baden, Germany to Carl Frederick Burger and Helen Rosalie Burger. His father, a professional jeweler and diamond setter, decided to move their family to America due to the decline of the local jewelry industry. In 1926, at ten-months old, Burger emigrated with his family to the United States, settling in Irvington, New Jersey.

At age 14, when hostilities erupted between Germany and the United States, Burger was declared an enemy alien and fingerprinted, since his father hadn't obtained citizenship at the time.

Burger became interested in art at an early age, designing and creating sets for marionettes, supported by his mother's encouragement of his "artistic" passions. He continued to pursue his interest in theater, working as an usher and set designer until his intended matriculation to New York University in 1944.

=== Military service ===
Six weeks after enrolling in New York University, Burger was drafted into the United States Army, stationed at Fort Dix for basic training. After basic training, Burger was assigned to the 1651st Engineers Utility Detachment and deployed to the European Theater guarding the refrigeration tunnels in Cherbourg, France. Shortly before the Battle of the Bulge, due to his bi-lingual upbringing and fluency in German, Burger was transferred to a Military Intelligence unit stationed in Munich, Germany where he served under Hans Habe.

While stationed in Germany, Burger had an opportunity to return to Pforzheim, the decimated German city of his birth. Burger later memorialized his time in Pforzheim in four large format works displayed during his exhibit, W. Carl Burger: The Urge to Paint, at the Morris Museum in 2016.

Burger became a naturalized citizen of the United States during his service, and received an honorable discharge in 1946.

=== Education ===
Upon his discharge from the Army, Burger immediately returned home to continue his education at New York University, where he received his Bachelor of Science and Master of Arts degrees in Fine Arts Education, graduating in 1948 from the NYU Steinhardt School of Culture, Education, and Human Development. Burger presented his Master's thesis on "Animal Forms in Mayan Art", driving his interest in the visual history of mankind, archaeology, and anthropology. In addition to his degrees from New York University, Burger completed graduate work at Columbia University, the Art Students League, and Rutgers University.

== Artistic career ==
Since the age of fifteen, Burger has created more than 700 oil paintings, watercolors, collages and drawings, exploring different subjects and styles over his more than 80 year love of art.

Burger's love of art was inspired by a classroom visit to his grammar school from a puppeteer, driving his first interest in set design and staging. In high school, one of Burger's teachers invited Maurice King to do a watercolor demonstration for the class, instilling in Burger a focus of the medium.

During his time as a soldier in Europe, Burger would spend time creating artwork inspired by French landscapes or European architecture, continuing his artistic development throughout his military career.

As Burger continued his education after World War II, he found additional inspiration from the likes of George Innes, John Kensett, Charles Burchfield, and Matta, and was eventually befriended and mentored by Adolph Konrad and Meyer Rohosky.

In parallel with his career as an art educator, Burger's passion as an artist continued, exploring new mediums and styles throughout his life. In the 1950s Burger had the opportunity to work as a set designer in New York, where he designed sets for Shelley Winters, Anthony Franciosa, Ethel Waters, and Jeffrey Lynn.

In 1960, Burger was awarded the Bamburger Exhibition of Contemporary New Jersey Art Award, presented to him by renowned artist Marcel Duchamp. Throughout the 1960s, Burger continued his focus on nature and landscapes through his use of watercolor. By the 1970s, he turned to studying architectural forms, using pencil to draw a series of buildings using straight lines, in contrast to the natural forms of his previous work.

One of Burger's notable architectural drawings is Children's Fantasies, 1975, which features an airship floating above a Cubist-style house where the inside and outside blend together.

Some of Burger's architectural drawings, especially those of churches, appear to carry political inspiration. Burger's Forget About Divine Intervention, 1981, portrays a church overrun by weeds, representing his views on the Catholic Church's ban on abortion.

Burger considered his most prolific years between the 1960s and 1990s, where he was inspired and encouraged by three soulmates. Peter Jones often allowed Burger to spend many hours in his frame shop, where much of Burger's Papal Series were conceived. Elizabeth Collins and Henrietta Palmer were the initial "angels" in the series.

In the 1990s and early 2000s Burger took much of his inspiration from Russell Hosp's farm in Stockton, New Jersey, where Russ's drive and interest in Burger's work spurred on some of his large watercolors.

During his career, Burger exhibited pieces throughout the United States, including the Lincoln Center and the National Academy of Design in New York, the Philadelphia Museum of Art, the Smithsonian Institution in Washington, D.C., the Newark Museum, the Montclair Museum, the New Jersey State Museum, and the Morris Museum. Burger also had several international exhibits, Budapest and Germany.

Over his lifetime as an artist, Burger was the subject of several NJN Public Television Documentary's, in 2009 "State of the Arts", in 2016 "Urge to Paint", which was nominated for a 2021 Mid-Atlantic Regional Emmy Award, and in 2021 "W. Carl Burger: A Painter's Life". He was also featured in "New Jersey Artists Through Time" a book by Tova Navarra 2014. and "Artists of the River Towns: Their Works and Their Stories, Vol. 1" a book by Dorris Brandes.

Burger has noted corporate collections including British Airways, Warner Communications, American Telephone and Telegraph, Johnson & Johnson, Nabisco World Headquarters, Schering-Plough, Ortho Pharmaceuticals, Lockheed Electronics (with Meyers Rohowsky) and many private collections.

== Teaching career ==
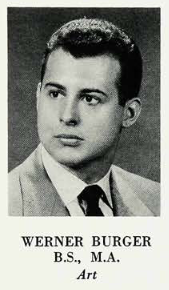
Yearbook Photo of Art Teacher W. Carl Burger, Westfield, New Jersey, 1955

Burger began as an art teacher at Neptune High School in Ocean Grove, New Jersey soon after completing his schooling. He eventually accepting a position at the Westfield Senior High School in Westfield, New Jersey in 1951. Throughout his time at Westfield Senior High School (1951–1958) Burger brought his love of art to his students through frequent exhibitions of their work and workshops instructing in watercolors.

Burger's love of set design re-emerged during his early teaching career, and during the 1950s he collaborated with the schools theater department and music department to set up a lighting plan that conveyed the mood of the music in combination with the backgrounds. During his summers Burger worked as a set designer for the Cape May Playhouse, Cape May, New Jersey.

In 1961, Burger took a position as an Associate Professor of the Fine Arts departments at Kean University, formerly known as the Newark State College. He remained a professor at the University until his retirement in 1993. Burger continued to take an active role in the art program at Kean University as a Professor Emeritus, showcasing several solo exhibits, and establishing the Karl and Helen Burger art gallery on campus, named for his parents.

Additionally, Burger was an adjunct professor at the County College of Morris, and hosted many lectures and art demonstrations at art associations throughout New Jersey and Pennsylvania during his lifetime.

== Awards ==
This is a partial list of awards Burger received for his work

- 1st Prize, Watercolor - Westfield Art Association 32nd Annual Exhibition, Bury Me in Driving Rain, 1957
- Rabin and Krueger Award,1st Prize, Watercolor - Westfield Art Association 34th Annual Exhibition, To Dusk, Dawn, and Death, 1959
- Bamburger Exhibition of Contemporary New Jersey Art Award, 1960
- Jocelyn Museum Award at the Ball State University Annual Drawing Show, Office of Higher Education
- 1st Prize, 1974 State Show at Bernardsville, Gluteus Maximus, 1974
- Grumbacher Award for Outstanding Service to the Arts, 1980
- New Jersey State Council on the Arts Grant, 1980
- New Jersey Master Artist Award presented by the County College of Morris, 2016
- Audubon Artists Gold Medal of Honor, Fantastic Landscapes, 2017
- New Jersey Water Color Society Patrons' Award for Drawing, Pastel, or Printmaking, Russ Hosp's Treasures, 2018
- Audubon Artists Honorary John Angelini Memorial Award in Watercolor, Reawakening, 2019

== Exhibitions ==
This is a partial list of known exhibitions of Burger's work, either as a solo exhibit or group exhibit

- W. Carl Burger - Paper Mill Playhouse Galleries, November 13, 1954 - November 28, 1954
- 28th Annual New Jersey State Exhibition - Montclair Art Museum, November 11, 1959 - December 6, 1959
- Associated Artists of New Jersey - Visual Arts Center of New Jersey, March 22, 1964 - April 12, 1964
- W. Carl Burger, a retrospective - The Morris Museum, October 2, 2001 - January 13, 2002
- Mixed Bag - Newark Academy's Elizabeth McGraw Arts Center, September 2006
- New Jersey Landscapes - Rider University Art Gallery, January 25, 2007 - February 22, 2007
- W. Carl Burger - The Butler Institute of American Art, May 6, 2007 - June 24, 2007
- The Nature of W. Carl Burger - Noyes Museum of Art, January 18, 2008 - May 9, 2008
- The Essential W. Carl Burger - Kean University, November 10, 2008 - January 15, 2009
- Faculty Exhibition Series: W. Carl Burger - Visual Arts Center of New Jersey, January 29, 2009 - March 3, 2009
- W. Carl Burger: Artist as Curator and Selected Works - New Jersey State Museum, August 5, 2011 - October 16, 2011
- W. Carl Burger: Drawing for Fifty Years - Kean University, April 24, 2012 - July 19, 2012
- New Jersey Impressions - The Drumthwacket Foundation, September 2014 - July 2014
- On Your Radar? Regional Abstractionists to Watch and Collect - The Trenton City Museum at Ellarsie, September 19, 2015 - November 8, 2015
- W. Carl Burger: The Urge to Paint - The Morris Museum, February 18, 2016 - March 27, 2016
- W. Carl Burger Solo Art Exhibition - CCM Art and Design Gallery, October 23, 2016 - January 20, 2017
- Spheres of Influence: W. Carl Burger - The Morris Museum, June 18, 2018 - August 19, 2018
- W. Carl Burger and James Kearns curated by Wes Sherman - The Center for Contemporary Art, January 17, 2020 - February 29, 2020
- W. Carl Burger: Mastery of the Medium - The Morris Museum, July 14, 2020 - November 1, 2020
