= Charles Goeller =

American painter (1901–1955)

- Charles Goeller, self portrait, "How Does It Feel to be a Piece of Paper?" (crayon on paper, 15 in × 12 in, 380 mm × 300 mm)
- Born: Charles Louis Goeller; November 10, 1901; Irvington, New Jersey, U.S.
- Died: March 6, 1955 (aged 53); Elizabeth, New Jersey, U.S.

Charles Goeller (1901–1955) was an American artist best known for precise and detailed paintings and drawings in which, he once said, he aimed to achieve "emotion expressed by precision." (Note: Goeller made the statement to an interviewer in 1953. The quote appeared in an article in the Newark Sunday News of June 28, 1953. The article is cited in a critical essay within an art exhibition catalog, Emotion Expressed Through Precision: The Art of Charles Goeller (New York, N.Y.: Gallery, 2003). The essay was by Gail Stavitsky. The exhibition was held at three New York galleries: Gallery, Franklin Riehlman Fine Art, and Megan Moynihan Fine Art. Gallery is the name of a gallery, now called Gallery Schlesinger, on 24 East 73rd Street, Manhattan.) Employing, as one critic wrote, an "exquisitely meticulous realism," he might take a full year to complete work on a single picture. Early in his career he achieved critical recognition for his still lifes, in which one critic saw an "acumen of genius" working to produce "truly superb achievement of team work between eyes that see and hands that do." Later, he also became known for cityscapes in which he employed precisionist flat planes and geometric forms to show the physical structures of his subjects.

== Art training ==
Goeller's father and grandfather were structural engineers who ran a successful iron and steel fabricating plant in Newark, New Jersey. Upon graduating from high school Goeller studied mathematics, civil engineering, and architecture first at Rensselaer Polytechnic Institute and later at Cornell University. Afterwards his grandfather agreed to support five years of art and architecture study in France. Beginning in 1923 he received art instruction from Jean Despujols and other members of the faculty at the École Américaine de Fontainebleau. During this period Goeller also studied at Académie de la Grande Chaumière, a small left-bank atelier in Paris.

== Art career, 1930s ==
Charles Goeller, "Checked Tablecloth," oil on canvas, 40 in × 25 in (1,020 mm × 640 mm)

After his return to the United States Goeller joined the young American artists associated with the Daniel Gallery located on Madison Avenue in New York. In March 1929 the gallery included his work in an exhibition that also included paintings by Peter Blume, Preston Dickinson, Elsie Driggs, Karl Knaths, and Yasuo Kuniyoshi. (Note: The Daniel Gallery had opened in 1913. Run by Charles Daniel, with help from Alanson Hartpence, it showed the work of young American artists such as Marsden Hartley, John Marin, Rockwell Kent, Maurice Prendergast, and Man Ray. One of the relatively few galleries that showed art by women, it had a stable of artists that included many of Katherine Schmidt's friends from the Art Students League and Whitney Studio Club.) Reviewing the show, critics called attention to a still life of his called "Checkered Tablecloth." One remarked on the high quality of the work and pointed out that the cloth "drapes itself cunningly," another noted his "meticulous technique" and "vibrating color," and a third saw in it a tendency toward Neues Sachlichkeit. (Note: The still life was first shown in 1928 at the Société du Salon d'Automne, Paris. Subsequent to the Daniel Gallery show it appeared in 1930 at the Museum of Modern Art ("46 Painters and Sculptors Under 35 Years of Age") and in Goeller's one-man show at the Argent Gallery.) (Note: The term Neues Sachlichkeit is said to be difficult to define. It seems generally agreed that the style evolved as an extension to Expressionism, that aimed to achieve a "magic naturalism" through a precise matter-of-factness. Magic naturalism, also called magic realism, has been defined as post-expressionist style that, in opposition to abstraction and emotionally charged imagery, was characterized by ultrasharp focus in depicting "the autonomy of the objective world" and "the wonder of matter" in such a way that objects would be "seen anew." The quoted text appears in Lois Parkinson Zamora and Wendy B. Faris, eds., Magical Realism: Theory, History, Community (Durham and London: Duke University Press, 1995))

The following year the same still life appeared in a group exhibit at the Museum of Modern Art. Called "Forty-six Painters and Sculptors Under Thirty-One Years of Age," it contained an international mix of art by younger artists, including many whose careers would later flourish. (Note: In addition to Goeller, the American artists in this show included Peggy Bacon, Peter Blume, Alexander Brook, Elsie Driggs, Arshile Gorky, Stefan Hirsch, Luigi Lucioni, Reginald Marsh, Marjorie Phillips, and Ben Shahn.) One critic for the New York Times, Elisabeth Luther Cary, praised the painting as "a truly superb achievement of team work between eyes that see and hands that do" and another Times critic, Edward Alden Jewell, said his still life, with its "fabric wizardry," was attracting much attention. The same year Jewell commented on "Blue Brocade," a still life of Goeller's included in a group show at the Daniel Gallery. Calling it "sumptuous" and "ravishing," he said its virtuosity made it comparable to the work of early-Renaissance goldsmiths and concluded: "Here, once more, in this expert solution of a painter's problem, the centuries become but as a day."

In a paper read at the College Art Association meeting in 1931 Alfred H. Barr cited Goeller as one of a group of young Americans whom he called "New Objectivists." (Note: The others mentioned by Barr were Reginald Marsh, Charles Burchfield, Peter Blume, Stefan Hirsch, Luigi Lucioni and Katherine Schmidt.) (Note: Founded in 1911, the College Art Association aimed to establish art and art history as subjects for academic study. It has accomplished this objective through conferences, standards-setting, sponsored exhibitions, and the publication of influential journals, including Art Bulletin, Parnassus, and Art Journal.) (Note: The term New Objectivity was a common translation of Neues Sachlichkeit.) A year later Goeller exhibited work in a show called "American Scenes and Subjects" put on by the College Art Association at the Rehn Gallery. (Note: Frank Knox Morton Rehn (1886-1956), son of the artist Frank Knox Morton Rehn (1848-1914), founded the gallery in 1918. Although its official name was the Frank K. M. Rehn Galleries, it was often called the Rehn Gallery or simply Rehn's. Goeller was not represented by the gallery and apparently only showed there on this one occasion.) Reviewing a group exhibition at the Daniel Gallery in 1931, a critic referred to Goeller and the show's other artists as practitioners of "pure painting." By this he meant the group focused the experience of the observer. He said the artists aimed to draw the viewer's attention to "what lies beyond or beneath or above." Another reviewer of that show said one of Goeller's paintings in the exhibition was "a good illustration of the modern use of color as an integral part of the expression form." In 1933 Goeller showed still lifes, figure studies, and landscapes in a solo exhibition at Argent Gallery. In reviewing the show, Howard Devree of the New York Times said Goeller had made a "very commendable achievement." He praised the still lifes for his outstanding use of color and the remarkable fabric textures he was able to achieve, but felt the figure studies were not maturely realized and the landscapes overly flat. (Note: The Argent Galleries were located in the headquarters building of the National Association of Women Painters and Sculptors on West 57th Street. Founded in 1930, they were mainly used to show work by the group's members, but, in between these shows, they were made available for outsiders' use, particularly one-man exhibitions such as Goeller's.)

Charles Goeller, "Third Avenue," oil on canvas, 36 in × 30 1/8 in (910 mm × 770 mm)

Having achieved critical recognition for his still lifes in the early 1930s, Goeller painted a larger number of landscapes during the middle and late years of the decade. After joining the Public Works of Art Project, he painted the highly regarded "Third Avenue" in 1934. In a style that was identified as precisionist, this painting used geometric forms and flat planes to emphasize "the scale and power of modern technology," according to a biographer, Following his employment in the Public Works of Art Project, Goeller joined the Federal Art Project. Subsequently, a mural of his won a cash prize in a 1935 competition and was exhibited at the Architectural League.

== Art career, 1940s–1950s ==
During the 1940s Goeller was represented by the Bonestell Gallery. (Note: Goeller was given solo exhibitions at the Bonestell Gallery in 1945 and 1947. The Bonestell Gallery, operated by Blanche Bonestell at 18 East 57th Street, showed modern painting and sculpture by a wide variety of artists, including especially American women, Hispanics, and, in general, avant-garde artists of the 1940s and 1950s. In 1939 the gallery held an exhibition of a group of experimental artists known as "The Ten" whose members were Ben-Zion, Ilya Bolotowsky, Adolph Gottlieb, Louis Harris, Jack Kufeld, Mark Rothko (then known as Marcus Rothkowitz ), Louis Schanker, and Joseph Solman.) In reviewing the first of his shows with that gallery Howard Devree noted a wide range in style, "from almost stereoscopic realism to a misty impression of New Jersey meadows and veritable silver point drawings of great delicacy and technical perfection." In reviewing the second he added that Goeller found "reluctant beauty" in the landscapes and was able to obtain a "strange mood."

Sometime before 1943 Goeller drew a trompe l'oeil self-portrait entitled "How Does It Feel to be a Piece of Paper?" The drawing makes it seem as if the viewer's eye is the paper on which the artist's pencil is descending. He showed it in the Society of Independent Artists annual exhibition of 1943, at the Bonestell Gallery in 1945, and in museum exhibitions in 1943, 1949, and 1953. (Note: In 1943 Goeller showed the self portrait at the M.H. de Young Memorial Museum, San Francisco; in 1949 at the Irvington Art and Museum Association, New Jersey; and in 1953 at the New Jersey State Museum, Trenton.) In 1941 and 1942 he showed with a group called Modern Artists of New Jersey. (Note: The Modern Artists of New Jersey group was headed by Raymond O'Neill, an artist who taught art at Columbia University during the 1930s, and who was chairman of the New Jersey State Art Committee in 1939. The group staged exhibitions of work by New Jersey artists, particularly young, unknown artists, and sponsored lectures, demonstrations, and public forums to further the advancement of modern art.) In 1943 Goeller joined the Associated Artists of New Jersey and showed with them at the Riverside Museum in 1943, 1944, 1947, and 1950. (Note: The Associated Artists of New Jersey was founded in 1941 in the studio of artist Anne Steele Marsh, sister-in-law of artist Reginald Marsh. Limited to a membership of fifty, the group staged exhibitions in galleries and museums and sponsored public forums.)

In 1952, not long before his untimely death, a landscape of Goeller's appeared in the Whitney Museum annual exhibition of contemporary painting. In reviewing the show Howard Devree listed it along with others that he deemed to be outstanding, describing it as a "moody monochromatic interpretation of the Jersey meadows."

At the outset of his artistic career Goeller said he aimed to achieve coherence in his work and a freedom from exaggeration. He said he wished to avoid "sacrifices to obtain an effect." (Note: Goeller's statement appears in an undated clipping (ca. 1827–28) quoted by Gail Stavitsky in the art exhibition catalog of 2003, already cited.) At the end of his career his work was noted as evoking a pervasive mood of "wistful loneliness" and possessing a "haunting, disquieting aspect" which bore out his belief in "emotion expressed by precision."

== Art teacher ==
Goeller, who has been called a "passionate advocate for art education," was an art instructor in the College of Architecture at Cornell University between 1931 and 1933 and an instructor in the Newark School of Fine and Industrial Arts in the early 1950s.

== Personal life ==
Goeller was born in Irvington, New Jersey, on November 10, 1901. His father, Charles Goeller was born 1876 in Germany and brought to the United States by his parents in 1879. Apart from the few years in Irvington between 1900 and 1910, he lived most of his life in Newark. He was living in nearby Elizabeth when he died in 1961, having outlived his son Charles by six years. In 1884 Goeller's paternal grandfather, Frederick Goeller, founded the Goeller Iron Works in Newark, specializing in ornamental structures. By 1917 Goeller's father had assumed control of the business and renamed it the Charles Goeller Steel Co. In 1942, he again reorganized it, this time as Charles Goeller, Inc., contractors in structural iron and steel. Goeller's mother was Hulda Weiss Goeller, born in 1878, who emigrated to the United States with her parents and seven siblings in 1883. He had an older brother, Leopold, born in Newark in 1899, and a younger sister, Hulda, born in Newark in 1907.

Goeller lived at his parents' Newark home through the 1920s, he shared an apartment in New York in the 1930s, and returned to his parents' home in the early 1940s. He lived in and around northern New Jersey during the remainder of his life.

He moved from New York to New Jersey in 1939 to work in his father's iron and steel factory. During World War II he was employed in the graphic art department of Fleetwings, a firm that made airplanes and aircraft components, located in Bristol, Pennsylvania. In addition to preparing technical drawings Goeller wrote a cartoon for the firm's bi-weekly tabloid newspaper, Fleetwing News. The cartoon featured a female character, Evangeline, who represented the contributions that young women were making to homefront production work. (Note: Fleetwings did not win government contracts to build complete warplanes but did become a successful supplier of wings, control surfaces, and other components, such as solenoid-operated flap valves. It also made specialized tools, including a "light-weight long-reach jaw for rivet squeezers, enabling women to take over what had been strictly a man's job." In 1943 the firm ran two ten-hour shifts with a total of close to 5,000 employees.) Goeller's wartime contribution also included evening classes he taught at Drexel Institute to help prepare for young people for factory work. He died at his home in Elizabeth, New Jersey, on March 6, 1955.

Other names

Goeller's full name was Charles Louis Goeller. He signed his works either Goeller or Charles L. Goeller.
