= Santo Pezzutti =

Italian-American artist (1922–2023)

Santo Pezzutti (June 2, 1922 – December 3, 2023) was an Italian-American artist who resided in New Jersey. He was recognized in Who's Who in American Art and received awards from AT&T, the Montclair Museum, the Monmouth Museum, Nabisco Galleries and the Summit Art Gallery International Show. His artwork has also been published in “Illustrator’s Annual” and “The Best of Watercolor.” In addition to being an accomplished artist, Santo is also a successful sailor.

Born in the foothills of the Alps in Italy, Pezzutti moved to the United States at the age of 5 and settled in Passaic, New Jersey, when his father, a stonemason, moved the family to look for work and opportunities for his children. Pezzutti died on December 3, 2023, at the age of 101.

== Artwork ==
Pezzutti began his art training at the Newark School of Fine and Industrial Art and began his career as an illustrator at Charles Dallas Reach, a Newark advertising agency. He then worked in New York City for a variety of advertising firms, including as the art director of Paris & Pert and as executive art director at Dancer Fitzgerald Sample.

In 2011, Pezzutti was honored by the Monmouth County Arts Council as the Visual Arts category winner in their Celebration of Excellence. See the related article in the Asbury Park Press, dated October 16, 2011.

Pezzutti is best known for semi-impressionistic portraits. His later artwork has been mainly focused on boats and nautical scenes. Santo has described his style as a ”’stream of consciousness” method, never striving for photographic realism.”

== Sailing ==
Pezzutti was a Sanderling fleet champion at the Monmouth Boat Club from 2002 until 2012, an award that is given for the best 24 races on the Navesink River. He also won the Sanderling class honors from 2000-2009, and the trophy detailing these accomplishments was retired and the record has yet to be matched. He has won the Perpetual Awards in the Cruising Bridge Race Series in both the Cruising 1 and Cruising 2 categories.
