= West Belmar, New Jersey =

Populated place in Monmouth County, New Jersey, US

- Census-designated place
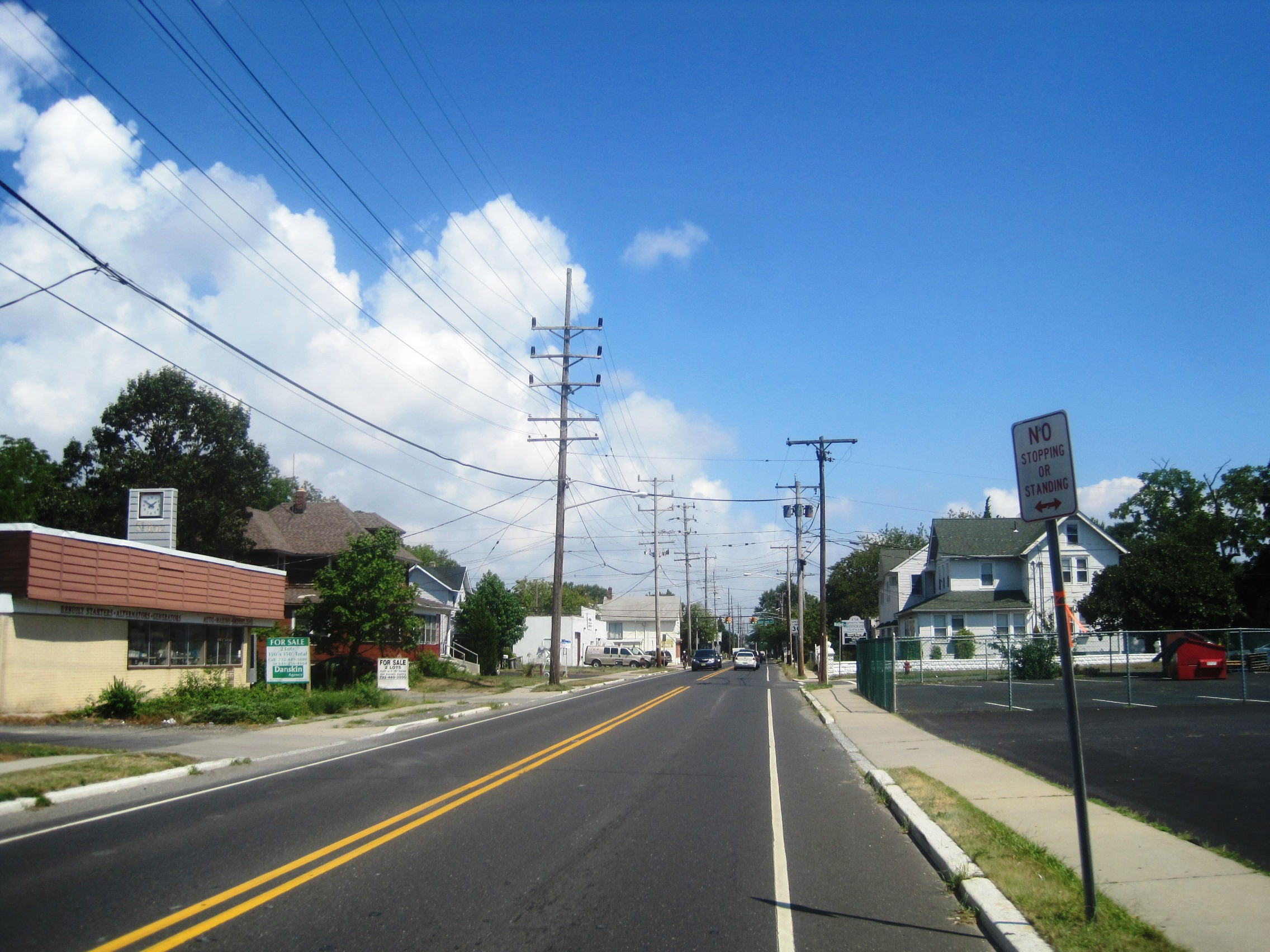
- Looking north along Route 71 approaching the intersection of 17th Avenue

- Map of West Belmar highlighted within Monmouth County. Right: Location of Monmouth County in New Jersey.

- Location in Monmouth County Location in New Jersey Location in the United States
- Coordinates: 40.170665°N 74.037579°W
- Country: United States
- State: New Jersey
- County: Monmouth
- Township: Wall

Area
  - Total: 0.47 sq mi (1.21 km^{2})
  - Land: 0.47 sq mi (1.21 km^{2})
  - Water: 0 sq mi (0.00 km^{2}) 0.00%
- Elevation: 30 ft (9 m)

Population (2020)
  - Total: 2,459
  - Density: 5,242.7/sq mi (2,024.23/km^{2})
- Time zone: UTC−05:00 (Eastern (EST))
  - Summer (DST): UTC−04:00 (Eastern (EDT))
- ZIP Code: 07719 (Belmar)
- Area codes: 732/848
- FIPS code: 34-78350
- GNIS feature ID: 02390466

West Belmar is an unincorporated community and census-designated place (CDP) within Wall Township, in Monmouth County, in the U.S. state of New Jersey. As of the 2020 census, the CDP's population was 2,459.

== Geography ==
West Belmar is in southeastern Monmouth County, on the eastern edge of Wall Township. It is bordered to the north by the borough of Belmar and to the east by the borough of Lake Como. The borough of Spring Lake Heights touches the southeast corner of the CDP, and Route 35 (River Road) forms the CDP's western boundary. Route 35 leads north into Belmar and south 6 miles (10 km) to Point Pleasant Beach. Route 71 runs through the east side of the CDP, leading north into Belmar and south through Spring Lake Heights to Sea Girt and Manasquan. Route 138, the eastern continuation of Interstate 195, has its eastern terminus at Route 70 on the border of West Belmar. Via Interstate 195, Trenton, the state capital, is 41 miles (66 km) to the west.

According to the United States Census Bureau, the West Belmar CDP has an area of 0.47 square miles (1.22 km^{2}), all land.

== Demographics ==
Historical population
| Census | Pop. | Note | %± |
|---|---|---|---|
| 1950 | 2,058 | | — |
| 1960 | 2,511 | | 22.0% |
| 1990 | 2,498 | | — |
| 2000 | 2,606 | | 4.3% |
| 2010 | 2,493 | | −4.3% |
| 2020 | 2,459 | | −1.4% |
Population sources: 1950 1960 1970; 1980 1990 2000; 2010 2020

West Belmar first appeared as an unincorporated community in the 1950 U.S. census. It did not appear in the 1970 U.S. census or the 1980 U.S. census; and then was listed as a census designated place in the 1990 U.S. census.

=== 2020 census ===
As of the 2020 census, West Belmar had a population of 2,459. The median age was 42.6 years. 18.2% of residents were under the age of 18 and 17.0% of residents were 65 years of age or older. For every 100 females there were 95.5 males, and for every 100 females age 18 and over there were 94.2 males age 18 and over.

100.0% of residents lived in urban areas, while 0.0% lived in rural areas.

There were 1,001 households in West Belmar, of which 23.9% had children under the age of 18 living in them. Of all households, 46.6% were married-couple households, 20.1% were households with a male householder and no spouse or partner present, and 24.4% were households with a female householder and no spouse or partner present. About 29.6% of all households were made up of individuals and 9.5% had someone living alone who was 65 years of age or older.

There were 1,104 housing units, of which 9.3% were vacant. The homeowner vacancy rate was 1.6% and the rental vacancy rate was 6.8%.

Racial composition as of the 2020 census
| Race | Number | Percent |
|---|---|---|
| White | 2,038 | 82.9% |
| Black or African American | 24 | 1.0% |
| American Indian and Alaska Native | 7 | 0.3% |
| Asian | 26 | 1.1% |
| Native Hawaiian and Other Pacific Islander | 1 | 0.0% |
| Some other race | 157 | 6.4% |
| Two or more races | 206 | 8.4% |
| Hispanic or Latino (of any race) | 332 | 13.5% |

=== 2010 census ===
The 2010 United States census counted 2,493 people, 984 households, and 646 families in the CDP. The population density was 5,308.6 people per square mile (2,049.7 people/km^{2}). There were 1,092 housing units at an average density of 2,325.3 units per square mile (897.8 units/km^{2}). The racial makeup was 91.01% (2,269) White, 0.60% (15) Black or African American, 0.60% (15) Native American, 1.56% (39) Asian, 0.00% (0) Pacific Islander, 5.09% (127) from other races, and 1.12% (28) from two or more races. Hispanic or Latino of any race were 10.71% (267) of the population.

Of the 984 households, 28.3% had children under the age of 18; 46.2% were married couples living together; 14.5% had a female householder with no husband present and 34.3% were non-families. Of all households, 27.0% were made up of individuals and 9.2% had someone living alone who was 65 years of age or older. The average household size was 2.53 and the average family size was 3.09.

21.5% of the population were under the age of 18, 8.1% from 18 to 24, 27.8% from 25 to 44, 31.0% from 45 to 64, and 11.6% who were 65 years of age or older. The median age was 40.7 years. For every 100 females, the population had 93.9 males. For every 100 females ages 18 and older there were 90.0 males.

=== 2000 census ===
At the 2000 census there were 2,606 people, 1,000 households, and 673 families living in the CDP. The population density was 2,096.2 people/km^{2} (5,429 people/mi^{2}). There were 1,096 housing units at an average density of 881.6 units/km^{2} (2,283 units/mi^{2}). The racial makeup of the CDP was 95.47% White, 0.92% African American, 0.19% Native American, 1.27% Asian, 0.27% Pacific Islander, 0.84% from other races, and 1.04% from two or more races. Hispanic or Latino of any race were 2.57% of the population.

Of the 1,000 households 34.1% had children under the age of 18 living with them, 50.5% were married couples living together, 12.2% had a female householder with no husband present, and 32.7% were non-families. 27.7% of households were one person and 9.7% were one person aged 65 or older. The average household size was 2.61 and the average family size was 3.21.

The age distribution was 26.2% under the age of 18, 7.0% from 18 to 24, 34.3% from 25 to 44, 22.1% from 45 to 64, and 10.3% 65 or older. The median age was 36 years. For every 100 females, there were 94.9 males. For every 100 females age 18 and over, there were 91.1 males.

The median household income was $56,367 and the median family income was $60,144. Males had a median income of $46,458 versus $32,500 for females. The per capita income for the CDP was $22,276. About 4.5% of families and 3.1% of the population were below the poverty line, including 3.4% of those under age 18 and 6.5% of those age 65 or over.

== Notable people ==
People who were born in, residents of, or otherwise closely associated with West Belmar include:

- Nicholas Reale (1922–1984), watercolorist with a lengthy career in art and teaching
