= Schlaraffia =

German fraternal society (1859-)

Schlaraffia is a worldwide German-speaking society founded in Prague (then Austrian Empire) in 1859 with a pledge of friendship, art and humor.

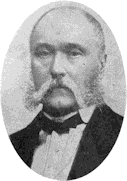
Franz Thomé, founder of the schlaraffia movement

The Schlaraffen, an exclusively male organization (many men of a mellower age and in secure positions), meet in midwinter (1 October – 30 April in the northern hemisphere) once per week in their Schlaraffen castle (equipped in the style of a knight's tavern from the Middle Ages) for "Sippungen" (gatherings which take place in the fixed ceremonial form of a knight's play). In doing so, everyday life is satirized as well as kept alive through recitations of literary and musical forms. An antiquated language with its own vernacular for everyday things (Schlaraffen Latin — for example; "powder pot" for tobacco pipe, "gasoline horse" for car, "castle monster" for mother-in-law) gives the Sippungen their own humorous note. The approximately 280 "Reychs" (local clubs) stay in close contact with one another. Each Schlaraffe is always welcome in every Reich in the world.

Reichs currently exist in Germany, Austria, Switzerland, Italy, Spain, France, Belgium, Sweden, the United States, Canada, Mexico, Venezuela, Colombia, Ecuador, Brazil, Argentina, Thailand, South Africa, and Australia. The total number of Schlaraffen amounts to about 10,000. New members must be introduced by a Schlaraffe (godfather), complete a probationary period before a general vote is recorded, and start their career as a knave, which leads from the position of squire to knight.

Their 'mascot' is the eagle owl (Bubo bubo) symbolizing wisdom, virtue, and humour (the owl itself presents knowledge and wisdom). In 1874, the association's organ Der Schlaraffia Zeyttungen appeared for the first time in Leipzig. It still appears today several times a year.

== People ==
Important artists were and are Schlaraffen, including:

- Franz Lehár
- Gustl Bayrhammer
- Richard Bruno Heydrich
- Leopold Matzal
- Peter Rosegger
