= Leopold Matzal =

American painter

Leopold Matzal, 20th Century Austrian-American Artist

Leopold Charles Matzal (August 13, 1890 – November 22, 1956) was a 20th-century Austrian-American visual artist. He was a realistic painter, known in New York City and northern New Jersey for his society portraiture and also, later in his career, for murals.

== Life ==
Matzal was born on August 13, 1890, in Vienna, Austria, the second of the four children of Carl and Eleanora Prögelhof Matzal. He studied at the Imperial and Royal Academy of Fine Arts in Vienna, 1909–1919. At the Royal Academy, Matzal studied under Alois Delug and Rudolf Jettmar; he also travelled to Germany for studies under Wilhelm Trübner and Heinrich von Zügel. Matzal's studies were interrupted by active duty with the Austro-Hungarian army during World War I. In 1921 he emigrated to the United States. Matzal's first wife died in 1924, and in August 1929 he married Elsa Grasme of Hoboken. He taught at the Newark School of Fine and Industrial Arts in New Jersey, 1928–1956. He was a member of the Salmagundi Club and of the New York branch of the Schlaraffia, a German arts organization. After a long illness, Matzal died on November 22, 1956, at St. Mary's Hospital, Orange, NJ.

== Work ==
Matzal's portraits of State Supreme Court Justice James F. Minturn and State Chancery Court Vice-Chancellor John J. Fallon were both hung in the State House, Trenton, NJ. His portrait of Hoboken Mayor Patrick R. Griffin was hung in the Hoboken City Hall. Matzal also painted portraits of Newark Mayor Ralph A. Villani and New York City Mayor Jimmy Walker. During the period 1922–1929, nine different portraits by Matzal were selected for the exhibitions of the National Academy. Matzal also painted landscapes and seascapes, in both oil and watercolor, especially of scenes in New England and the Catskill Mountains of New York. Matzal painted two murals under the auspices of the Federal Art Project (FAP), a branch of the Works Project Administration. In 1937 he executed a mural at the Branch Brook School for Crippled Children. This mural depicted scenes from children's fairy tales. Matzal completed a second FAP mural in 1939, this one at the Bergen Branch (later renamed the Miller Branch) of the Jersey City Free Public Library. This mural featured scenes from the writings of Washington Irving, Henry Wadsworth Longfellow, and Mark Twain. In 1949 Matzal painted murals depicting the four seasons for the Stacy-Trent Hotel in Trenton, NJ, and then in 1950 two large murals of English deer hunting scenes for the Roost Restaurant of Newark, NJ.

== Notable students ==
- Maurice Bilton
- Leo Dee
- Helen Frank
- William D. Gorman
- Mel Klapholz
- Louis Konwiser
- Louis Legakis
- Felix Nestele
- Warren Padovan
- Michael Stoffa
- Charles Waterhouse
