= Irvington, New Jersey =

Township in Essex County, New Jersey, US

- Township
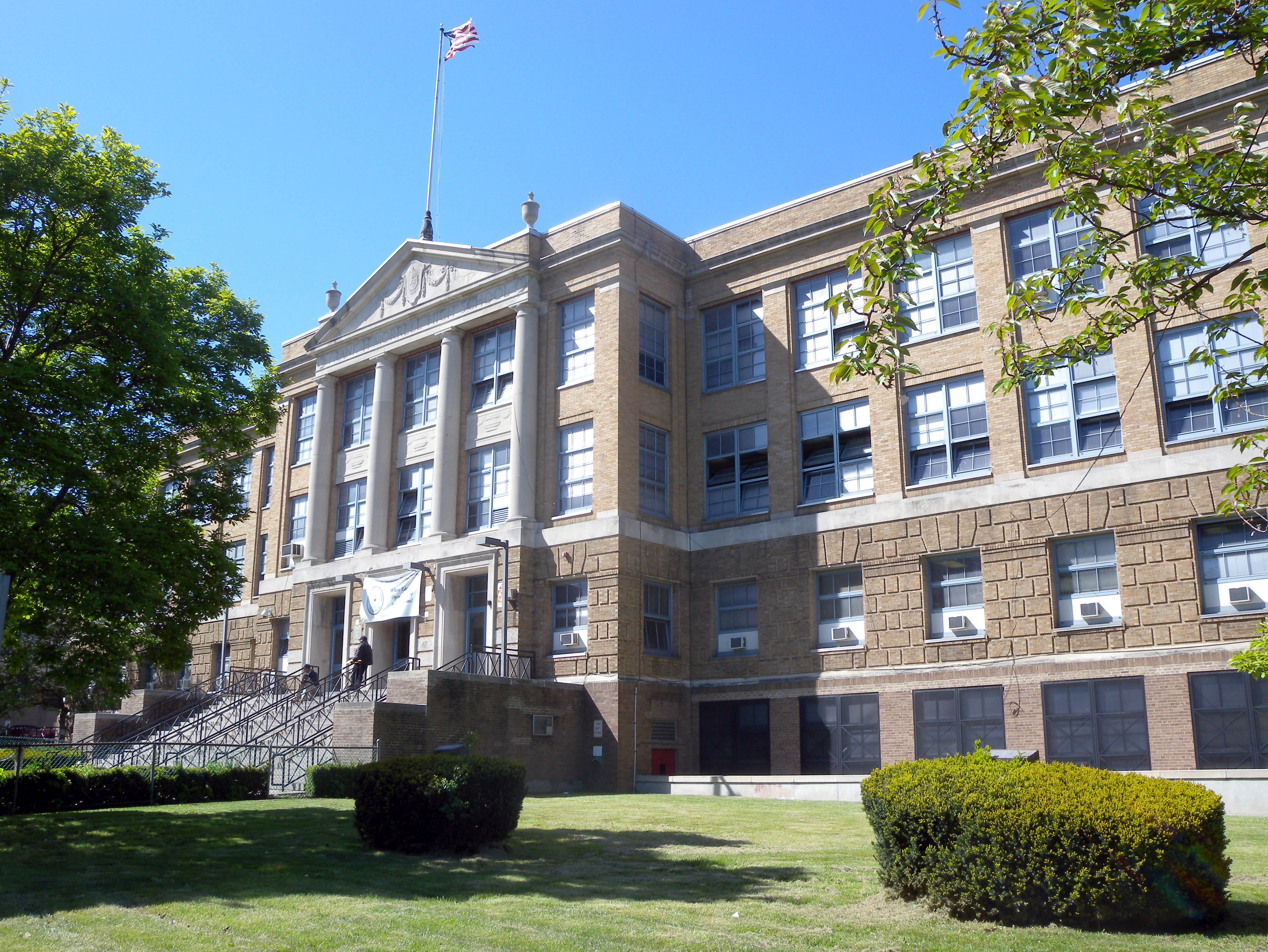
- Irvington High School

- Logo
- Interactive map of Irvington, New Jersey
- Location in Essex County Location in New Jersey Location in the United States
- Coordinates: 40.723859°N 74.232522°W
- Country: United States
- State: New Jersey
- County: Essex
- Incorporated: March 27, 1874
- Named for: Washington Irving

Government
  - Type: Faulkner Act (mayor–council)
  - Body: Township Council
  - Mayor: Tony Vauss (term ends June 30, 2026)
  - Business Administrator: Musa A. Malik
  - Municipal Clerk: Shawna Supel

Area
  - Total: 2.92 sq mi (7.55 km^{2})
  - Land: 2.92 sq mi (7.55 km^{2})
  - Water: 0.0039 sq mi (0.01 km^{2}) 0.07%
  - Rank: 338th of 565 in state 16th of 22 in county
- Elevation: 128 ft (39 m)

Population (2020)
  - Total: 61,176
  - Estimate (2024): 61,838
  - Rank: 24th of 565 in state 3rd of 22 in county
  - Density: 20,993.8/sq mi (8,105.8/km^{2})
  - Rank: 9th of 565 in state 1st of 22 in county
- Time zone: UTC−05:00 (Eastern (EST))
  - Summer (DST): UTC−04:00 (Eastern (EDT))
- ZIP Code: 07111
- Area code: 973
- FIPS code: 3401334450
- GNIS feature ID: 0877363
- Website: irvingtonnj.gov

Irvington is a township in Essex County, in the U.S. state of New Jersey. As of the 2020 United States census, the township's population was 61,176, an increase of 7,250 (+13.4%) from the 2010 census count of 53,926, which in turn reflected a decline of 6,769 (−11.2%) from the 60,695 counted in the 2000 census.

The township had the ninth-highest property tax rate in New Jersey in 2020, with an equalized rate of 4.890% in 2020, compared to 2.824% in the county as a whole and a statewide average of 2.279%.

== History ==
Clinton Township, which included what is now Irvington, Maplewood and parts of Newark and South Orange, was created on April 14, 1834. The area was known as Camptown until the mid-1800s. In 1850, after Stephen Foster published his ballad, Camptown Races, residents were concerned that the activities described in the song would be associated with their community. The town was renamed, Irvingtown, in honor of Washington Irving.

Irvington was incorporated as an independent village on March 27, 1874, from portions of Clinton Township. What remained of Clinton Township was absorbed into Newark on March 5, 1902. On March 2, 1898, Irvington was incorporated as a town, replacing Irvington Village. In 1982, the town was one of four Essex County municipalities to pass a referendum to become a township, joining 11 municipalities that had already made the change, of what would ultimately be more than a dozen Essex County municipalities to reclassify themselves as townships in order take advantage of federal revenue sharing policies that allocated townships a greater share of government aid to municipalities on a per capita basis.

From 1887 to 1965, Irvington was home to Olympic Park, a 40-acre (16 ha) amusement park that straddled the border of Irvington and Maplewood, with the main entrance on Chancellor Avenue and a side entrance on 40th Street. After the park closed, the merry-go-round was sold and transported to Disney World, in Orlando, FL. The book, Smile: A Picture History of Olympic Park, 1887–1965 written by Alan A. Siegel was published in 1983 by Rutgers University Press.

The 1967 Newark riots hastened an exodus of families from Newark, many relocating to neighboring Irvington. Until 1965, Irvington was almost exclusively white. By 1980, the town was nearly 40% black; by 1990 it was 70%.

On July 1, 1980, Fred Bost, was sworn in as East Ward Councilman, making him the first black person to serve on the Town Council. At age 24, Michael G. Steele became the first black elected to public office in Irvington when he won a seat on the school board on March 25, 1980, then became the township's first black mayor ten years later, when he was elected in 1990 and served for four years, followed by Sarah Brockington Bost in 1994. In 1994 Steele returned to the Board of Education to pursue his career as the district's certified School Business Administrator, serving over 22 years. The current mayor is Tony Vauss.

== Geography ==
According to the United States Census Bureau, the township had a total area of 2.92 square miles (7.55 km^{2}), including 2.91 square miles (7.55 km^{2}) of land and <0.01 square miles (0.01 km^{2}) of water (0.07%).

The Elizabeth River runs through the township, passing Civic Square and Clinton Cemetery. Unincorporated communities, localities and place names located partially or completely within the township include Irving Place.

The township is bordered by Maplewood to the west and Newark to the east, both in Essex County, and Hillside to the south and Union to the southwest, both in Union County, New Jersey.

== Demographics ==
Historical population
Census	Pop.	Note	%±
1880	1,677		—
1900	5,255		—
1910	11,877		126.0%
1920	25,480		114.5%
1930	56,733		122.7%
1940	55,328		−2.5%
1950	59,201		7.0%
1960	59,379		0.3%
1970	59,743		0.6%
1980	61,493		2.9%
1990	61,018		−0.8%
2000	60,695		−0.5%
2010	53,926		−11.2%
2020	61,176		13.4%
2024 (est.)	61,838		1.1%
Population sources:1900–1920 1900–1910 1880–1930; 1940–2000 2000; 2010 2020

=== 2020 census ===
Irvington township, Essex County, New Jersey – Racial and ethnic composition Note: the US Census treats Hispanic/Latino as an ethnic category. This table excludes Latinos from the racial categories and assigns them to a separate category. Hispanics/Latinos may be of any race.
Race / Ethnicity (NH = Non-Hispanic)	Pop 1990	Pop 2000	Pop 2010	Pop 2020	% 1990	% 2000	% 2010	% 2020
White alone (NH)	11,323	3,465	1,430	983	18.56%	5.71%	2.65%	1.61%
Black or African American alone (NH)	41,646	48,852	45,285	48,208	68.25%	80.49%	83.98%	78.80%
Native American or Alaska Native alone (NH)	133	100	125	84	0.22%	0.16%	0.23%	0.14%
Asian alone (NH)	1,256	661	462	413	2.06%	1.09%	0.86%	0.68%
Pacific Islander alone (NH)	N/A	39	18	7	N/A	0.06%	0.03%	0.01%
Some Other Race alone (NH)	205	228	193	429	0.34%	0.38%	0.36%	0.70%
Mixed Race or Multi-Racial (NH)	N/A	2,264	698	2,067	N/A	3.73%	1.29%	3.38%
Hispanic or Latino (any race)	6,455	5,086	5,716	8,985	10.58%	8.38%	10.60%	14.69%
Total	61,018	60,695	53,926	61,176	100.00%	100.00%	100.00%	100.00%

=== 2010 census ===
The 2010 United States census counted 53,926 people, 20,093 households, and 12,839 families in the township. The population density was 18,417.0 per square mile (7,110.8/km^{2}). There were 23,196 housing units at an average density of 7,922.0 per square mile (3,058.7/km^{2}). The racial makeup was 5.64% (3,042) White, 85.41% (46,058) Black or African American, 0.38% (204) Native American, 0.87% (471) Asian, 0.07% (38) Pacific Islander, 5.42% (2,922) from other races, and 2.21% (1,191) from two or more races. Hispanic or Latino of any race were 10.60% (5,716) of the population.

Of the 20,093 households, 30.9% had children under the age of 18; 27.6% were married couples living together; 27.9% had a female householder with no husband present and 36.1% were non-families. Of all households, 31.0% were made up of individuals and 6.8% had someone living alone who was 65 years of age or older. The average household size was 2.66 and the average family size was 3.33.

25.4% of the population were under the age of 18, 10.6% from 18 to 24, 30.0% from 25 to 44, 25.1% from 45 to 64, and 9.0% who were 65 years of age or older. The median age was 34.0 years. For every 100 females, the population had 88.3 males. For every 100 females ages 18 and older there were 84.2 males.

The Census Bureau's 2006–2010 American Community Survey showed that (in 2010 inflation-adjusted dollars) median household income was $42,580, and the median family income was $50,798. Males had a median income of $38,033 versus $36,720 for females. The per capita income for the township was $20,520. About 14.4% of families and 16.8% of the population were below the poverty line, including 24.4% of those under age 18 and 16.7% of those age 65 or over.

=== 2000 census ===
As of the 2000 United States census there were 60,695 people, 22,032 households, and 14,408 families residing in the township. The population density was 20,528.3 inhabitants per square mile (7,926.0/km^{2}). There were 24,116 housing units at an average density of 8,156.5 per square mile (3,149.2/km^{2}). The racial makeup of the township was 81.66% Black or African American, 8.97% White, 0.24% Native American, 1.10% Asian, 0.10% Pacific Islander, 3.68% from other races, and 4.24% from two or more races. Hispanic or Latino of any race were 8.38% of the population.

As part of the 2000 Census, 81.66% of Irvington's residents identified themselves as being Black or African American. This was one of the highest percentages of African American people in the United States, and the third-highest in New Jersey (behind Lawnside at 93.6%, and East Orange at 89.46%) of all places with 1,000 or more residents identifying their ancestry.

There were 22,032 households, out of which 33.9% had children under the age of 18 living with them, 30.2% were married couples living together, 27.6% had a female householder with no husband present, and 34.6% were non-families. 29.3% of all households were made up of individuals, and 6.4% had someone living alone who was 65 years of age or older. The average household size was 2.74 and the average family size was 3.39.

In the township the age distribution of the population shows 28.0% under the age of 18, 10.7% from 18 to 24, 32.3% from 25 to 44, 21.5% from 45 to 64, and 7.5% who were 65 years of age or older. The median age was 32 years. For every 100 females, there were 87.7 males. For every 100 females age 18 and over, there were 81.5 males.

The median income for a household in the township was $36,575, and the median income for a family was $41,098. Males had a median income of $32,043 versus $27,244 for females. The per capita income for the township was $16,874. About 15.8% of families and 17.4% of the population were below the poverty line, including 22.9% of those under age 18 and 12.2% of those age 65 or over.

=== Crime ===
Irvington experienced the crack epidemic of the 1980s and has struggled with its aftermath. The township's violent crime rate was six times higher than New Jersey overall and the murder rate eight times higher than statewide statistics. In 2007, the New Jersey State Police reported that Irvington had a violent crime rate of 22.4 incidents per 1,000 population, the highest of all 15 major urban areas in the state.

According to the New Jersey State Police Uniform Crime Report for 2013, year-to-year between 2012 and 2013, Irvington experienced an overall reduction in crime of 9% (from 49.6 to 45.2 incidents per 1,000), with reductions coming from overall non-violent crime (18%) and aggravated assault (22%), but an increase in the violent crime rate of 16% from 13.1 incidents per 1,000 to 15.3.

== Economy ==
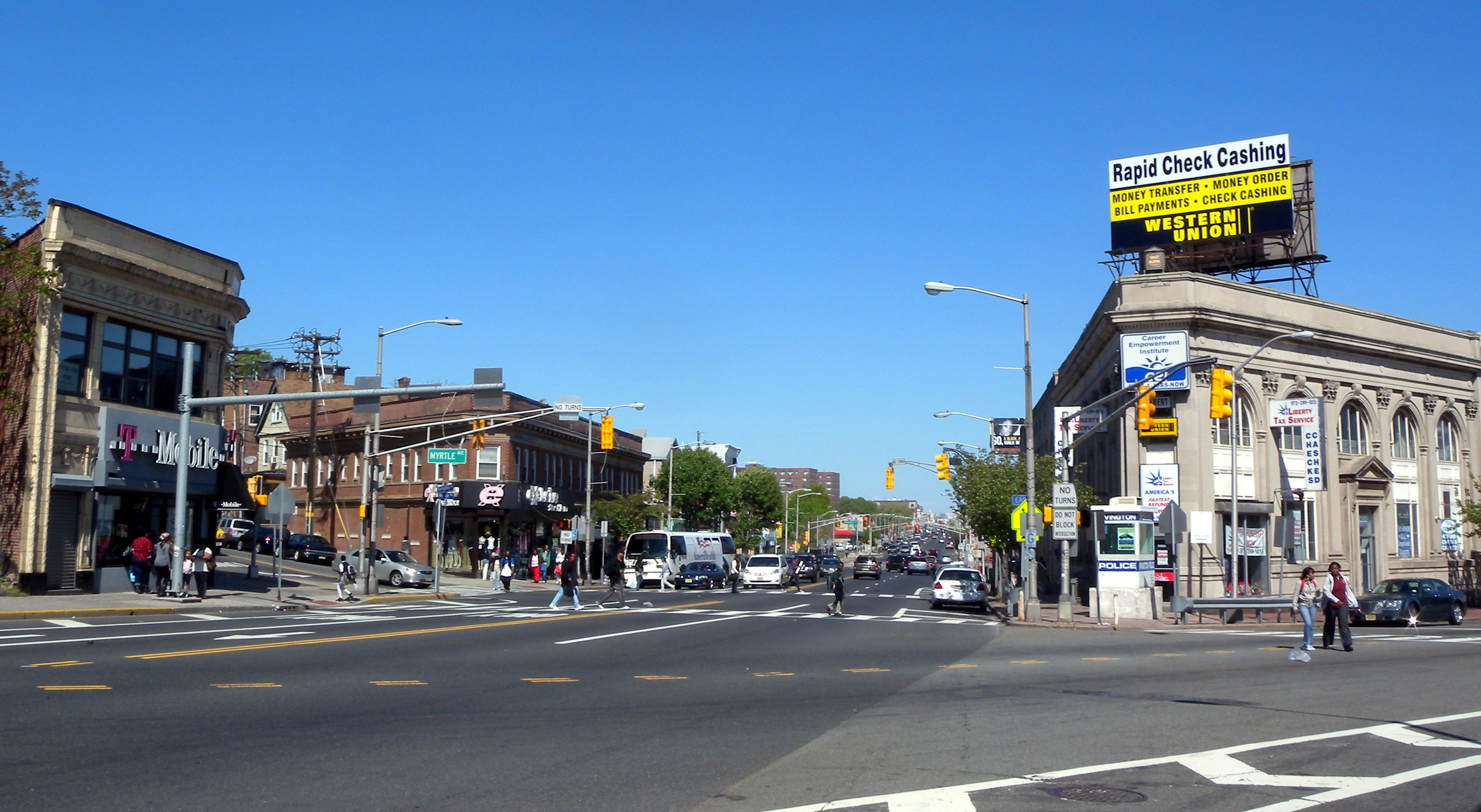
Springfield Avenue commercial district

Portions of the township are part of an Urban Enterprise Zone (UEZ), one of 32 zones covering 37 municipalities statewide. Irvington was selected in 1996 as one of a group of seven zones added to participate in the program. In addition to other benefits to encourage employment and investment within the UEZ, shoppers can take advantage of a reduced 3.3125% sales tax rate (half of the 6 5/8% rate charged statewide) at eligible merchants. Established in May 1996, the township's Urban Enterprise Zone status expires in May 2027.

In July 2015, the central business district surrounding the Irvington Bus Terminal on Springfield Avenue was designated as one of 33 transit villages statewide, qualifying it for incentives for revitalization.

== Theatres ==
Irvington had six movie theatres that provided live stage appearances or films for their patrons amusement. Several theatres were constructed in the 1920s during the silent films era. A few theaters were installed with Wurlitzers, such as the Castle, Chancellor, and Sanford. A Wurlitzer opus 1885 was installed at Chancellor Theater, known prior as the Roxy or Rex. The Sanford had a Wurlitzer organ opus 1301 installed. The organs were used for silent movies, stage acts, or intermissions. Motion pictures began to increase in showings during the 1940s and 1950s, but a downturn in audience attendance resulted in theaters closing during the 1970s. As of 2024, there are no movie theaters operating in the township.

== Government ==
=== Local government ===
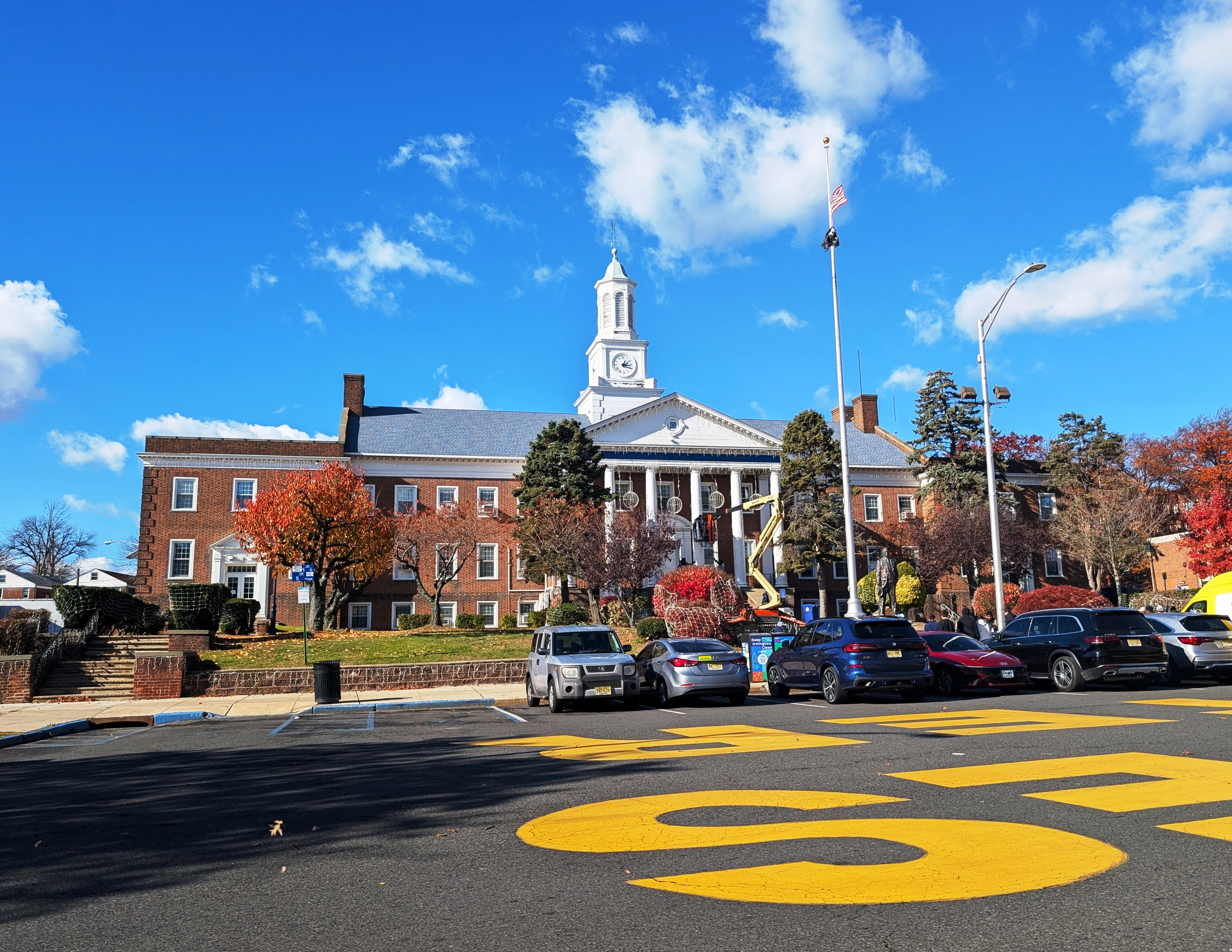
Irvington Municipal Building

Irvington is governed within the Faulkner Act, formally known as the Optional Municipal Charter Law, under the Mayor-Council form of municipal government, one of 71 municipalities (of the 564) statewide that use this form. The governing body is comprised of the Mayor and the seven-member Township Council, whose members are elected to staggered four-year terms of office on a non-partisan basis in municipal elections held on the second Tuesday in May in even-numbered years. The mayor and the three at-large seats are elected together and two years later the four ward seats are up for vote together. The council selects a president, first vice president and second vice president from among its members at a reorganization meeting held after each election. The council is the legislative body of the township and needs a two-thirds majority to make changes to the budget submitted by the mayor. The mayor is the township's chief executive and is responsible for overseeing the day-to-day operations and submitting a budget, but is not eligible to vote on the council and is not required to attend its meetings.

As of 2025, the mayor of Irvington is Tony Vauss, whose term of office ends June 30, 2026. Members of the Township Council are Council President Jamillah Z. Beasley (South Ward, 2028), Council First Vice President October Hudley (East Ward, 2028), Council Second Vice President Charnette Frederic (At-large, 2026), Darlene Brown (At-Large, 2026), Vernal C. Cox Sr. (West Ward, 2028), Anthony Vauss Jr. (At-Large, 2026; elected to serve an unexpired term) and Orlander Glen Vick (North Ward, 2028).

In November 2024, Anthony Vauss Jr. was elected to fill the at-large seat expiring in June 2026 that became vacant after Renee Burgess resigned from office in September 2022 to take office in the New Jersey Senate.

In April 2019, Jamillah Z. Beasley was appointed to fill the South Ward seat expiring in December 2020 that became vacant following the death of Sandra M. Jones. She served on an interim basis until the November 2019 general election, when she was elected to serve the balance of the term of office.

Council President David Lyons, who had served six terms in office representing the North Ward, died in August 2019.

=== Federal, state and county representation ===
Irvington is located in the 10th Congressional District and is part of New Jersey's 28th state legislative district.

For the 119th United States Congress, New Jersey's 10th congressional district is represented by LaMonica McIver (D, Newark). New Jersey is represented in the United States Senate by Democrats Cory Booker (Newark, term ends 2027) and Andy Kim (Moorestown, term ends 2031).

For the 2026–2027 session, the 28th legislative district of the New Jersey Legislature is represented in the State Senate by Renee Burgess (D, Irvington) and in the General Assembly by Chigozie Onyema (D, Newark) and Cleopatra Tucker (D, Newark).

Essex County is governed by a directly elected county executive, with legislative functions performed by the Board of County Commissioners. As of 2025, the County Executive is Joseph N. DiVincenzo Jr. (D, Roseland), whose four-year term of office ends December 31, 2026. The county's Board of County Commissioners is composed of nine members, five of whom are elected from districts and four of whom are elected on an at-large basis. They are elected for three-year concurrent terms and may be re-elected to successive terms at the annual election in November. Essex County's Commissioners are:

Robert Mercado (D, District 1 – Newark's North and East Wards, parts of Central and West Wards; Newark, 2026), A'Dorian Murray-Thomas (D, District 2 – Irvington, Maplewood and parts of Newark's South and West Wards; Newark, 2026), Vice President Tyshammie L. Cooper (D, District 3 - Newark: West and Central Wards; East Orange, Orange and South Orange; East Orange, 2026), Leonard M. Luciano (D, District 4 – Caldwell, Cedar Grove, Essex Fells, Fairfield, Livingston, Millburn, North Caldwell, Roseland, Verona, West Caldwell and West Orange; West Caldwell, 2026), President Carlos M. Pomares (D, District 5 – Belleville, Bloomfield, Glen Ridge, Montclair and Nutley; Bloomfield, 2026), Brendan W. Gill (D, at large; Montclair, 2026), Romaine Graham (D, at large; Irvington, 2026), Wayne Richardson (D, at large; Newark, 2026), Patricia Sebold (D, at-large; Livingston, 2026).

Constitutional officers elected countywide are: Clerk Christopher J. Durkin (D, West Caldwell, 2025), Register of Deeds Juan M. Rivera Jr. (D, Newark, 2029), Sheriff Amir Jones (D, Newark, 2027), and Surrogate Alturrick Kenney (D, Newark, 2028).

=== Politics ===
As of March 2011, there were 28,545 registered voters in Irvington, of which 14,694 (51.5%) were registered as Democrats, 404 (1.4%) were registered as Republicans and 13,442 (47.1%) were registered as Unaffiliated. There were 5 voters registered to other parties such as the Libertarian Party and Green Party.

United States presidential election results for Irvington
Year	Republican		Democratic		Third party(ies)	
Year	No.	%	No.	%	No.	%
2024	1,459	9.35%	14,000	89.69%	150	0.96%
2020	906	4.95%	17,345	94.67%	70	0.38%
2016	579	3.30%	16,771	95.57%	198	1.13%
2012	363	1.92%	18,538	97.88%	38	0.20%
2008	493	2.54%	18,923	97.32%	29	0.15%
2004	1,189	7.36%	14,885	92.14%	80	0.50%

In the 2012 presidential election, Democrat Barack Obama received 97.9% of the vote (18,538 cast), ahead of Republican Mitt Romney with 1.9% (363 votes), and other candidates with 0.2% (38 votes), among the 19,036 ballots cast by the township's 30,744 registered voters (97 ballots were spoiled), for a turnout of 61.9%. In the 2008 presidential election, Democrat Barack Obama received 96.9% of the vote (18,923 cast), ahead of Republican John McCain with 2.5% (493 votes) and other candidates with 0.1% (29 votes), among the 19,533 ballots cast by the township's 28,879 registered voters, for a turnout of 67.6%. In the 2004 presidential election, Democrat John Kerry received 91.8% of the vote (14,885 ballots cast), outpolling Republican George W. Bush with 7.3% (1,189 votes) and other candidates with 0.3% (80 votes), among the 16,211 ballots cast by the township's 26,594 registered voters, for a turnout percentage of 61.0.

Gubernatorial election results for Irvington
Year	Republican		Democratic		Third party(ies)	
Year	No.	%	No.	%	No.	%
2025	503	4.45%	10,746	95.16%	44	0.39%
2021	351	4.49%	7,447	95.30%	16	0.20%
2017	208	2.39%	8,300	95.51%	182	2.09%
2013	1,028	13.06%	6,800	86.40%	42	0.53%
2009	459	4.67%	9,218	93.72%	159	1.62%
2005	458	4.72%	9,152	94.35%	90	0.93%

In the 2013 gubernatorial election, Democrat Barbara Buono received 86.4% of the vote (6,800 cast), ahead of Republican Chris Christie with 13.1% (1,028 votes), and other candidates with 0.5% (42 votes), among the 8,030 ballots cast by the township's 31,292 registered voters (160 ballots were spoiled), for a turnout of 25.7%. In the 2009 gubernatorial election, Democrat Jon Corzine received 93.2% of the vote (9,218 ballots cast), ahead of Republican Chris Christie with 4.6% (459 votes), Independent Chris Daggett with 0.9% (93 votes) and other candidates with 0.7% (66 votes), among the 9,894 ballots cast by the township's 28,189 registered voters, yielding a 35.1% turnout.

United States Senate election results for Irvington1
Year	Republican		Democratic		Third party(ies)	
Year	No.	%	No.	%	No.	%
2024	1,204	8.03%	13,452	89.71%	339	2.26%
2018	360	2.95%	11,666	95.65%	170	1.39%
2012	309	1.81%	16,644	97.46%	124	0.73%
2006	438	5.45%	7,521	93.57%	79	0.98%

United States Senate election results for Irvington2
Year	Republican		Democratic		Third party(ies)	
Year	No.	%	No.	%	No.	%
2020	648	3.62%	17,105	95.43%	172	0.96%
2014	184	2.35%	7,573	96.55%	87	1.11%
2013	186	2.71%	6,620	96.30%	68	0.99%
2008	424	2.60%	15,738	96.42%	161	0.99%

=== Town of Irvington v. Elouise McDaniel ===
In 2022, Irvington sued local resident Elouise McDaniel, 82, accusing her of harassment and bullying by using her rights under New Jersey's Open Public Records Act. Both Mayor Vauss and Municipal Clerk Harold Wiener denied filing the lawsuit when interviewed, with Wiener commenting "She does file a lot of OPRAs. That comes with the territory, my territory. I know Ms. McDaniel. I don’t have a problem with her." After being the first to report on the story, WNBC was sent two cease and desist letters by the township, accusing them of harassment. After the lawsuit became widely publicized, Irvington dropped it.

== Education ==
The Irvington Public Schools serve students from pre-kindergarten through twelfth grade. The district is one of 31 former Abbott districts statewide that were established pursuant to the decision by the New Jersey Supreme Court in Abbott v. Burke which are now referred to as "SDA Districts" based on the requirement for the state to cover all costs for school building and renovation projects in these districts under the supervision of the New Jersey Schools Development Authority. As of the 2019–20 school year, the district, comprised of 12 schools, had an enrollment of 8,020 students and 530.0 classroom teachers (on an FTE basis), for a student–teacher ratio of 15.1:1. Schools in the district (with 2019–20 enrollment data from the National Center for Education Statistics) are Augusta Preschool Academy (with 341 students; in Pre-K), Berkeley Terrace School (387; Pre-K–5), Chancellor Avenue School (527; K–5), Florence Avenue School (672; K–5), Grove Street School (428; Pre-K–5), Madison Avenue School (410; Pre-K–5), Thurgood G. Marshall School (398; Pre-K–5), Mount Vernon Avenue School (542; K–5), University Elementary School (403; K–5), Union Avenue Middle School (778; 6–8), University Middle School (403; 6–8) and Irvington High School (1,558; 9–12). The district's high school was the 309th-ranked public high school in New Jersey out of 328 schools statewide in New Jersey Monthly magazine's September 2012 cover story on the state's "Top Public High Schools", after being ranked 287th in 2010 out of 322 schools listed.

== Transportation ==
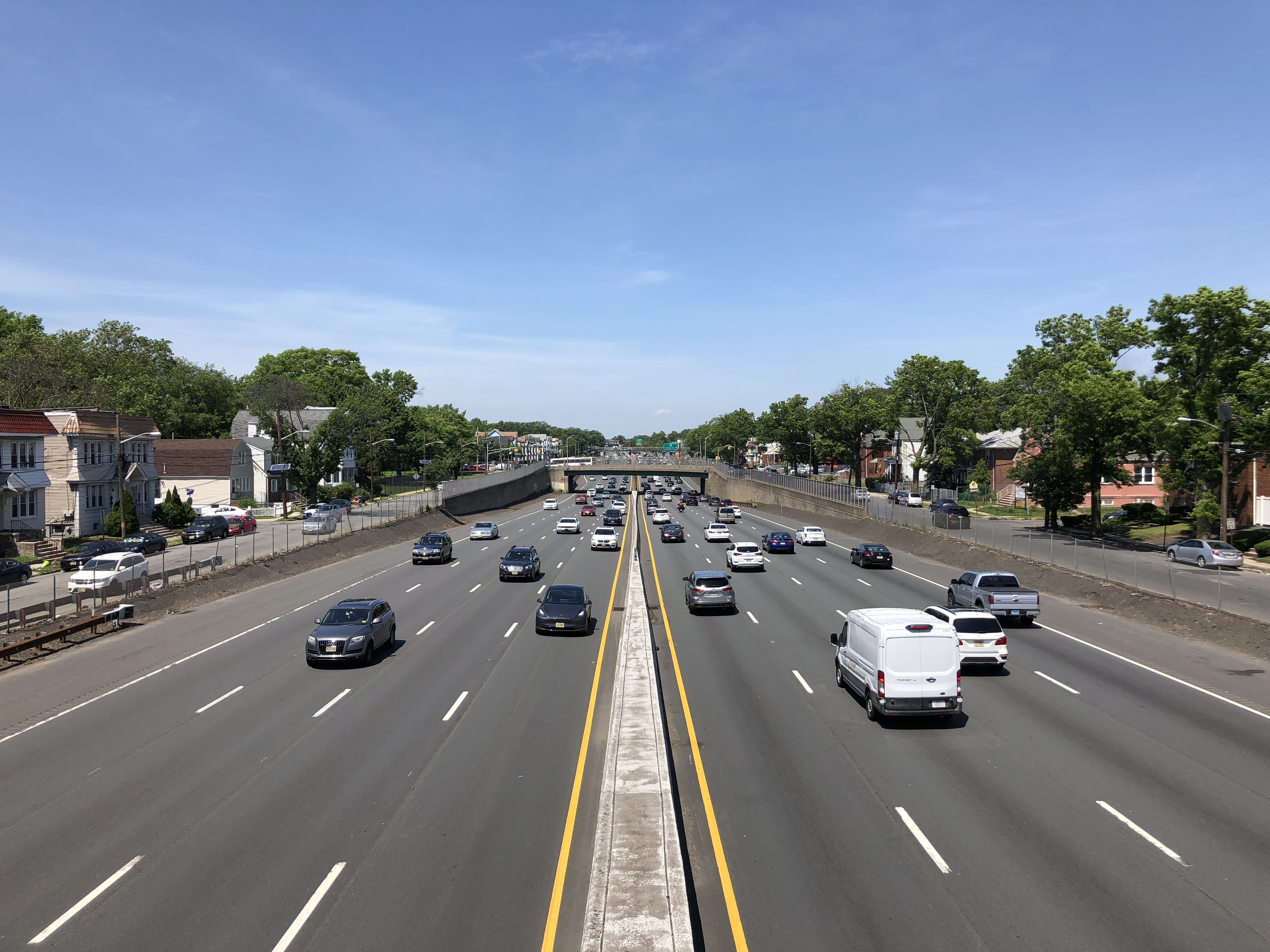
Garden State Parkway northbound in Irvington

=== Roads and highways ===
As of May 2010, the township had a total of 69.44 miles (111.75 km) of roadways, of which 55.98 miles (90.09 km) were maintained by the municipality, 10.69 miles (17.20 km) by Essex County, 2.60 miles (4.18 km) by the New Jersey Turnpike Authority and 0.17 miles (0.27 km) by the New Jersey Department of Transportation.

The Garden State Parkway is the most significant highway in Irvington, passing through the center of the township; it is accessible from exits 143 and 144. Interstate 78 also passes through very briefly along the southeastern border at Exit 54. The most significant local roadway passing through Irvington is County Road 509.

=== Public transportation ===
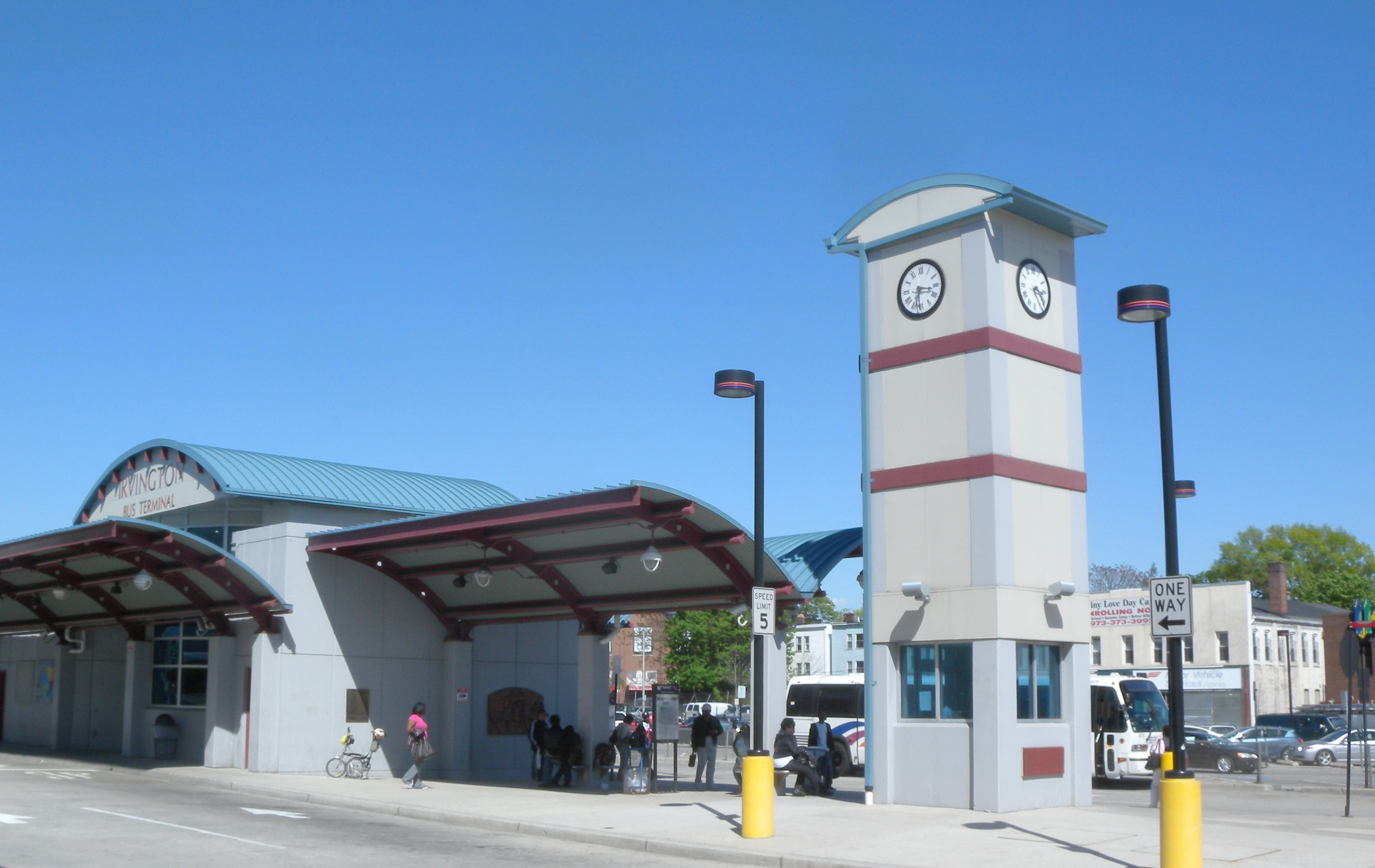
Bus Terminal

The Irvington Bus Terminal, which underwent renovation in the early 2000s, is one of NJ Transit's (NJT) busiest facilities and regional transit hubs. Irvington is served by NJ Transit bus routes 107 to the Port Authority Bus Terminal in Midtown Manhattan; the 1, 13, 25, 27, 37, 39, 70, 90 and 94 to Newark; and local service on the 26, 96. The 375 and the 107X also serves Irvington Bus Terminal as express routes.

Scheduled airline service is available at Newark Liberty International Airport in neighboring Newark and Elizabeth.

== Notable people ==
People who were born in, residents of, or otherwise closely associated with Irvington include:

- Harold A. Ackerman (1928–2009), United States district judge of the United States District Court for the District of New Jersey
- Richie Adubato (1937–2025), former NBA coach for the Detroit Pistons, Orlando Magic and Dallas Mavericks
- Paul Boris (born 1955), former pitcher for the Minnesota Twins
- W. Carl Burger (1925–2023), abstract expressionist painter
- Renee Burgess, politician who has represented the 28th legislative district in the New Jersey Senate since September 2022
- Glen Burtnik (born 1955), singer, songwriter, entertainer and multi-instrumentalist, best known as a former member of the band Styx
- Asnage Castelly (born 1979), wrestler competing for Haiti at the 2016 Summer Olympics
- Cyrus Durand Chapman (1856–1918), artist and architect who achieved fame with his painting The Wedding Bonnet
- Rakeem Christmas (born 1991), basketball player for the Fort Wayne Mad Ants, on assignment from the Indiana Pacers of the NBA
- Josh Evans (born 1991), free safety who has played in the NFL for the Jacksonville Jaguars
- Vera Farmiga (born 1973), Academy Award-nominated actress, film director and producer
- Charles Goeller (1901–1955), artist best known for precise and detailed paintings and drawings
- Ina Golub (1938–2015), fiber artist specializing in Judaica
- Mike Goodson (born 1987), running back who has played in the NFL for the New York Jets
- Austin Gunsel (1909–1974), National Football League's interim commissioner following the death of Bert Bell on October 11, 1959
- William C. Hill (1917–1998), Associate Justice of the Vermont Supreme Court
- Frank Hiller (1920–1987), MLB pitcher from 1946 to 1953 who played for the New York Giants, Chicago Cubs, New York Yankees and Cincinnati Reds
- Erna Schneider Hoover (born 1926), mathematician notable for inventing a computerized telephone switching method
- James J. Howard (1927–1988), represented New Jersey's 3rd congressional district in the United States House of Representatives from 1965 to 1988
- Kareem Huggins (born 1986), running back for the Tampa Bay Buccaneers
- Sanford Hunt (1881–1943), member of the Cornell Big Red football team who was a consensus All-American at the guard position in 1901 and later an editor and director of The Newark Sunday Call
- Jeff Janiak (born 1976), vocalist of the punk rock band Discharge
- Jay W. Jensen (1931–2007), drama teacher
- Cullen Jones (born 1984), gold medal-winning swimmer at the 2008 Summer Olympics in Beijing in the Men's 4 × 100 m freestyle relay
- Ron Karnaugh (born 1966), former competition swimmer who represented the United States at the 1992 Summer Olympics
- Jack Kiley (1929–1982), professional basketball player who played for the Fort Wayne Pistons
- Martin E. Kravarik (1936–2018), politician who served in the New Jersey General Assembly from District 7B from 1970 to 1972
- Queen Latifah (born 1970), rapper, singer, actress, producer
- Jerry Lewis (1926–2017), comedian, actor, director
- Kevin Lyles (born 1973), former sprinter
- Boris Malenko (1933–1994), professional wrestler and professional wrestling trainer
- Adrienne A. Mandel (born 1936), politician who represented the 19th District in the Maryland House of Delegates for more than ten years
- John J. Miller Jr. (1923–2012), politician who served in the New Jersey General Assembly from 1962 to 1964
- Percy A. Miller Jr. (1899–1984), politician who served as Speaker of the New Jersey General Assembly and was Mayor of Irvington from 1934 to 1938
- Joe Morello (1928–2011), drummer best known for his work with The Dave Brubeck Quartet
- Raheem Morris (born 1976), head coach of the Atlanta Falcons
- Sybil Moses (c. 1939–2009), prosecutor of the "Dr. X" Mario Jascalevich murder case and New Jersey Superior Court judge
- Frank Muehlheuser (1926–2006), American football fullback and linebacker who played in the NFL for the Boston Yanks and New York Bulldogs
- Al-Quadin Muhammad (born 1995), defensive end for the New Orleans Saints of the National Football League
- Napoleon (born 1977), rapper known for being a former member of Tupac Shakur's group, the Outlawz
- Rocco Neri (1919–2011), politician who served as a member of the New Jersey General Assembly from 1974 to 1976
- Blanche Noyes (1900–1981), pioneering female aviator who was among the first ten women to receive a pilot's license
- Bob Perina (1921–1991), running back, quarterback and defensive back who played in the NFL for five seasons
- Fabiana Pierre-Louis (born 1980), lawyer who was nominated in June 2020 to serve on the New Jersey Supreme Court
- Pras (born 1972), rapper, record producer, songwriter and actor, best known as one of the founding members of the Fugees
- Kenneth Raffa (born 1950), entomologist
- Robert Randolph (born 1977), singer and guitarist for Robert Randolph & the Family band
- Nicholas Reale (1922–1984), watercolorist with a lengthy career in art and teaching
- Trevor Reckling (born 1989), former professional baseball player
- Nate Robinson (born 1985), former football defensive tackle
- Mark Rudd (born 1947), educator and anti-war activist
- Al Santorini (born 1948), former MLB pitcher who played for the Atlanta Braves, San Diego Padres and St. Louis Cardinals
- O. K. Sato (1871–1921), vaudeville performer best known for his comedic juggling
- Artie Schroeck (born 1938), composer and arranger
- Adon Shuler (born 2004), American football safety for the Notre Dame Fighting Irish
- Art Sinsabaugh (1924–1983), photographer
- Craig A. Stanley (born 1955), politician who served in the New Jersey General Assembly from 1996 to 2008, where he represented the 28th Legislative District
- Gary Saul Stein (born 1933), attorney and former Associate Justice of the New Jersey Supreme Court, who served for 17 years where he wrote over 365 published opinions
- Wilbur Summers (1954–2019), American football punter who played in the NFL for the Detroit Lions
- Kay Sutton (1915–1988), film actress
- Travis Taylor (born 1990), professional basketball player
- Red Weiner (1911–1988), multi-sport professional athlete and coach, who played in the NFL for the Philadelphia Eagles
- Bill Wenzel (1918–1987), cartoonist best known as a widely published good girl artist for men's magazines
- Lewis Yablonsky (1924–2014), sociologist, criminologist, author, and psychotherapist best known for his innovative and experiential work with gang members
- Robert Zoellner (1932–2014), investor and stamp collector who was the second person to have assembled a complete collection of United States postage stamps
- Tony Zuzzio (1916–2002), lineman who played for the Detroit Lions during the 1942 NFL season
