= Sara Bost =

African-American politician

Mayor of Irvington, New Jersey
- In office 1994 – 2002
- Preceded by: Michael G. Steele
- Succeeded by: Wayne Smith

Personal details
- Born: Sara Brockington Bost; 1947 (age 78–79) Irvington, New Jersey
- Spouse: Fred Bost
- Known for: First female African-American to serve as Mayor of Irvington, New Jersey
- Criminal charge: Attempted witness tampering
- Criminal penalty: One year in a Federal prison
- Criminal status: Completed

Sara Brockington Bost (born 1947) was the first female African-American to serve as Mayor of Irvington, New Jersey. She was the first African-American to head the Women Mayors Division of the United States Conference of Mayors. In 2003 she was sentenced to a year in prison for witness tampering.

== Biography ==
Bost was born in 1947 in Irvington, New Jersey. She worked as a bank accountant and then was elected as the Essex County freeholder president. She also served as a board member for Essex County College. Starting in 1994, she served two terms as Mayor of Irvington, New Jersey.

Bost was indicted in March 2002, charged with accepting kickbacks amounting to $8,500 from two city contractors. She was also charged with witness tampering after she met with the former town administrator and counseled him to lie to federal investigators. The administrator, David Fuller, became a government witness against her. She was prosecuted by Chris Christie, the United States Attorney for the District of New Jersey.

In a plea deal in 2003, Bost pleaded guilty to the one charge of witness tampering, and the other charges were dropped. She was sentenced to a year in prison and served it at Federal Prison Camp, Alderson. In 2010 the New Jersey Election Law Enforcement Commission fined her $27,000 for failing to file required campaign finance reports by the mandated deadline and for accepting campaign donations that exceeded New Jersey's statutory limits.

Bost has been a resident of Barnegat Township, New Jersey. Her husband, Fred M. Bost, died in 2021.
