= Nicholas Reale =

American painter and educator

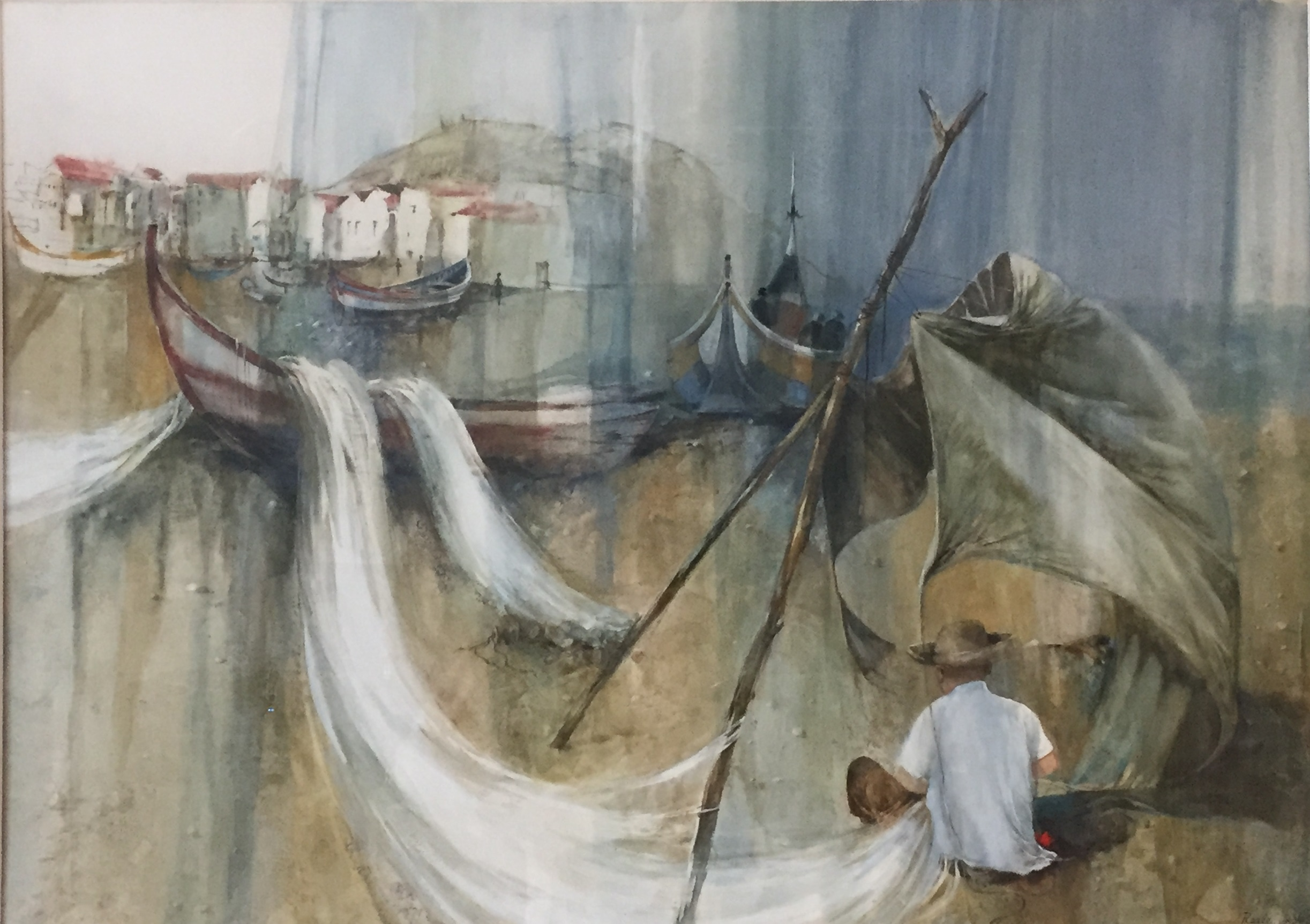
Mending Nets in Nazare, an original watercolor painted by Nicholas Reale. This painting received the New Jersey Watercolor Society Silver Medal of Honor in 1971.

Nicholas Albert Reale (March 20, 1922 – November 18, 1984) was an American watercolorist with a lengthy career in art and teaching.

Reale's works have been exhibited throughout the United States and Canada, including the Metropolitan Museum of Art. The recipient of more than sixty major awards, he is listed in Who's Who in American Art. His works are in the permanent collections of the National Academy of Design, the Newark Museum, the Jersey City Museum, the University of Arizona, and Monmouth University.

== Early life, education and military service ==
Born in Irvington, New Jersey, his parents had emigrated from southern Italy in the early 20th century, and Reale attended Newark Arts High School in Newark, New Jersey, where he eventually joined the faculty. He was directed to the Newark Arts High School by a biology teacher in the public schools, who had noticed his exceptional sketches in the margins of his science assignments and encouraged him to transfer schools.

Upon graduation, Reale enrolled in the Pratt Institute in Brooklyn, New York. Reale served in the United States Navy for the entirety of World War II, returning to complete his degree.

== Career ==
Upon graduation from Pratt he became a commercial artist in Manhattan, married Maria Padula (his wife of 35 years), and settled in Hillside, New Jersey, with summers in the West Belmar section of Wall Township, New Jersey. They had three children who survived them: Nancy Reale Gifford-Humphreys, Aldo Reale, and Barbara Reale, and seven grandchildren.

In 1968, Reale left the commercial-art world and spent the rest of his life painting and teaching. He was an influential instructor in painting and graphic design, teaching at Seton Hall University in South Orange, New Jersey, the Newark School of Fine and Industrial Art, Somerset Art Association, Princeton Art Association , Summit Arts Center, and Morris County Art Association. He also led workshops nationally.

Reale was an active associate member of the American Watercolor Society, a member of the Allied Artists of America, Audubon Artists and the New Jersey Watercolor Society. The New Jersey Watercolor Society named him Artist of the Year in 1969. In 1981, he was named an Associate National Academician by the National Academy.

Reale's work explored and overlapped several styles and palettes, with impressionistic and abstract styles predominant; seascapes were his forte. All of his known paintings have a small patch of bright red, which is usually the focal point of the composition; this became his trademark. He was influenced by the work of French impressionist and cubist Georges Braque.

== Death and legacy ==
Reale died suddenly and unexpectedly at age 62, during the opening days of a one-man exhibit at Gallery 9 in Chatham, New Jersey.

Reale's work and teaching have influenced many artists, including Alice de Caprio, the Aquamedia Group (ten women who were his students), Beth Born, Diana Patton, Patricia Tindall Sally Vaughan, and Ellen Vreeland.

The American Watercolor Society continues to present the Nicholas Reale Memorial Award in his honor

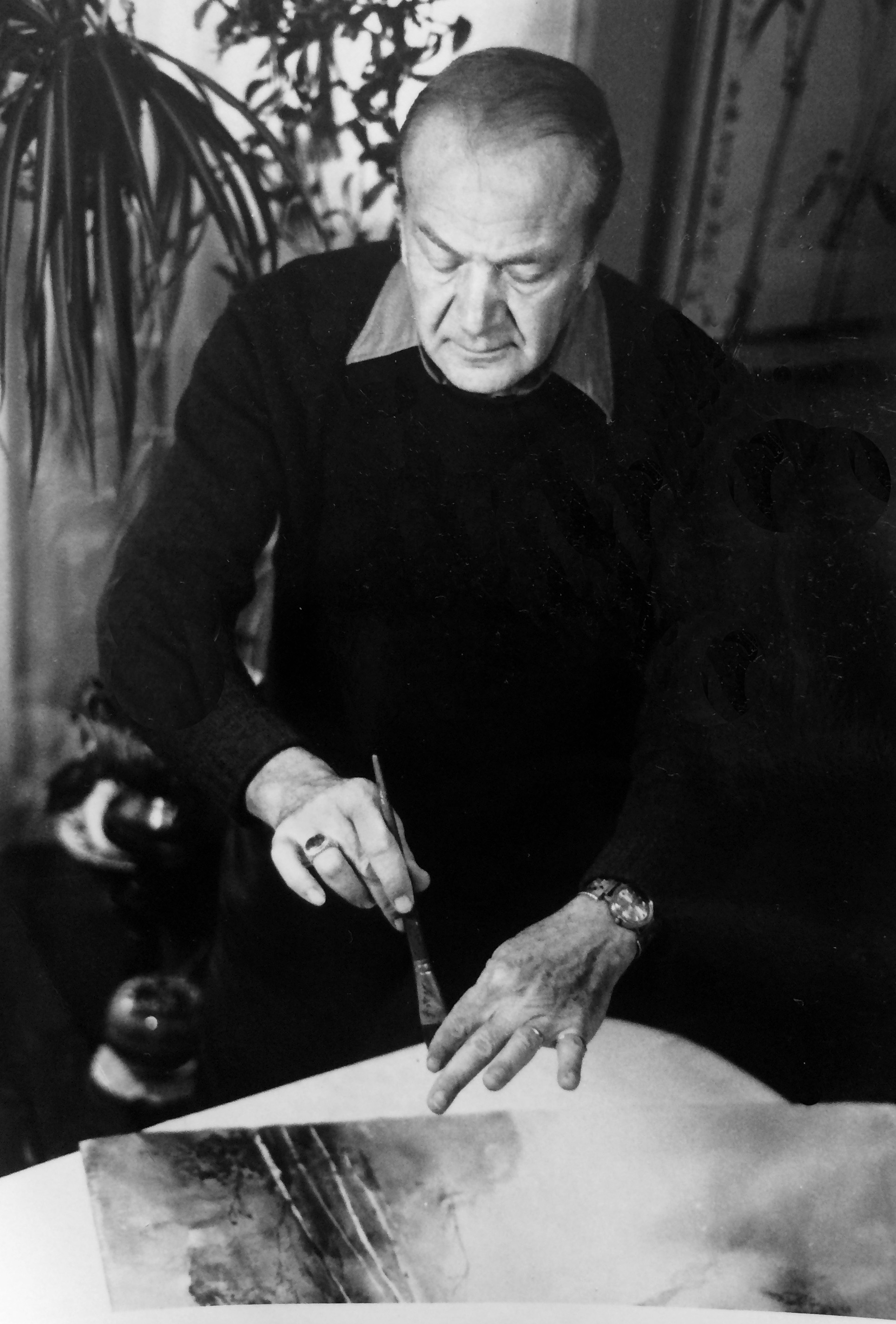
Nicholas Reale, working in his studio, Hillside, New Jersey

== Major awards ==
- American Watercolor Society – The Arches Papers Award (1972); The High Winds Medal (1976), The Doris Olsen Klep Memorial Award (1981)
- New Jersey Watercolor Society Silver Medal of Honor awarded in 1971 (for Mending Nets in Nazare) and 1982 (for Homage to Henry)
- Grumbacher Award at the New Jersey Watercolor Society, 1981 (for Warm Passage)

== See also ==
- List of American artists
- List of painters
- List of people from New Jersey
