= Kenneth Raffa =

American entomologist (born 1950)

- Born: 1950 (age 75–76); Irvington, New Jersey, US
- Spouse: Anne (m. 1981)

Academic background
- Education: BS, Biology, 1972, Saint Joseph's University; MS, Entomology, 1976, University of Delaware; PhD, Entomology, 1980, Washington State University
- Thesis: The role of host resistance in the colonization behavior, ecology and evolution of bark beetles (Coleoptera: Scolytidae) (1981)
- Website: raffa.russell.wisc.edu

Kenneth Franics Raffa (born in 1950) is an American entomologist.

== Early life and education ==
Raffa was born in 1950 in Irvington, New Jersey, US, but raised near Delaware. Following his Bachelor of Science degree in biology from Saint Joseph's University, he assisted with insect and disease surveys for the USDA Forest Service. As a result, he pursued graduate degrees in entomology from the University of Delaware and Washington State University. While conducting his PhD at Washington State, Raffa received a grant from the National Science Foundation (NSF) to support his research on bark beetles.

In 2015, Raffa was honored by the University of Delaware with their Distinguished Alumni award.

== Career ==
Following his PhD, Raffa became a research biologist at DuPont from 1981 to 1985 before joining the faculty at the University of Wisconsin–Madison (UWM). Upon joining the faculty, Raffa continued his research into the population dynamics and ecology of forest insects. In 2000, Raffa was named a Vilas Associate for the 2000–2001 academic year. He was later recognized for his entomology work with the 2008 Kellett Mid-Career Award. As a result of his research, Raffa was promoted to the Beers-Bascom Professor of Conservation and was elected a Fellow of the Entomological Society of America. In 2010, he served as an associate/subject editor for three major North American journals by 2010 and received the Entomological Society of America Founders' Memorial Award.

During his tenure at UWM, Raffa was praised by fellow entomology professor Susan Paskewitz for being the "preeminent forest entomologist in the world today." As a result, he was awarded the 2017 Hilldale Award as a UW-Madison faculty member who has made "distinguished contributions to teaching, research, and service." The following year, he received the 2018 ESA Plant-Insect Ecosystems Lifetime Achievement Award in Entomology. Raffa officially retired from UW-M at the conclusion of the 2018–19 academic year.

== Personal life ==
Raffa married his wife Anne in 1981 and they have two daughters together.
