= List of American and Canadian football leagues =

This is a list of current and defunct leagues of American football and Canadian football.

== Leagues in North America ==
=== Current professional leagues in North America ===
==== Professional outdoor leagues ====
Major:

- (United States) National Football League (NFL), 1920–

Originally American Professional Football Association (1920–1921)
Merged with the All-America Football Conference (1946-1949) and with the American Football League (1960–69)

- (Canada) Canadian Football League (CFL), 1958–

Formed from Interprovincial Rugby Football Union (1909) and Western Interprovincial Football Union (1936).
Grey Cup Canadian Football Championships since 1909

Minor:

- (Mexico) Liga de Fútbol Americano Profesional (LFA), 2016–
- (United States) United Football League (UFL), 2024–

Formed from merger of XFL (2020) and United States Football League (2022)

- (United States) Continental Football League (CoFL), 2026

==== Professional arena/indoor leagues ====
- (United States) Indoor Football League (IFL), 2009–

Formed from Intense Football League (2004) and United Indoor Football (2005)

- (United States) American Indoor Football (AIF), 2011–2016, 2024–
- (United States) National Arena League (NAL), 2017–
- (United States) American Arena League (AAL), 2018–2021, 2026–
  - American Arena League 2 (AAL2), 2023–
- (United States) United Indoor Football Association (UIFA), 2023–

Originally United Indoor Football League (2023)

- (United States) The Arena League (The AL or TAL), 2024–
- (United States) Arena Football One (2025) (AF1), 2025–
- (United States) (Germany) (Switzerland) (United Kingdom) International Arena League (IAL), 2026–

=== Current developmental leagues ===
- (United States) Gridiron Developmental Football League, 2010–
- (United States) Rivals Professional Football League, 2015–

=== Current semi-pro/amateur leagues ===
- (Canada) Northern Football Conference, 1954–
- (United States) Eastern Football League, 1961–
- (Canada) Alberta Football League, 1984–
- (United States) The Minor Football League, 1993–
- (United States) New England Football League, 1994–
- (United States) National Public Safety Football League, 1997–
- (United States) Rocky Mountain Football League, 1997–
- (United States) MidStates Football League, 1999–
- (Canada) Maritime Football League, 2001–
- (United States) The Pacific Coast Football League, 2006–
- (United States) Florida Football Alliance, 2007–
- (United States) East Coast Football Association, 2007–
- (United States) Northern Elite Football League, 2008–
- (United States) Atlantic Coast Football Alliance, 2009–
- (United States) Texas United Football Association, 2010–
- (United States) Amateur to Professional Developmental Football League, 2012–
- (United States) Central Midwest Football League, 2014–
- (United States) American 7s Football League, 2014–
- (United States) Atlantic Football Association, 2014–
- (United States) Florida Champion Football League, 2017–
- (United States) Cactus Football League, 2018–
- (United States) North Louisiana Football Alliance, 2019–
- (United States) Southern Elite Football League, 2021–
- (United States) Mid-West United Football league, 2021–
- (United States) Heartland Football Association, 2022–

=== Current flag football leagues ===
Pro

- (United States) American Flag Football League, 2018–

Other

- (United States) National Gay Flag Football League, 2002–
- (United States) DC Gay Flag Football League, 2009–

=== Current collegiate or junior leagues ===
- (United States) National Collegiate Athletic Association, 1906–
- (United States) National Federation of State High School Associations, 1920–
- (United States) California Community College Athletic Association, 1929–
- (United States) Collegiate Sprint Football League, 1934–
- (United States) National Junior College Athletic Association, 1938–
- (United States) National Association of Intercollegiate Athletics, 1940–
- (Canada) Quebec Junior Football League, 1970–
- (Canada) Canadian Junior Football League, 1974–
- (Mexico) Organización Nacional Estudiantil de Fútbol Americano, 1978–
- (Canada) Atlantic Football League, 2009–
- (United States) Intercollegiate Club Football Federation, 2010–
- (United States) National Club Football Association, 2010–
- (United States) Hohokam Junior College Athletic Conference, 2019–
- (United States) Great Plains Athletic Conference, 1969-

=== Current women's leagues ===
==== Outdoor leagues ====
- (United States) (Canada) Women's Football Alliance, 2009–
- United States Women's Football League, 2010–
- (Canada) Western Women's Canadian Football League, 2011–
- (United States) Utah Girls Tackle Football League, 2015–
- (United States) Women's National Football Conference, 2019–
- (Canada) Central Canadian Women's Football League, 2022–

==== Women's Indoor/Arena leagues ====
- (United States) National Football Confederacy, 2024–
- (United States) X League, 2009–

Operated as the Lingerie Football League from 2009 to 2012 and then as the Legends Football League from 2013 to 2019.

- (United States) Women's Arena Football League, 2012–

=== Planned leagues in North America ===
- (United States) ApexPro Football League (APFL), 2027
- (United States) Zenith Gridiron Football League (ZGFL), 2028
- (United States) Independent Professional Football League (IPFL), 2028
- (United States) Major League Football (MLF), TBD (proposed to begin in 2027)
- (United States) Major League Football (MLFB), TBD (cancelled seasons in 2016 and 2022)

=== Historical leagues in North America ===
==== Major outdoor leagues ====
The following leagues partly or fully merged with NFL:

- (United States) All-America Football Conference, 1946–1949
- (United States) American Football League, 1960–1969

Other major outdoor leagues:

- (United States) Western Pennsylvania Professional Football Circuit, 1892–1905
- (United States) National Football League, 1902
- (United States) Ohio Independent Championship (Ohio League), 1903–1919
- (Canada) Interprovincial Rugby Football Union, 1907–1959
- (United States) New York Pro Football League, c. 1913–1920
- (United States) American Football League, 1926, 1936–1937, and 1940–1941 (all unrelated, three separate leagues)
- (United States) California Winter League, 1927–1928
- (Canada) Western Interprovincial Football Union, 1936–1960
- United States Football League, 1945 (Never played)
- (United States) Trans-America Football League, 1945 (Never played)
- (United States) (Canada) (Mexico) Universal Football League, 1974 (Never played)
- (United States) World Football League, 1974–1975
- United States Football League, 1983–1985

==== Minor outdoor leagues ====
- (United States) Wilmington Football League (1922–1925, 1929–1935, 1940–1941, 1946–1955)
- (United States) Anthracite League (1924)
- (United States) Ohio Valley League, 1925–1929
- (United States) Eastern League of Professional Football (1926)
- (United States) Pacific Coast League, 1926
- (United States) Eastern League of Professional Football, 1926–1927
- (United States) Anthracite League, 1928–1929
- (United States) Eastern Football League, 1932–1933

Became Interstate Football League in 1933

- (United States) Greater New York League, 1934–1935

Originally the New Jersey Football Circuit (1934)

- (United States) American Football League, 1934
- (United States) American Legion League, 1934–1935
- (United States) Northwest Football League, 1935–1938
- (United States) Midwest Football League, 1935–1937, became American Professional Football Association in 1938, American Football League in 1939
- (United States) Dixie League, 1936–1947 – originally South Atlantic Football Association
- (United States) American Association 1936–1941/American Football League 1946–1950
- (United States) New England Football League, 1936
- (United States) Virginia-Carolina Football League, 1937
- (United States) California Football League, 1938
- (United States) Eastern Pennsylvania Football League, 1938
- (United States) American Football League, 1938–1939
- (United States) Pacific Coast Professional Football League, 1940–1948
- (United States) Northeast Football League, 1940–1942
- (United States) Northwest War Industries Football League, 1942
- (United States) Eastern Football League, 1944
- (United States) American Football League, 1944
- (United States) Virginia Negro League, 1946
- (United States) Central States Football League, 1948–1953
- (United States) Pacific Football Conference, 1957–1958
- (United States) (Canada) American Football Conference, 1959–1961

Low-level fall league that was fully organized in September 1959 with five independent teams who played the other teams sporadically. The original teams were Duquesne Ironmen (Pennsylvania), Melvindale Redskins (Michigan), Toledo Tornadoes, Dayton Triangles (Ohio) and Newark Rams (New Jersey). Players were from both pro and college teams. Teams also end up play in Sarnia, Zaneville (Ohio Colts), Port Huron and Detroit, while Toledo Tornadoes leave for the larger United Football League (1961–1964).

- (United States) (Canada) United Football League, 1961–1964
- (United States) Central States Football League, 1962–1975
- (United States) Atlantic Coast Football League, 1962–1971, 1973
- (United States) Midwest Football League, 1962–1978
- (United States) Southern Football League, 1963–1965
- (United States) (Canada) North Pacific Football League, 1963–1966
- (United States) New England Football League, 1964–1967

Renamed North Atlantic Football League in 1967

- (United States) (Canada) (Mexico) Continental Football League, 1965–1969
- (United States) North American Football League, 1965–1966
- (United States) Professional Football League of America, 1965–1967
- (United States) Texas Football League 1966–1968
- (United States) United American Football League, 1967
- (United States) South Carolina Football League, 1967
- (United States) Trans-American Football League, 1970–1971
- (United States) Midwest Professional Football League, 1970–1972
- (United States) Seaboard Football League, 1971–1974
- (United States) Southwestern Football League, 1972–1973
- (United States) California Football League, 1974–1982
- (United States) American Football Association, 1978–1983
- (United States) International Football League, 1984 (never played)
- (United States) (Canada) World League of American Football 1991–1992 (Note: The league was in hiatus and re-branded as the NFL Europe League in 1995.)/NFL Europe 1995–2007
- (United States) Professional Spring Football League, 1992
- (United States) Fan Ownership League, 1996 (never played)
- (United States) Regional Football League, 1999
- (United States) International Football Federation, 2000 (never played)
- (United States) Spring Football League, 2000
- (United States) XFL, 2001
- (United States) World Football League, 2008–2010
- (United States) United Football League, 2009–2012
- (United States) Hawaii Professional Football League, 2011 (never played)
- (United States) Stars Football League, 2011–2013
- (United States) North American Football League, 2014 (never played)
- (United States) Fall Experimental Football League, 2014–2015
- (United States) The Spring League, 2017–2021
- (United States) Trinity Professional Spring Football League, 2018 (never played)
- (United States) Your Call Football, 2018–2019
- (United States) Freedom Football League (FFL), 2019 (never played)
- (United States) Alliance of American Football (AAF), 2019
- (Mexico) Fútbol Americano de México (FAM), 2019–2022
- (United States) XFL, 2020; 2023
- United States Football League (USFL), 2022–2023

==== Indoor leagues ====
- (United States) World Series of Football, 1902–03
- (United States) Arena Football League, 1987–2008, 2010–2019
- (United States) Professional Indoor Football League, 1998–2000 (Bought out by Af2 in 2001)
- (United States) Indoor Football League, 1999–2000 (Bought out by Af2 in 2001;not related to the Indoor Football League that began play in 2009)
- (United States) Indoor Professional Football League, 1999–2001
- (United States) Arenafootball2 (af2), 2000–2009 (assets acquired in the same transaction as that noted above for Arena Football League)
- (United States) National Indoor Football League, 2001–2007
- (United States) American Professional Football League, 2003–2013
- (United States) Intense Football League, 2004–2008 (merged into current incarnation of the Indoor Football League)
- (United States) United Indoor Football, 2005–2008 (merged into current incarnation of the Indoor Football League)
- (United States) Continental Indoor Football League, 2006–2014
- (United States) World Indoor Football League, 2007
- (United States) Southern Indoor Football League, 2008–2011 (teams divided into either the Lone Star Football League, the Professional Indoor Football League, or American Indoor Football)
- (United States) Ultimate Indoor Football League, 2011–2014
- (United States) Lone Star Football League, 2012–2014
- (United States) Professional Indoor Football League, 2012–2015
- (United States) Champions Professional Indoor Football League, 2013–2014
- (United States) X-League Indoor Football, 2014–2015
- (United States) Champions Indoor Football, 2015-2023
- (United States) American West Football Conference, 2019–2023
- (United States) National Gridiron League/United Football League, 2019-2023 (never played)
- (United States) Arena Football Association, 2021-2022
- (United States) Fan Controlled Football, 2021-2022
- (United States) American Indoor Football Alliance, 2022–2023
- (United States) Arena Football League (AFL), 2024
- (United States) Great Lakes Arena Football (GLAF), 2023–2024

Originally Great Lakes Arena Alliance (2023)

==== Collegiate and amateur leagues ====
- (Canada) Quebec Rugby Football Union, 1883–1944
- (Canada) Ontario Rugby Football Union, 1883–1960
- (United States) American Football Union, 1886–1895
- (United States) Texas Sixman Football League, 1999–2012

==== Women's leagues ====
- (United States) Women's Professional Football League, 1965–1973
- (United States) National Women's Football League, 1974–1982
- (United States) Women's Professional Football League, 1999–2007
- (United States) National Women's Football Association, 2000–2008
- (United States) Women's American Football League, formed 2001, became the AFWL in 2002
- (United States) American Football Women's League (AFWL), 2002
- (United States) Women's Football Association, 2002–2003
- (United States) Women's Football League, 2002–2007
- (United States) Women's Football League Association, 2021 (never played)

== Leagues outside North America ==
=== Current professional leagues outside North America ===
- Europe – European Football Alliance (EFA), 2026-
- Europe – American Football League Europe (AFLE), 2026-
- Japan – X-League, began play in 1971.

=== Current minor professional, semi professional and amateur leagues outside North America ===
Central and South America:

- Brazil – CBFA Brasil Futebol Americano
- Colombia – FECOFA Federación Colombiana de Football Americano
- Uruguay – LUFA Liga Uruguaya de Football Americano
- Guatemala – LIGFA Liga Guatemalteca de Football Americano

Europe:

- Austria/ (Czech Republic) / (Hungary) – AFL Austrian Football League
- Belgium – BFL Belgian Football League
- Czech Republic – CLAF Česká Liga Amerického Fotbalu
- Denmark – NL National Ligaen
- Finland – VL Vaahteraliiga
- France – LEFA Ligue Élite de Football Américain
- Germany – GFL German Football League
- Hungary – HFL Hungarian Football League
- Ireland – AFI American Football Ireland
- Italy – IFL Italian Football League
- Netherlands – Eredivisie
- Norway – Eliteserien
- Poland – PFL Polish Football League
- Portugal – LPFA Liga Portuguesa de Futebol Americano
- Romania – CNFA Campionatul Naţional de Fotbal American
- Russia – UAFR Russian American Football Championship
- Serbia – NLS Nacionalna Liga Srbije
- Spain – LNFA Liga Nacional de Fútbol Americano
- Sweden – Superserien
- Switzerland – NLA Nationalliga A
- Turkey – TKFL Türkiye Korumalı Futbol Ligi
- United Kingdom – BAFANL BAFA National Leagues
- (Romania) / (Bulgaria) / (Serbia) – DAFL Danube American Football League
- (Latvia) / (Estonia) / (Lithuania) Baltic League
- (European Union) Europe – CEFL Central European Football League

Asia:

- Israel – IFL Israel Football League
- South Korea – Korea American Football Association
- Philippines – ATFFP Philippine–American Football League
- China – CNFL Chinese National Football League
- India – EFLI Elite Football League of India
- Jordan - JLAF Jordanian American Football League

Oceania:

- Australia – Gridiron Australia
- Australia – Australian Gridiron League
- Australia – Ladies Gridiron League
- New Zealand – New Zealand American Football Association

Africa:

- Egypt – EFAF Egyptian Federation of American Football

=== Defunct minor leagues around the world ===
- (Germany) / (United Kingdom) / (Netherlands) / (Spain) / (United States) / (Canada) World League of American Football/NFL Europe/NFL Europa, 1991–1992, 1995–2007

Central and South America:

- (Brazil) – Torneio Touchdown 2009–2015

Europe:

- (Europe) – European League of Football (ELF) 2021–2025
- (Europe) – European Football League (EFL) 1986-2018
- (Europe) – Intercontinental Football League – Intended to begin play in 1975, folded before first game
- (United Kingdom) – BCAFL British Collegiate American Football League, 1985–200
- (United Kingdom) – BAFL British American Football League, 1987–2010
- (Iceland) – ISAF Icelandic Society for American Football, 1988–1991
- (Europe) – International League of American Football – Intended to begin play in 1990, folded before first game
- – Football League of Europe, 1994–1995
- (Russia) / (Belarus) – EESL Eastern European Super League
- Europe – BIG6 BIG6 European Football League
- Europe – CL IFAF Europe Champions League
- Croatia – HFL Hrvatska Football Liga
- Slovakia – SLAF Slovenská futbalová liga
- Slovenia – SNFL Slovenian Football League
- Ukraine – UAFL Ukrainian American Football League

Asia:

- (Philippines) – Philippine Tackle Football League

Oceania:

- (Australia) – Australian American Football League 1984–1998
- – National Gridiron League of Australia 1991–1995

=== Collegiate and amateur leagues ===
- (Japan) – List of Japanese collegiate American football programs
- (United Kingdom) – British Universities American Football League

== See also ==
- International Federation of American Football (IFAF), international governing body for American football
- European Federation of American Football (EFAF)
- Women's football in the United States
- British American Football Association (BAFA)
- Association of Professional Football Leagues – compact of NFL and three minor leagues, 1946–1948
- Football leagues in North America
- List of female American football teams
