= Minor league football (gridiron) =

Gridiron football played below major league level

Minor League Football
- Sport: Gridiron football
- No. of teams: Varies
- Countries: United States and Mexico
- Broadcasters: Broadcast; UFL: ESPN/ABC/Fox; LFA: Nuestra Visión/Multimedios/Televisa/RCG Televisión; IFL: CBS Sports Network; Live streaming; UFL: ESPN+; IFL and NAL: YouTube
- Related competitions: UFL, LFA, GDFL, RPFL and Indoor football leagues

Minor league football, also known as alternative football or secondary football, is an umbrella term for professional gridiron football that is played below the major league level.

The National Football League and Canadian Football League are both designated as major leagues, but contrary to the other major sports leagues in North America—Major League Baseball, the National Basketball Association, and the National Hockey League—no formal development farm system was in use after the NFL severed ties with all minor league teams in 1948. The developmental league concept was shuttered again with the cancellation of NFL Europe in 2006.

Since 2018, the CFL has had a partnership agreement with the Professional American Football League of Mexico (LFA) for player development, but does not consider it a minor league in the traditional sense. In 2023, the NFL signed a collaboration agreement with the XFL on rules, equipment, and safety testing (which was later transferred to the UFL), but the agreement does not cover sharing players for developmental purposes.

There have been professional football leagues of varying levels since the invention of the sport, and over the years there have been attempts to organize development or farm leagues such as the Association of Professional Football Leagues and the World League of American Football, later known as NFL Europe and then NFL Europa, but they failed to produce profits and were eventually shut down. As a result, over time the North American leagues settled into an informal hierarchy, with many aspiring entrepreneurs trying to establish rival, alternative, or supplemental leagues to the NFL, similar to baseball's independent leagues. Apart from the All-America Football Conference and the American Football League, which merged with the NFL, none of the other leagues have succeeded, particularly because the leagues' inability to generate television revenue to keep them afloat in their first years of existence.

In modern times, the NFL has developed players not ready for the active roster through each team's practice squad, or relied on college football and separate entities like the now-defunct Arena Football League as their feeder organizations. Since the beginning of the 21st century, three fledgling pro football leagues—the United Football League, the Fall Experimental Football League and the Alliance of American Football (AAF)—had hoped to create a relationship with the NFL as developmental minor leagues, but all folded without any such connection being made. Nevertheless, some players did find a path to the NFL through those leagues, especially the high-level ones like the AAF, XFL, and United States Football League (USFL).

Currently, there are four active minor leagues in North America: the United Football League (UFL), the Gridiron Developmental Football League, the Rivals Professional Football League, and the Liga de Fútbol Americano Profesional, with the latter the only Mexican league. The UFL is considered a high-level league, and the rest are viewed as low-level leagues.

== History ==
=== Early circuits (1880s and 1890s) ===
The birth of semi-professional football can be traced back to the 1880s, when most sports clubs in America had a team playing football, and ostensibly played without paid players. In reality, most teams often found ways around that, and acquired the best players with the promise of jobs and trophies or watches to play against top regional clubs and colleges. While the practice of professional and semi-pro teams playing college and amateur teams was common in the 1880s and 1890s, most notably with the establishment of a coalition of teams that operated from 1886 to 1895 in the New York metropolitan area called the American Football Union, in the 20th century college and professional football began to diverge, and college-professional interplay effectively ended after the NCAA formed in 1906. During this time, the most prominent circuit was the Western Pennsylvania Professional Football Circuit.

=== Leagues form (1900s-1920s) ===
The first attempt to form a pro league was the National Football League of 1902, which, despite its name, was a Pennsylvania regional league, with two teams based in Philadelphia and the third from Pittsburgh. The next step came when promoter Tom O'Rourke established the World Series of Football, also in 1902. The series played indoors at New York City's Madison Square Garden and consisted of five teams: three from the state of New York, one from New Jersey, and another team called New York comprising two Philadelphia teams, the Athletics and Phillies. The 1903 series also featured the Franklin Athletic Club from Pennsylvania.

At the same time, the Massillon Tigers, the Columbus Panhandles, and the Canton Bulldogs, all from Ohio, started attracting much of the top professional football talent in the United States of America: Harry McChesney, Bob Shiring, the Nesser brothers, Blondy Wallace, Cub Buck, and later Jim Thorpe, and gave rise to the Ohio League. The league was actually a circuit— an informal and loose association of independent teams playing other local teams and competing for the Ohio Independent Championship. The group pioneered the concept of avoiding competition with college football games by playing games on Sundays, which was illegal in other states due to the existing blue laws. This eventually became the professional standard.

The Ohio League decade-long monopoly began to lose hold in the 1910s, with the formation of the New York Pro Football League (NYPFL), first league to use a playoff format, and other associations in the Midwest, particularly in Illinois. The rise in level of play resulted in barnstorming tours between the circuits, which laid the foundations for the first truly national major league: the American Professional Football Association in 1920, which later became the NFL.

=== The Golden Era (1930s-1940s) ===
The first minor leagues period of prosperity or "heyday" started in the 1920s and lasted until the end of World War II. By the 1930s, football was not a fledgling enterprise, but pro football was, as even the National Football League had trouble attracting fans, and was located mostly in the northeastern quarter of the United States. In other parts of the country, several regional leagues tried their luck in the pro game, along with flourishing regional circuits of independent teams, recapturing the pro football roots. The era is also considered the best of all time, due to the quality of play, as there were only 250 players in the NFL, while the regional leagues could sometimes offer better pay and jobs, and offered black players opportunity to play during the period of 1933–1946, when they were excluded from all NFL teams.

In 1934, the American Football League (AFL) was the first true attempt to establish pro football in the American South and Southwest regions. The league was formed by the strongest independent teams in the region, including the Memphis Tigers, who claimed the national pro championship in 1929, after beating the NFL champion Green Bay Packers. The AFL had only one season of competition and folded after only the Memphis Tigers and Charlotte Bantams completed their seasons.

Another strong southern league was the Dixie League, which represented Mid Atlantic teams. The league was one of the most successful minor leagues in history, playing eight seasons in eleven years, while claiming to be the highest level minor football league of the era. Unlike most pro-football minor leagues, the Dixie League had a relative stable membership until the Pearl Harbor attack forced the league into hiatus. The league returned in 1946, but folded in 1947 after playing only one week.

The Dixie League's biggest counterpart was the American Association (AA) football league. The AA was formed by the nucleus of independent teams that played in the New York and New Jersey circuits, and was led by president Joe Rosentover. The league teams sought relationships with the NFL, and several teams, including the Newark Bears, Brooklyn Eagles, and Jersey City Giants, functioned as a farm system for the major NFL teams. The league allowed black players to participate, including the last African-American in the NFL in 1933, Joe Lillard. Most teams scheduled games against the independent Fritz Pollard's Harlem Brown Bombers. The league closed operations during World War II, and after a four-year hiatus, the AA was renamed the American Football League and expanded to include teams in Ohio and Pennsylvania. The league's demise was caused by the NFL severing ties with all minor league teams in 1948.

The last of the "Big Three Leagues" was the Pacific Coast Professional Football League, which started in 1940. The roots of pro football in the west are attributable to the Red Grange barnstorming tour with the Chicago Bears in 1926, as some short-lived leagues, including the 1926 Pacific Coast Professional Football League (PCPFL) and 1934–1935 American Legion League, were formed. The PCPFL was formed thanks to the financial backbone of the sport in California, the Los Angeles Bulldogs, billed as the "best football team in existence outside the NFL", and the only prominent minor football league to operate during the war years. The league became home to the top African American football talents in the country, including Kenny Washington, Woody Strode, Ozzie Simmons, Mel Reid, and briefly Jackie Robinson during the NFL enforced color barrier. The league played its last season in 1948, two years after the NFL moved the Los Angeles Rams to Los Angeles. The Big Three reached an agreement with the NFL, and in 1946 formed the Association of Professional Football Leagues as a formal farm system with the league. The agreement lasted less than two years, after the NFL cancelled it altogether in 1948. The termination triggered the end of the era.

Other prominent leagues in this era were the Anthracite League of Pennsylvania, the Eastern League of Professional Football based in Pennsylvania and New Jersey, the Ohio Valley League, the Midwest Football League, and the Northwest War Industries League in Washington and Oregon. During the 1930s and 1940s, there were also strong independent circuits in Greater New York metropolitan area and the Northeast.

=== The second wave (1960-1970s) ===
The minor leagues experienced a renaissance in the 1960s and 1970s; their growing relevance occurred alongside the AFL and NFL rivalry. Several prominent leagues operated during that period and were mostly regional. The original United Football League (UFL) lasted from 1961 to 1964 and was concentrated in the Midwest, and was the first football league to operate teams in both the United States and Canada, as the Quebec Rifles played in the league in 1964. The Northeast Atlantic Coast Football League (ACFL) formed in 1962 and was run by Joe Rosentover, former president of the 1930s AA.

In April 1964, the two leagues, along with the Central States Football League, the Midwest Football League, and the Southern Football League, formed the Association of Minor Football Leagues. The association also included the non-paying semi-pro New England Football Conference, and appointed UFL commissioner George T. Gareff as the CEO. The association represented teams in fifty cities spanning twenty-one U.S. states plus Quebec, and scheduled exhibition games between leagues, but disbanded after two years without making any strides.

When the UFL folded and the Newark Bears of the ACFL unsuccessfully applied to join the AFL, two new national leagues formed. The first was the North American Football League (NAFL), which ran from 1965 to 1966, and tried to establish major league affiliations with either the NFL or the AFL. The second, the Continental Football League (CoFL), which ran from 1965 to 1971, was probably the biggest in the era, and attracted three teams from the ACFL: the Hartford Charter Oaks, the Newark Bears, and the Norfolk Neptunes.

Some of the other notable leagues were the Professional Football League of America (PFLA), which lasted from 1965 to 1967 and played in the Midwest, essentially replacing the UFL, the North Pacific Football League (NPFL), and the Texas Football League (TFL), which operated in the southern United States. Those leagues would later merge with the CoFL, as several teams from the NPFL joined the league in 1966, and the PFLA followed in 1968, resulting in the dissolution of both leagues. In 1969, the CoFL announced the all eight teams from TFL were being added to its ranks as a separate division, and were scheduled to play mostly against each other, along with a few inter-league contests.

The two bigger leagues, the CoFL and ACFL, had different strategies: the CoFL aimed to remain independent, while the ACFL functioned as a developmental league and, like previous Rosentover leagues, allowed its teams to become farm teams for the AFL and NFL. Over their existence, the CoFL arguably had better talent move on to NFL and Canadian Football League (CFL) stardom, including Ken Stabler, Don Jonas, and Sam Wyche, but folded in 1969, and again in 1971 as an incarnation called the Trans-American Football League formed with remnants of the TFL; plans to take on the Canadian Football League head-to-head were abandoned. Although the revival as the TAFL was largely a failure, the league foreshadowed the future of minor football, as it played its season in the spring to avoid direct competition against football in the fall.

The ACFL also produced some significant talent, such as Pro Bowler Marvin Hubbard, first female professional football player Patricia Palinkas, who was placeholder for her husband Stephen, and cult figure King Corcoran. It also lasted longer. The league operated continuously through 1971, with a return season in 1973, which was played mostly by promoted teams from the lower-level Seaboard Football League (SFL), which in turn, brought up semi-pro teams to replace them. However, the attempted major World Football League (WFL) sapped both leagues of most of their talent, forcing them to fold by 1974. The league's first collapse in 1972, along with the demise of the Midwest Professional Football League, ended the era of NFL teams having individual farm teams.

During its existence, the SFL hovered between a minor league and semi-pro, as some of its players, most notably Joe Klecko, were never paid, and others received only fifty dollars per game. Despite that, the league had some notable alumni, including Vince Papale, Jack Dolbin, and Klecko. Additionally, the league was the last minor league to play an inter-league exhibition match against an NFL team, when the New York Jets rookies defeated Long Island Chiefs 29–3.

One other minor league attempt in the 1970s was the American Football Association (AFA), which operated from 1977 to 1983, was less successful, as it struggled to acquire recognizable players and failed to secure a TV deal. The AFA followed the model set by the TAFL, and played its from May to August.

The formation of the first United States Football League (USFL) in 1982 led to a decline in AFA talent, a move to semi-pro status, and a cancellation of the league entirely after the 1983 season. The USFL dominated minor league football from 1983 to 1985, but folded after a failed lawsuit against the NFL led by team owner Donald Trump.

Near the end of the era, there was one last attempt to organize non-NFL pro teams under one umbrella, with the establishment of the Minor Professional Football Association, which represented more than 200 teams and about 10,000 players. From 1980 through 1985, the association sponsored an annual post-season championship tournament for minor league teams, with an attempt to establish a minor-league system. In 1981 the association reached an agreement with the NFL to hold a special national all-star game for minor leaguers, the day before the Super Bowl, with scouts in attendance. The NFL had the right to sign any player from the association for a $1,500 payment to the team that held his contract. But the agreement did not continue, and in 1986 the association reformed into the American Football Association (AFA) and focused on providing services to semi-pro and amateur teams around the US. The development of arena football and the birth of the Arena Football League (AFL) in 1987 effectively ended the era, reducing most outdoor leagues to amateur or semi-pro status.

=== WLAF and NFL Europe (1990s) ===
After the turmoil in the 1980s, the NFL decided to form its own league in 1991, the World League of American Football, as a spring developmental league. For the first time, an American sport league had a European division as part of its ten-team league, while the other teams were located in continental US and Canada. The league was used to test rule changes and technical innovations and planned as a farm system for NFL teams. However, the first two seasons produced low TV ratings, and the league was put on hiatus until 1995. When it came back, the league was based entirely in Europe, reduced to six teams, and re-branded in 1998 as NFL Europe. The league kept the same format until 2007, when the NFL terminated it. Ultimately, the league was one of the longest tenured high-level minor leagues in history, lasting fifteen years in total and producing players like Hall of Famer Kurt Warner and Super Bowl quarterbacks Brad Johnson and Jake Delhomme. Other notable players include Dante Hall, David Akers, James Harrison, Adam Vinatieri, and William Perry.

=== Modern era (2000-2010s) ===
In the late 1990s and early 2000s, a wave of entrepreneurs tried forming new leagues in the ever growing football market.

The first league was the self-styled "major league of spring football" Regional Football League (RFL) that played a single season in 1999. The league was initially planned to begin in 1998, but financial difficulties delayed it by a year and changed the business plan, transforming it into a lower-budget league featuring just six teams from mid-sized cities mostly located the southern United States. The league did not prosper, as it failed to secure a television contract and was forced to play a shortened eight-week season. Although the league was unsuccessful, it pioneered the idea of assigning players teams based on the region where they played in college.

Parallel to the RFL, there were two more attempts to start up new leagues. The first, the International Football Federation, folded so rapidly it is considered the shortest football league in history, ceasing operations before completing the preliminary planning stages. The second, the Spring Football League, was founded by several ex-NFL players: Bo Jackson, Drew Pearson, Eric Dickerson, and Tony Dorsett. It failed to attract big investors on account of the tech-market crash of 2000, and was cancelled after only two weeks.

The next attempt was probably the most significant since the emergence of the AFL in 1960, as NBC and the WWE collaborate to form the (original) XFL in 2001. Although 14 million viewers tuned in for the first game, the Nielsen ratings later plummeted and triggered NBC to pulled out of its broadcast contract, and the league folded after one season. The league featured several changes in rules and broadcast style, and gave birth to the Skycam in sports broadcasting.

From the late 2000s into the early 2010s, many startup leagues had trouble attracting investors. Five high-profile attempts by the All American Football and United National Gridiron leagues in 2007, the New United States Football League in 2010 and 2014, and the A-11 Football League in 2014, never materialized. Two other leagues in the era were the low-level New World Football League (NWFL) and the Stars Football League (SFL), both of which survived three seasons: the NWFL from 2008 to 2010, and the SFL from 2011 to 2013.

The 2009 United Football League (UFL) was the most prominent league in the era, playing 3½ seasons before folding. The UFL was fairly successful, attracting big crowds in Omaha, Sacramento, and Hartford, signing prominent former NFL stars, and airing all league games on Versus, HDnet, and over the Internet, and had plans to expand. It functioned as a single-entity league following the Major League Soccer model. The UFL was the first professional fall league other than the National Football League to play in the United States since the mid-1970s. The league suffered from systemic financial shortfalls throughout its existence, which eventually led to unpaid players and coaches, and the league shutting down midway through its 2012 season.

The Fall Experimental Football League (FXFL), founded in 2014, aimed to become a professional feeder system for the NFL. The league owner, Brian Woods, wanted his franchises to be primarily based in minor league baseball stadiums, and use the infrastructure in place to attract fans. The FXFL attracted the final NFL roster cuts, for the purpose of keeping them "in football shape, physically and mentally". The league was cancelled after two abbreviated seasons, and was reformatted as the developmental Spring League in 2016.

=== New resurgence (2020s) ===
In 2018, several figures with connections to the original 2001 XFL entered the spring-football market with rival leagues. The first was the Alliance of American Football (AAF), founded by Charlie Ebersol and Bill Polian, which began playing in 2019, but ceased operations eight weeks in, after a sudden funding shortfall (caused by the federal asset freeze of a key investor, Reggie Fowler) led to a rushed midseason sale to Thomas Dundon, who halted the season after eight weeks after unsuccessfully demanding a formal NFL affiliation and subsidy.

2020 saw a relaunched version of the XFL, as Vince McMahon hired Oliver Luck as commissioner. The league first began play in winter 2020, with more success and a better reception than its first iteration, and aired on ABC, ESPN, and Fox Sports. After five weeks of play, the XFL announced its season would end because of growing COVID-19 pandemic concerns. The league was on hiatus in 2021 and 2022, after it filed for bankruptcy and put up for sale by McMahon and was later sold to Dany Garcia, Dwayne "The Rock" Johnson and RedBird Capital Partners, and began its second season on February 18, 2023.

Six other leagues have entered the planning stage, but have yet to launch. The first is the Spring League of American Football, a planned high-level minor league that was first announced in September 2016, by two former Madison Square Garden executives, but did not acquire any funding to begin play. As of 2023, the league appears defunct, with no official website and no news since 2018. Major League Football was founded in 2014, but so far only has two cancelled seasons in 2016 and 2022. The American Patriot League was founded in 2018 and planned to start in 2019, held two league showcase and allocated players and coaches to teams, but still hasn't launched because of the COVID-19 pandemic. Another planned league is the Freedom Football League, also founded in 2018, run by former NFL players Jeff Garcia, Ricky Williams, Terrell Owens, and Simeon Rice, with an initial 2020 starting season, but with no recent updates to its timeline.

The last two were developmental-level leagues. The first was Pacific Pro Football, founded in 2017 and designed for non-NFL eligible players; it was abandoned in mid-2020 after several investors backed out, and was reformatted to a scouting event called HUB Football. The other, Your Call Football, did start, lasted from 2018 to 2019, and featured concepts that gave the fans the power to control the outcome, which were also adopted by the indoor Fan Controlled Football league, but was abandoned when its parent company moved on to adapting the technology in other sporting environments.

From 2017 to 2021, a developmental league called The Spring League (TSL) was aimed at professional athletes but acted as "instructional league and showcase for professional football talent" with abbreviated seasons. Its fall 2020 and spring 2021 seasons were notable for their operations inside bubbles without spectators, allowing them to play through the pandemic. On June 3, 2021, TSL owner Brian Woods announced that he had acquired the remaining extant trademarks of the United States Football League and launched a USFL-branded league in 2022, with Fox Sports owning the league and reportedly committing $150 million over three years to its operations, essentially ending the five years run of TSL, and establishing the USFL as a new high-level minor league.

In late 2023, the XFL and USFL merged to form a new league, taking the name United Football League. The league comprises four former XFL teams and four former USFL teams. After the 2025 season, Mike Repole took a controlling minority stake in the league and substantially overhauled it.

== System and structure ==
There have been professional football leagues of varying levels since the invention of the sport, with the NFL dominant through most of the 20th century and into the 21st. There have been many attempts to start rival major leagues, most recently the original United States Football League (USFL), but most leagues that followed have been high-level minor leagues such as the XFL, the UFL and the AAF. Whether major or minor, most football leagues have tried to establish teams in large, untapped U.S. markets.

Most of the minor leagues have been separated through the years into three de facto categories: high-level, including the Pacific Coast Professional Football League (PCPFL), the original XFL, and the Alliance of American Football (AAF); low-level, such as the American Football Association (AFA) and Seaboard Football League (SFL); and semi-professional leagues. Today, there are also mid-level leagues, including the Regional Football League (RFL) and Fall Experimental Football League (FXFL) and developmental leagues, such as The Spring League (TSL) and Your Call Football.

The categories are usually determined by the following rules: the high-level leagues salaries are above the median personal income in the United States, mid-level leagues pay at approximately median level, and the low-level leagues pay around or below the minimum wage in the United States. The developmental leagues do not pay salaries or contract with non-NFL eligible players, and are designed to showcase the players' skills for future opportunities.

Since 1998, there have been more than twenty traditional or indoor football leagues that played an average of 3½ years before folding or merging with others; some never reached the stage of playing games. There are four active minor leagues in North America: the high-level United Football League (UFL); and three low-level leagues, the Gridiron Developmental Football League, the Rivals Professional Football League, and the Mexican Liga de Fútbol Americano Profesional.

=== Indoor American football ===
The high cost of supporting an entire roster of professional players and stadium fees led to an indoor variation with the launch of the Arena Football League (AFL) in 1987. In its heyday, the it functioned as de facto minor league to the NFL, as six NFL team owners—Atlanta Falcons, Dallas Cowboys, Denver Broncos, Detroit Lions, New Orleans Saints and Tennessee Titans—had purchased teams in the AFL, and many players and coaches made the transition between leagues. On February 8, 1999, the NFL also purchased, but never exercised, an option to buy a major interest in the AFL. Prior to the first AFL's collapse in 2008, the league had its own minor developmental league called af2, which never actually functioned as a farm system, and was used to test potential new markets (or growing the game to markets that could not sustain an AFL team) and rule changes, but it dissolved after the 2009 season amid financial problems rooted in the 2008 financial crisis and several of its teams joined the second AFL, which began play in 2010.

Currently, the Indoor Football League (IFL) has a player personnel partnership with the XFL and later with the UFL, to function as their de facto minor league, although this agreement is not exclusive and the UFL has also recruited from Arena Football One (AF1). Beginning with the 2026 season, the American Arena League (AAL) intends to formalize the role of its developmental affiliate, AAL2, by operating it as a traditional minor league system focused on player development. This structure is designed to create a direct developmental pipeline supplying talent to the professional AAL.

Today, the indoor variation of football also has an unofficial minor-league hierarchy, although no major indoor league exists currently after the second AFL went bankrupt in 2019. Pro leagues pay varying salaries on a per-game basis, while the high-level leagues have a minimum pay baseline and also provide housing, health insurance, and two meals per day to players during the season.

The categories are more fluid than the outdoor variation, but usually determined by per-game salaries, geographic footprint and arena size:

- National – Indoor Football League, Arena Football One
- Pro regional – National Arena League, The Arena League
- Low-level – American Arena League, American Indoor Football, International Arena League
- Fall/ Developmental - American Arena League 2, Gridiron Indoor Football League, Midwest Arena Football League, United Indoor Football Association, United States Arena League, Winter Indoor Football

=== Semi-pro football ===
Semi-pro leagues have existed since the beginning of American football, but were far more common in the early and mid 20th century than they are today. Football is especially suited for semi-pro play, and most leagues often operate at a semi-professional level due to cost concerns. Furthermore, because they play only one game per week, the players are able to pursue outside employment. In the 21st century, the semi-pro circuits usually attract only local players and teams don't pay salaries, although in the past most teams helped players find local jobs within the community. Over the years, semi-pro leagues were effectively a farm system for the NFL, attracting college players on the cusp of playing in the NFL who needed to stay in shape.

The semi-pro game experienced two peak periods: first in the 1950s, then in the 1970s and 1980s, when minor leagues started disappearing. Instead, the level below the NFL tended to take the form of local, sometimes unofficial leagues matching teams from different neighborhoods or suburbs of big cities with little to no pay. The semi-pro leagues role in history is best portrayed in the 1987 24-day NFLPA Strike, when semi-pro players were called up as replacements after the third week of the NFL season was cancelled. Their stories are documented in the 2017 ESPN film Year of the Scab. The decline of semi-pro football is attributable to the rise of college football in the 1980s, and the subsequent growth of a vast pool of young talent from which the NFL can draw.

Notable semi-pro players include Johnny Unitas, who played quarterback, safety, and punter on a Pittsburgh suburb team called the Bloomfield Rams for six dollars per game before joining the Baltimore Colts; Eric Swann, who played for the Bay State Titans in the Boston suburb of Lynn and was the first, and so far the only, player to be drafted into the NFL draft first round from a semi-pro organization; Toby Keith, who played semi-pro football in the early 1980s while launching his singing career; and Ray Seals, who did not play college football, but made his way to the NFL through the semi-pro rank Syracuse Express.

The Watertown Red & Black, a semi-professional team from Upstate New York, is the oldest existing football club, tracing its history to 1896.

==== Minor League Football System ====
After the decline of the minor leagues in the 1980s, the semi-pro circuit tried to fill that niche. In the summer of 1989, the Minor League Football System (MLFS) was formed as an attempt to develop a nationwide semi-pro football league. The circuit had aspirations to become a feeder system for the NFL and featured eleven teams in as many states. The league's commissioner was Roger Wehrli. Because the league wanted to attract good local talent but did not pay any salary, it functioned as a temporary employment agency, and offered jobs and housing for players in local communities during the season. Despite that, it managed to attract decent talent, including ex-NFL players such as Rusty Hilger and Ben Rudolph, as well as coaches including Walt Michaels, Darryl Rogers and Lou Saban. After a successful first season, the league attracted strong sponsors in Wilson and Gatorade, but two teams folded midway through the second year, while the rest folded after the end of the season, unable to establish a working agreement with the NFL.

==== Modern circuit ====
Today, most leagues and independent teams are sanctioned by the American Football Association, which acts as an organizer of games and playoff tournaments for teams throughout the U.S. and maintains a Minor League/Semi-Pro Football Hall of Fame. Another semi-pro organization is the USA Bowl Championship Series, which ranks the top twenty-five semi-pro and amateur teams in the country, and crowns an annual "national champion" at the USA Bowl. The final such association is the United States Federation of American Football, which tries to divide the existing leagues into AAA and AA groups rated by business practices, representation, and athletics; it was formerly recognized by the International Federation of American Football as the USA's football governing body.

Under USA Football and Football Canada criteria, players at this level are eligible for the United States national American football team and Canada men's national football team, respectively.

The prominent present-day leagues in the adult amateur/semi-pro US circuit are:

League	First season	Type	Geographical area
Amateur to Professional Developmental Football League	2013	Outdoor	Southeast
American 7s Football League	2014	Seven-man Football	Traveling league
American Flag Football League	2018	Flag football	Traveling league
East Coast Football League	2013	Outdoor	New England
Eastern Football League	1961	Outdoor	Northeastern
Empire Football League	1969	Outdoor	New York State
Florida Football Alliance	2008	Outdoor	Florida
Mason-Dixon Football League	1978	Outdoor	Mid-Atlantic
MidStates Football League	1999	Outdoor	North Central
Minor Football League	1993	Outdoor	Eastern & Central United States
North Louisiana Football Alliance	2020	Nine-man football	South Central
New England Football League^{*}	1994	Outdoor	New England
Pacific Coast Football League	2006	Outdoor	California
Pacific Northwest Football League	2016	Outdoor	Pacific Northwest
Rocky Mountain Football League	1997	Outdoor	Rocky Mountains

^{*} The NEFL is unique in the American sports landscape, allowing promotion and relegation among conferences.

In Canada there are four prominent leagues:

League	First season	Type	Geographical area
Alberta Football League (AFL)	1984	Three downs	Alberta
Maritime Football League (MFL)	2001	Three downs	Maritime Provinces
Northern Football Conference (NFC)	1954	Four downs	Ontario
Ontario Power 5 Football League (OP5FL)	2024	Four downs	Ontario

The AFL and NFC are considered bigger leagues, and every September the NFC champion meets the champion of the AFL to determine the Canadian Major Football League national champions. In 2024 the two leagues reaffirm the agreement, after several teams split from the NFC and founded the Ontario Power 5 Football League.

Canada also has three prominent junior leagues: the Atlantic Football League, the Canadian Junior Football League, and the Quebec Junior Football League.

=== International American Football Leagues ===
American football continues to grow in popularity worldwide, and has had International Olympic Committee recognition since 2013. The NFL has tried to expand their exposure to additional markets by playing games outside the United States. The first pro game outside the U.S. and Canada was played in Japan in 1976. In 1978 the NFL played in Mexico, and in 1983 they had their first game in Europe, in London.

With the success of the international series in the 1970s and 1980s, other countries established their own leagues that have earned good reputations over the years, especially the long-established leagues throughout Europe and in Japan. European leagues and teams attract and sign American coaches and import players, some of whom have NFL experience, from U.S. colleges or other leagues. The number of import players allowed per team is set by league rules. The typical American import player contract includes a monthly salary, housing, insurance, transportation, round trip flights, meals, and possible performance bonuses. The top leagues in Europe are traditionally the German Football League (GFL), Austrian Football League, Italian Football League, and the Finnish league. The X-League in Japan, which plays under NCAA or NFL rules, is also very strong.

Usually the foreign players in the National Football League moved to the US early, and played the game in college, but there are exceptions. Anthony Dablé, a French football player, was the first foreign pro player to sign in the NFL. Moritz Böhringer was drafted in 2016 directly from the GFL, but did not play in an official game before returning to the GFL in 2021. Efe Obada was the first player to make an NFL 53-man active roster. Since 2017, the NFL has run the International Player Pathway Program (IPPP) to increase the number of non-American and non-Canadian players in the league.

Since 2017, the Canadian Football League (CFL) has tried to globalize as well, and made partnership agreements with football leagues in Austria, Denmark, Finland, France, Germany, Italy, Japan, Mexico, Norway, Sweden, and the United Kingdom. The league first held a special draft in 2019 for Mexican born players, and another one for European players., and hold a special global scouting combine and Global Draft for players from Europe, Mexico, and Japan since 2021. Today, each CFL team includes two designated global-player roster spots for players from outside the U.S. and Canada.

Another American league, the Gridiron Developmental Football League, has partnership agreements for player development with two international leagues: the Elite Football League of India and the Federación Deportiva Nacional de Fútbol Americano de Chile (FDNFA).

==== European League of Football ====
In March 2021, a new league, the European League of Football, announced it had reached an agreement with the NFL to be able to use team names from the days of NFL Europe. The league is a professional American football league, and consists of sixteen teams located in nine countries: Germany, Poland, Spain, Austria, Denmark, Switzerland, Hungary, Czech Republic and France. There are plans to expand to twenty-four teams in the future. KaVontae Turpin was the first ELF alum who played in the NFL, while Adedayo Odeleye and Marcel Dabo signed as practice squad players through the league's IPPP.

After the 2025 ELF season most teams left in order to establish two new separate leagues called European Football Alliance (EFA) and American Football League Europe (AFLE).

==== Australian Football League ====
American football uses significantly different rules than Australian rules football played in the Australian Football League (AFL). However, the punting specialist position requires similar skills under both rule sets. The most successful player to ever make the transition from the AFL to the NFL is Darren Bennett, who was selected to the NFL 1990s All-Decade Team. Because salaries are usually up to five times higher in the U.S., a high number of players try their luck in the American game. In the last decade, the NFL has placed full-time development officers in Australia, and there is a full-time punting academy in the Australian continent called ProKick Australia – which is aimed at training and assessing talented punters from the country for positions in major U.S. colleges and the NFL.

Although the vast majority of Australian players in the NFL are punters, there are a few exceptions. The most famous is offensive tackle Jordan Mailata, who played Rugby league and was drafted in 2018 without college experience. Another example is Joel Wilkinson, who signed with the Arizona Cardinals as a cornerback. Defensive end Adam Gotsis is probably the most successful non-punter Australian. He played at Georgia Tech in college and was drafted in the second round of the 2016 NFL draft by the Denver Broncos. Other notable players are Jarryd Hayne and Jesse Williams.

== Current and planned minor leagues ==
=== Current leagues ===
==== High-level ====
- (United States) United Football League (UFL), 2024–

==== Mid-level ====
- (United States) Continental Football League (CoFL), 2026-

==== Low-level ====
- (United States) Gridiron Developmental Football League (GDFL), 2010–
- (United States) Rivals Professional Football League (RPFL), 2014–
- (Mexico) Liga de Fútbol Americano Profesional (LFA), 2016–

=== Planned leagues ===
==== High-level ====
- (United States) ApexPro Football League (APFL), propose to begin in 2027.

==== Low-level ====
- (United States) Major League Football (MLF), propose to begin in 2022, but pushed back to 2024, again to September 2025 and later to 2026.

==== Developmental ====
- (United States) The Pro Showcase, began in 2025 as a scouting event, claims it will include games in the future.

== Defunct minor leagues ==
=== High-level ===
- (United States) Anthracite League, 1924 (Note: Pottsville Maroons moved to the NFL.)
- (United States) Ohio Valley League, 1925–1929 (Note: Informal association of teams; Portsmouth Spartans would later move to the NFL.)
- (United States) American Football League, 1934
- (United States) American Association* 1936–1941/American Football League* 1946–1950 (Note: American Association suspended operations for duration of U.S. involvement in World War II; in 1946 the AA was renamed American Football League.)
- (United States) Dixie League*, 1936–1942; (Note: Suspended operations in 1942 for duration of U.S. involvement in World War II; Some teams played few games at the newly formed (and somewhat informal) Virginia Football League in 1942 before going to full hiatus.) 1946–1947

Originally South Atlantic Football Association

- (United States) Midwest Football League, 1935–1939

Became American Professional Football Association in 1938, American Football League in 1939

- (United States) Pacific Coast Professional Football League*, 1940–1948
- (United States) American Football League, 1944 (Note: Merged with PCPFL in 1945.)
- (United States) (Canada) United Football League, 1961–1964
- (United States) Atlantic Coast Football League‡, 1962–1971, 1973
- (United States) (Canada) (Mexico) Continental Football League, 1965–1969

Supplemented the Professional Football League of America in 1968 and the Texas Football League in 1969.

- (United States) International Football League, 1983^{𝐟}
- (United States) (Canada) World League of American Football* 1991–1992 (Note: The league was in hiatus and re-branded as the NFL Europe League in 1995.)/NFL Europe* 1995–2007
- (United States) Professional Spring Football League, 1992^{𝐟}
- (United States) FanOwnership Football League, 1996^{𝐟} (Note: Merged with IFF in 1999, but both leagues folded without playing.)
- (United States) All-American Football League, 1997^{𝐟}
- (United States) International Football Federation, 1999^{𝐟}
- (United States) XFL, 2001
- (United States) All American Football League, 2007^{𝐟}
- (United States) United Football League, 2009–2012
- New United States Football League, (Note: Two separate attempts, with different managements.) 2010^{𝐟}, 2014^{𝐟}
- (United States) A-11 Football League, 2014^{𝐟}
- (United States) North American Football League, 2014^{𝐟}
- (United States) Spring League of American Football, 2018^{𝐟}
- (United States) Freedom Football League, 2019^{𝐟}
- (United States) Alliance of American Football, 2019
- (United States) XFL, 2020; 2023 (Note: Merged with the USFL to form the UFL in 2024)
- United States Football League, 2022–2023 (Note: Merged with the XFL to form the UFL in 2024)

=== Mid-level ===
- (United States) Regional Football League, 1999
- (United States) Spring Football League, 2000
- (United States) Fall Experimental Football League, 2014–2015 (Note: Reformatted as the developmental The Spring League.)
- (United States) Major League Football, (Note: Two separate attempts, with same management.) 2016^{𝐟}; 2022^{𝐟}
- (United States) American Patriot League, 2019^{𝐟}
- (United States) American Spring Football League, 2023^{𝐟}

=== Low-level ===
- (United States) Pacific Coast League, 1926
- (United States) Eastern League of Professional Football, 1926–1927
- (United States) Anthracite League, 1928–1929
- (United States) Eastern Football League, 1932–1933

Renamed Interstate Football League in 1933

- (United States) Greater New York League, 1934–1935 (Note: Informal association of teams.)

Originally the New Jersey Football Circuit (1934)

- (United States) American Legion League, 1934–1935
- (United States) Northwest Football League, 1935–1938

Outgrowth of the Tri-States Football League (1934)

- (United States) New England Football League, 1936
- (United States) Virginia-Carolina Football League, 1937
- (United States) California Football League, 1938
- (United States) Eastern Pennsylvania Football League‡, 1938
- (United States) Northeast Football League, 1940–1942 (Note: Informal association of teams.)
- (United States) Southern Professional Football League, (Note: Two separate attempts, with same management.) 1940^{𝐟}; 1944^{𝐟}
- (United States) Ohio Professional Football League, 1941
- (United States) Northwest War Industries Football League, 1942
- (United States) Eastern Football League, 1944
- (United States) Virginia Negro League, 1946
- (United States) Central States Football League, 1948–1953
- (United States) Pacific Football Conference, 1957–1958
- (United States) (Canada) American Football Conference, 1959–1961 (Note: Informal association of teams; the Toledo Tornadoes and Duquesne Ironmen would later move to the UFL and the ACFL (respectively).)
- (United States) Central States Football League, 1962–1975

Outgrowth of the Bi-States Football League (1949–1959) and Tri-States Football League (1960–1961)

- (United States) Midwest Football League‡, 1962–1978
- (United States) Southern Football League, 1963–1965

Merger between the Dixie Football League (1961–1962) and Florida Football League (1962–1963)

- (United States) (Canada) North Pacific Football League‡, 1963–1966
- (United States) New England Football League, 1964–1967

Renamed North Atlantic Football League in 1967

- (United States) North American Football League, 1965–1966

Supplemented the Southern Football League in 1966

- (United States) Professional Football League of America‡, 1965–1967
- (United States) Texas Football League 1966–1968 (Note: Merged with CoFL in 1969.)
- (United States) United American Football League, 1967
- (United States) Trans-American Football League, 1970–1971
- (United States) Midwest Professional Football League‡, 1970–1972 (Note: Started in 1969 as a Midwestern circuit with loose association between the teams.)
- (United States) Seaboard Football League, 1971–1974
- (United States) Southwestern Football League, 1972–1973
- (United States) California Football League, 1974–1982

Renamed Western Football League for the 1976 season

- (United States) American Football Association, 1977–1983
- (United States) Northern States Football League, 1977–1985
- (United States) United Football Teams of America, 1982
- (United States) United National Gridiron League, 2007^{𝐟}
- (United States) World Football League, 2008–2010
- (United States) Hawaii Professional Football League, 2011^{𝐟}
- (United States) Stars Football League, 2011–2013
- (United States) Trinity Professional Spring Football League, 2018^{𝐟}
- (Mexico) Fútbol Americano de México, 2019–2022
- (United States) (Mexico) International Football Alliance, 2025

=== Developmental ===
- (United States) Pacific Pro Football, 2017^{𝐟} (Note: Reformatted to a scouting event called HUB Football in 2020.)
- (United States) The Spring League, 2017–2021 (Note: Reformatted as the high-level United States Football League.)
- (United States) Your Call Football, 2018–2019
- (United States) Young Superstars League, 2019^{𝐟} (Note: Was supposed to function as the American Patriot League D-League)

^{*} Official NFL / AFL minor league.
^{‡} Unofficial NFL minor league, that featured NFL farm team(s).
^{𝐟} Folded without playing.

== See also ==
- United Football Players Association
