= Minor league =

Professional sports league below major league level

Minor leagues are professional sports leagues which are not regarded as the premier leagues in those sports. Minor league teams tend to play in smaller, less elaborate venues, often competing in smaller cities/markets. This term is used in North America with regard to several organizations competing in various sports. They generally have lesser fan bases, much smaller revenues and salaries, and are used to develop players for bigger leagues. Minor leagues are also occasionally used as a testing ground for proposed rule changes prior to implementation at the top level.

The minor league concept is a manifestation of the franchise system used in North American sports, whereby the group of major league teams in each sport is fixed for long periods between expansions or other adjustments, which only take place with the consent of the major league owners. In Europe, and many other parts of the world, association football (soccer), basketball, American football, baseball, handball, hockey, etc. leagues have many divisions below the top-flight level as part of the football pyramid. In other parts of the world there is usually either a system of annual promotion and relegation, meaning that clubs have no fixed status in the hierarchy, or there is only one professional league per country in each sport, rendering the major/minor distinction irrelevant.

== American football ==
While there are various semi-professional football leagues, none have any affiliation with the National Football League (NFL). The NFL and its teams have had working relationships with several independent leagues in the past, including the Association of Professional Football Leagues, the Atlantic Coast Football League, and most recently, the league owned-and-operated NFL Europe. In modern times, the NFL has developed players not ready for the active roster through each team's practice squad.

Several NFL owners had purchased teams in the Arena Football League in the mid-2000s, prior to its bankruptcy and restructuring. Arena football is played under very different conditions, and the AFL had its own minor league, af2, until 2009. Several other independent indoor football leagues that play a similar game exist.

Similarly, the Canadian Football League, though it has developed ties with the NFL in recent years and has moved away from competing with the NFL for talent, plays a visibly different game than the American game, and the two sports favor different types of skills; the CFL arguably holds major league status in its home territory of Canada.

Several minor or developmental leagues, independent of the NFL, have come and gone. Some, such as the Alliance of American Football and Fall Experimental Football League (along with the FXFL's successor, the still extant but non-paying The Spring League), have explicit minor league and developmental aspirations. Others, such as the United Football League and both the 2001 and 2020 incarnations of the XFL, have sought to maintain independence and maintain a national profile while acknowledging the lack of funds (particularly from television, which is by far the NFL's largest revenue stream) that would be needed to compete for NFL-caliber talent. The UFL during its existence was recognized and accepted as the second tier of professional football behind the NFL, with several former NFL stars playing in the UFL near the ends of their careers.

=== Current American football minor leagues ===
==== Pro football ====
High-level

- United Football League (UFL)

Low-level

- Gridiron Developmental Football League (GDFL)
- Liga de Fútbol Americano Profesional (LFA)
- Rivals Professional Football League (RPFL)

==== Semi-pro ====
- American 7s Football League
- Alberta Football League
- Empire Football League
- Florida Football Alliance
- Maritime Football League
- New England Football League
- Northern Football Conference
- North Louisiana Football Alliance

==== Indoor American football ====
High-level

- Indoor Football League
- National Arena League
- Arena Football One

Mid-level

- American Indoor Football
- The Arena League

Low-level

- American Arena League
- Great Lakes Arena Football

==== Flag football ====
- American Flag Football League

==== Women's ====
- Women's Football Alliance
- Legends Football League
- United States Women's Football League

== Association football (soccer) ==
=== Men ===
Below Major League Soccer several lower-level leagues operate on both sides of the U.S.–Canada border as part of the American and Canadian soccer pyramids. As is standard for sports in both countries, the formal promotion and relegation system is not used, although teams have been informally "promoted" from lower leagues up to Major League Soccer. The United Soccer League operates the USL League Two (formerly the Premier Development League, or PDL), a semi-professional league that has some age restrictions. The National Premier Soccer League operates at approximately the same level as USL League Two.

In 2013 Major League Soccer announced a partnership with the USL organization which began formal affiliation between some USL teams and MLS teams. The partnership continued to deepen through the 2010s; by the end of that decade, most MLS teams fielded their reserve teams in the USLC, while a few had their reserve sides in USL1 instead of the USLC. For several years, MLS nominally required all of its teams to either field a reserve team in the USL or officially affiliate with a separately owned USL team, but this was never strictly enforced. No formal relationship existed between NASL and the other leagues; NASL's commissioner had said he believed it would "stay that way for some time". However, MLS clubs started withdrawing their reserve sides from the USL system in 2020 amid rumors that MLS would relaunch its former MLS Reserve League in the coming years; these rumors were proved correct by the 2022 establishment of MLS Next Pro.

MLS Next (stylized in all caps) is a system of youth soccer leagues that are managed, organized and controlled by Major League Soccer. It was introduced by the league in 2020.

Semi-professional and amateur leagues sanctioned by the United States Adult Soccer Association are USL League Two, National Premier Soccer League, NISA Nation and United Premier Soccer League.

The system, introduced in mid-2020, was active for the first time during the 2020–21 season. It is a successor to the U.S. Soccer Development Academy. The system covers the under-13, under-14, under-15, under-16, under-17 and under-19 age groups.

=== Women ===
The developmental pathway for players outside the collegiate system has so far been mostly an ad hoc affair, with semi-professional and amateur leagues including the former USL W-League. The current United Women's Soccer, UWS League 2 and Women's Premier Soccer League not being sanctioned directly through the United States Soccer Federation, but through the affiliated United States Adult Soccer Association.

The USL organization has announced plans to create a full women's developmental pathway, establishing the semi-professional third-level USL W League (USLW; not to be confused with its former W-League) in 2022 and planning to launch the USL Super League (USLS) in 2023. The USL has applied for U.S. Soccer sanctioning of USLS; it has not yet announced its sanctioning plans for USLW.

== Indoor soccer ==
The Major Arena Soccer League 2 (M2) is a North American indoor soccer league that serves as the developmental league of the Major Arena Soccer League.

== Baseball ==
Minor league baseball is almost as old as the professional game itself, and at first consisted of attempts to play baseball in smaller cities and towns independent of the National League, the first true major league. Soon, scouts for the National League were traveling to watch minor league teams play and attempting to sign the more talented ones away. Soon Major League Baseball began formal developmental agreements with some minor league teams, while others remained independent.

Since it was first developed in the 1920s by St. Louis Cardinals executive Branch Rickey, the formal developmental affiliations have come to dominate minor league baseball, and the majority of minor leagues are part of the affiliated system. A general decline in minor league attendance occurred following the advent of television; minor league clubs only survived in many markets because their major league affiliations included financial support. The trend began to reverse in the 1990s, as new independent minor leagues began for the first time in decades and have become successful to varying levels.

In 2021, a major reorganization of the minor leagues saw the number of affiliated teams (i.e., those with formal links to MLB teams) reduced from 160 to 120, the Short-Season A level eliminated from the minor leagues, and all leagues above Rookie level in the affiliated system renamed. Also, four independent leagues were officially designated as "MLB Partner Leagues". In 2022, the leagues renamed in 2021 reverted to their traditional names.

- Minor League Baseball
  - International League (Class AAA)
  - Pacific Coast League (Class AAA)
  - Eastern League (Class AA)
  - Southern League (Class AA)
  - Texas League (Class AA)
  - Midwest League (Class A+)
  - Northwest League (Class A+)
  - South Atlantic League (Class A+)
  - California League (Class A)
  - Carolina League (Class A)
  - Florida State League (Class A)
  - Arizona Complex League (rookie)
  - Florida Complex League (rookie)
  - Dominican Summer League (rookie)
- Off-season leagues
  - Arizona Fall League
  - Colombian Professional Baseball League
  - Dominican Winter Baseball League
  - Mexican Pacific League
  - Puerto Rico Baseball League
  - Venezuelan Professional Baseball League
- Independent baseball league
  - MLB Partner Leagues:
    - American Association
    - Atlantic League
    - Frontier League
    - Pioneer League
  - Other leagues:
    - Empire League
    - Mexican League
    - Pacific Association
    - Pecos League
    - United Shore Professional Baseball League

== Basketball ==
The National Basketball Association has affiliated minor leagues: the NBA G League (formerly called the "NBA D-League") and NBA Summer League. The now-defunct Continental Basketball Association (CBA) served some of the purposes of a minor league for the NBA for many years. However, there were no direct developmental agreements between CBA and NBA teams the way that there are between Major League Baseball and National Hockey League teams and their minor league affiliates.

=== Current basketball minor leagues ===
==== Affiliated ====
- NBA G League
- NBA Summer League

==== Independent ====
Pro

US;

- The Basketball League (TBL)
- The Basketball Tournament (TBT)

Canada;

- Canadian Elite Basketball League (CEBL)
- National Basketball League of Canada (NBL Canada)
- Basketball Super League (BSL)

Semi-Pro

- American Basketball Association (ABA)
- Central Basketball Association (CBA)
- East Coast Basketball League (ECBL)
- Florida Basketball Association (FBA)
- Maximum Basketball League (MBL)
- North American Basketball League (NABL)
- Official Basketball Association (OBA)
- Premier Basketball League (PBL)
- United Basketball League (UBL)
- Universal Basketball Association (UBA)

== Ice hockey ==
The sport with the next most extensive system of minor league teams other than baseball is ice hockey. In North America, between 1988 and 2005, 233 minor league ice hockey teams played in a total of 160 cities in 13 minor professional leagues. The vast majority of these teams played in the United States, with only 21 of these teams based in Canadian cities. 123 of these minor professional teams played in the southern United States. One reason given for the large number of American-based teams is that minor league franchises will frequently move from city to city, and even between leagues. In contrast, Canadian cities more commonly host major junior teams, which develop teenage prospects prior to their move to the professional leagues.

All National Hockey League teams have a farm team in the American Hockey League and often have a secondary affiliated team in the ECHL. On "the farm", the NHL team will develop young players, occasionally rehabilitate older players who are injured or whose quality of play has slumped. These teams, in turn, have lower-level minor leagues to draw players from and pass players down to. Minor professional ice hockey leagues should not be confused with Junior (amateur players) or Senior (semi-professional to amateur) ice hockey leagues.

The American Hockey League is the most prominent of the minor hockey leagues in North America.

=== Current ice hockey minor leagues ===
==== Affiliated ====
- American Hockey League (AHL)
- East Coast Hockey League (ECHL)

==== Independent ====
- Federal Prospects Hockey League (FPHL)
- Ligue Nord-Américaine de Hockey (LNAH)
- SPHL (formerly known as the Southern Professional Hockey League)

==== Junior ====
- North American Hockey League (NAHL)
- United States Hockey League (USHL)
- Western Hockey League (WHL)
- Ontario Hockey League (OHL)
- Quebec Maritimes Junior Hockey League (QMJHL)

==== Senior ice hockey ====
- Mountain West Hockey League (MWHL)
- Allan Cup Hockey (Ontario Sr. AAA)
- Big 6 Hockey League (Saskatchewan Sr. AAA)
- Allan Cup Hockey West (Alberta Sr. AAA)
- North East Senior Hockey League (New Brunswick Sr. AAA)
- North Peace Hockey League (Alberta Sr. AAA)

==== Former minor leagues ====
- Atlantic Coast Hockey League (ACHL), now part of the Southern Professional Hockey League
- Central Hockey League (CHL), merged into the ECHL
- International Hockey League (IHL), merged into the American Hockey League
- International Hockey League (2007) (IHL), formerly the United Hockey League and Colonial Hockey League, merged into the Central Hockey League
- South East Hockey League (SEHL), now part of the Southern Professional Hockey League
- West Coast Hockey League (WCHL), merged into the ECHL
- Western Hockey League (1952–1974) (WHL), merged into the Central Hockey League
- Western Professional Hockey League (WPHL), merged into the Central Hockey League
- World Hockey Association 2 (WHA2), now part of the Southern Professional Hockey League

== Cricket ==
Minor League Cricket (MiLC) is a developmental league of Major League Cricket that began play in 2021.

== Other sports ==
Other sports organizations considered to be minor leagues are golf's Korn Ferry Tour and Epson Tour, respectively affiliated with the PGA Tour and LPGA; NASCAR's Xfinity Series, Craftsman Truck Series and Whelen All-American Series (and to a lesser extent ARCA and its ARCA Menards Series since ARCA's buyout by NASCAR in 2018); Monster Jam's Triple Threat Series; Overwatch Contenders; the FIA Formula 2 Championship and FIA Formula 3 Championship for Formula One; and various other affiliated satellite tours of other individual sports, including the Challengers Tour of Professional Tennis.

== See also ==
- List of developmental and minor sports leagues
- Youth system
- List of top level minor league sports teams in the United States by city
- Minor League Baseball
- Minor League Cricket
- Association of Professional Football Leagues
