= Major League =

Major League may refer to:

== Sport ==
- Major league, a baseball term
- Major League Baseball, the highest level of play in professional baseball in the U.S. and Canada.
- Major League Cricket, the franchise cricket league in the U.S. Formerly referred to a U.S. company that ran professional cricket competitions.
- Major League Eating, organizes top-level competitive eaters, eating events, television specials and merchandise, mostly in the U.S.
- Major League Football (disambiguation)
- Major League Gaming, a professional league dedicated to video game competition in the U.S.
- Major League Lacrosse, the highest level of play in professional field lacrosse in the U.S.
- Major League Quidditch, the highest level of play in quidditch in the U.S. and Canada
- Major League Rugby, the highest level of play in professional rugby union in the U.S. and Canada.
- Major League Soccer, the highest level of play in professional soccer in the U.S. and Canada.
- Major League Wrestling, a popular professional wrestling promotion that described itself as hybrid wrestling
- Major Hockey League (disambiguation)
- Major Soccer League, an indoor soccer league in the U.S. from 1978 to 1992
- Tonga Major League, the highest level of association football in Tonga
- Ukrainian Major League, former semi-professional ice hockey league in Ukraine, known only as the "Major League"

== Arts and entertainment ==
=== Films ===
- Major League (film), 1989
  - Major League II, 1994
  - Major League: Back to the Minors, 1998

=== Music ===
- Major League (band), a rock band from New Jersey, U.S.
- Major League, a musical project of Armin van Buuren with Tiësto
- Major Leagues (EP), by Pavement, 1999, and a song

== See also ==
- Minor league, in sports generally
