= Thomas Mayo (gridiron football) =

American gridiron football player (born 1990)

Shreveport
- Position: Wide receiver

Personal information
- Born: February 13, 1990 (age 36); Reston, Virginia, U.S.
- Listed height: 6 ft 2 in (1.88 m)
- Listed weight: 205 lb (93 kg)

Career information
- High school: South Lakes (Reston, Virginia)
- College: California (PA)
- NFL draft: 2012: undrafted

Career history
- Oakland Raiders (2012)*; Chicago Rush (2013)*; New York Jets (2013)*; Spokane Shock (2014)*; Tri-Cities Fever (2015); Nebraska Danger (2015–2016); Winnipeg Blue Bombers (2016); Saskatchewan Roughriders (2017); Montreal Alouettes (2018); Shreveport APL team (2023–present)
- * Offseason or practice squad member only

Career CFL statistics
- Receptions: 24
- Receiving yards: 227
- Receiving average: 11.5
- Receiving TDs: 1
- Stats at CFL.ca
- Stats at ArenaFan.com

Thomas Mayo (born February 13, 1990) is an American gridiron football wide receiver for the Shreveport team of the American Patriot League (APL). He was signed as an undrafted free agent by the Oakland Raiders in 2012. He played college football at California University of Pennsylvania.

== College career ==
In his junior season at Concord University, he was selected to the preseason Consensus Draft Services (CDS) First-team All-American team. In his senior season at California (PA), he was selected for the AP Second-team All-American following the conclusion of his senior season. On January 24, 2011, he was selected to the Don Hansen First-team All-American team while at Concord University. On January 19, 2012, he was named to the D2Football.com First-team All-American. He also was selected to the Daktronics First-team All-American, and Daktronics First-team All-Region. He was selected to the All-PSAC West First-team, preseason Sporting News All-American, preseason Lindy's First-team All-American, preseason D2Football.com Second-team All-American.

== Professional career ==
=== Oakland Raiders ===
On May 4, 2012, he signed with the Oakland Raiders as an undrafted free agent. On August 27, he was released.

=== Chicago Rush ===
On December 3, 2012, Mayo signed with the Chicago Rush of the Arena Football League.

=== New York Jets ===
Mayo signed with the New York Jets on March 1, 2013. He was waived on May 7. He was re-signed five days later. Mayo was released on July 23, and later reverted to the team's injured reserve list. He was waived from the injured reserved list with an injury settlement on July 25.

=== Spokane Shock ===
On September 11, 2013, he signed with the Spokane Shock of the Arena Football League.

=== Tri-Cities Fever ===
Mayo signed with the Tri-Cities Fever of the Indoor Football League (IFL). After two games of the regular season, Mayo was released to attend the 2015 NFL Veteran Combine.

=== Nebraska Danger ===
On June 4, 2015, Mayo signed with the Nebraska Danger. Mayo was released on May 4, 2016.

=== Winnipeg Blue Bombers ===
Mayo was with the Winnipeg Blue Bombers of the Canadian Football League during the 2016 training camp.

=== Saskatchewan Roughriders ===
In 2017, Mayo had a stint with the Saskatchewan Roughriders.

=== Montreal Alouettes ===
Mayo spent time with the Montreal Alouettes in 2018.

=== American Patriot League ===
In 2022, Mayo was selected by the Shreveport team of the American Patriot League (APL). They were scheduled to begin play in Spring 2023.

== Personal life ==
He is the son of Thomas Mayo, Jr. and Leslie Mayo.
