= Major professional sports league =

Major professional sports league may refer to:

- Major professional sports leagues in the United States and Canada
- Major League § Sport

== See also ==
- Sports league
- List of professional sports leagues
