= FanOwnership Football League =

Proposed late-1990s American football league

- Sport: American football
- Founded: 1996
- Folded: Never launched
- President: Shea Dixon
- No. of teams: 8 (planned)
- Country: United States
- Last champion: N/A
- Website: N/A

The FanOwnership Football League (FOFL) was a proposed professional American football league developed in the mid-1990s as part of a wave of attempts to create an alternative spring football product.

The league's was the brainchild of the United States Football League founder David Dixon and he pursued franchises in several major U.S. markets, with a fan ownership component, but the venture never progressed beyond its planning stages.

== League development ==
Plans for the FanOwnership Football League emerged publicly in 1996 when investors in Tampa Bay announced their intention to secure a franchise. Early outlines described a league designed to fill the NFL's offseason, playing a spring schedule and targeting cities that blended strong football cultures with available stadium dates. The plan was for the teams to be individually owned (with initial cost of $5 million to $6 million per franchise), however they'll be require to sell 70% of ownership to fans within three years. The FOFL planned was to play a 24-game schedule running from July 4 to the end of November, following with a two-week playoff series. The championship game was supposed to be held around Thanksgiving Day.

By late 1996, the FOFL had also set its sights on the West Coast. San Jose was among the markets approached, with reports noting that league executives were evaluating the region's facilities and potential ownership groups. The San Jose franchise was intended to be part of the league inaugural slate of eight teams.

== Markets and organization ==
Tentative league plans called for eight franchises located across major and mid-sized U.S. markets. Confirmed target cities included:

- Tampa Bay, Florida
- San Jose, California

Other prospective markets were not publicly finalized, though league spokespeople described national ambitions and ongoing discussions with multiple ownership groups in 11 other cities, including New York, Boston, Washington, D.C., Dallas, San Antonio, Houston, Orlando, Los Angeles and Detroit.

== Stadium plans ==
The Tampa Bay group explored playing in city-owned venues large enough to accommodate professional outdoor football. San Jose's prospective franchise considered multiple area stadiums, though none were formally announced as a committed home field before the project stalled.

== Demise ==
Despite initial investor interest and market evaluation, the league never reached the stage of formal team announcements, scheduling, or player signings. By early 1997, public communication ceased. The league would later try to merge with the International Football Federation but both leagues dissolved without launching a season.

== See also ==
- List of fan-owned sports teams
