= United States Football League (2010) =

American football minor league

New United States Football League
- Sport: American football
- Founded: 2008
- Folded: 2015
- No. of teams: 8–12 (planned)
- Country: USA
- Broadcasters: ABC, ESPN
- Related competitions: United Football League
- Website: ASFL.biz

The United States Football League was a proposed American professional football minor league founded in 2008 and aimed to begin play on February 20, 2010. The league was also known as the New United States Football League to distinguish it from the 1983–85 league of the same name. During its lifetime, the league had three different owner groups, with the last one aimed to start a season in 2015, but the plans never materialized; it was not until 2022 that a new version of the USFL would come to fruition; none of these versions of the USFL are directly related to each other.

The new USFL did not intend to become one of the "major league" sports organizations, but rather "committed to serving as a developmental league more akin to minor league baseball. As a developmental league, the USFL intended to offer players the opportunity to develop and refine their football skills and to showcase their abilities at a professional level." The league has publicly expressed an interest to also provide mentorship and training programs to help players prepare for their lives after football.

The initial ownership plan was that teams will be located in cities "large enough" to support a pro team, who are not served by NFL or MLB teams.

The league had a broadcasting agreement with the ESPN family of networks (including ABC).

== History ==
=== Premise ===
On August 23, 2008, a press conference revealed plans for the New USFL, founded by Southern California businessman Michael Dwyer, planning to start play in Spring of 2010. Tom Shapiro, former Assistant City Attorney of Santa Barbara, California was hired as Commissioner. The season was suppose run from February through June as a sixteen-game season with no pre-season games (similar to the old World Football League), while championship game was supposed to be played at the end of June, with an aim to avoid any overlap with the NFL schedule.

Dywer announced 12 target states for USFL teams in 2008. States specified were Nevada, California (2), Oregon (Portland), Texas, Louisiana, Florida, Arkansas, New York, Michigan, Ohio, and Alabama.

=== 2008–2011: First launch ===
After the initial press release the league kept a media silence, while most of the content was taken down from the official website during 2009 as the league stopped releasing new information. League founder Michael Dwyer advised in a YouTube interview that league investors have insisted on media silence as they work on building their league. On November 12, 2009, the website displayed a press release indicating that the league is "aiming to launch" in the spring of 2011, but no press release made and there were no reference to the previous plans. The website also indicated a goal of 10–12 teams for the opening season.

After three years of failed efforts to build a functional league, Dwyer sold the USFL brand to EndZone Sports Management, an entity headed by Jaime Cuadra headquartered in San Diego. The executive staff included Cuadra as President/CEO, Fred Biletnikoff, Jr. as Vice President of Football Operations and Bonnie-Jill Laflin as CMO/Executive Vice President. The advisory board included former players: Fred Biletnikoff, Sr., Lincoln Kennedy, Marshall Faulk, Jeff Garcia and Chris Doleman.

Unlike the previous regime, Cuadra was very open to discussing the league's progress. On July 20, 2011, on the radio show "Vegas Unwrapped", he said the league was close to getting their funding secured and hoped to start play in the spring of 2012, and named a series of team locations: Michigan, Columbus (OH), Norfolk (VA), Orlando (FL), Memphis (TN), Jackson (MS), Los Angeles (CA), Salt Lake City (UT), and either Little Rock (AR) or Shreveport (LA), San Antonio (TX) or another Texas city, and either Sacramento (CA) or Portland (OR). He also mentioned that there were a couple of groups that might be in play for a fourth northeastern slot.

In that interview, Cuadra also suggested the New USFL leadership would be open to inviting some UFL teams to join the New USFL, but such a merger did not occur as the New USFL did not launch in 2012.

By May 10, 2012, the Cuadra-led league was trumpeting Portland (OR), Salt Lake City (UT), San Antonio (TX) or Austin (TX), Columbus (OH) or Akron (OH), Oklahoma City (OK), Omaha (NE), Raleigh/Durham (NC), Birmingham (AL) and Memphis (TN) as team sites. Later the Cuadra-run USFL expected to play a 14-game regular season from March to June starting in the spring of 2013, but the league did not launch in the spring of 2013 either.

There were plans to launch in 2014, but those plans were delayed after President and CEO Cuadra was forced to resign from his league duties in February 2013 in the midst of a scandal. On June 24, 2013, Cuadra plead guilty to embezzling more than $1 million from two San Diego companies and using the money to fund the new USFL. Jim Bailey, the former longtime NFL executive, took over as the new CEO of the new USFL.

=== 2013–2015: Second launch attempt ===
The rights for the New USFL were acquired by a new entity, Touchdown Management, LLC (headed by Bailey) on August 1, 2013. Bailey posted an official statement on the league's blog stating a commitment to continue developing the new league and a desire to move on from the messy Cuadra era of the recent past.

The new league still had plans to field eight teams and play a 14-game regular season although the projected launch date has now been pushed back to 2015. The plan is for the season to start in mid-March and culminate with a championship game in mid-July to avoid competition with NFL and major college football training camps. Each USFL team was intended to have 44 players on its active lists, along with six practice squad players. Each team would also employ 10 coaches, including the head coach, an offensive and a defensive coordinator, four position coaches, one special teams coordinator and two quality control coaches, and each team would also been assigned eight football operations staff.

However, by the spring of 2014 the USFL management began stating on their social media sites that announcing the 2015 start date had been "overly optimistic" and a "mistake", while the league announced there will be no player combines or teams announced until they meet the requisite funding to operate the league for multiple seasons. As of January 2016, the league trademarks are "Dead/Cancelled".

== League finances ==
In the initial launch, the New USFL had plans that would allow fans to purchase stock in any franchise, similar to the Green Bay Packers structure. Per Shapiro, "... 30% of each team will be sold to the public in stocks, with an additional 20% of each team held by the league. We think this will help create fan loyalty and discourage teams from moving around." The league also suggested the "stock sales should help generate another $40 to $50 million in capital to help ensure the success of the New United States Football League."

== Rules ==
The new USFL has announced it would adopt a number of new rules (many of which were adopted from previous leagues):

- No pre-season, just a 16-game regular season (adopted from the World Football League, although the WFL played a 20-week regular season)
- No touchbacks on kickoffs; if the ball goes out of the endzone, it will be placed at the 15-yard line (adopted from Arena Football League)
- Field goals of 51 yards or more will be four points (adopted from NFL Europe)
- A three-point conversion will be placed at the 10 yard line (adopted from the XFL)
- One foot inbounds for a catch (contrary to the NFL)
- No kneel-downs (adopted from Arena Football League)
- Safeties are worth 4 points
- Overtime will use college rules.

== Teams ==
On September 14, 2008, Dwyer stated: "...We will be bringing back as many of the original team names as we can based upon the cities/stadiums we have lined up. A few of the team names will be new and we will introduce them all in the near future...". In later entries, he stated that eleven of the twelve original New USFL teams would reuse old USFL team names, while only one of the reused names will be in its original city. Dwyer also announced "that all team names will be released after March 09."

In 2013 the A-11 Football League (A11FL) ended up acquiring the intellectual property rights to most of the old USFL team names.

=== Initial proposed division structure (2008) ===
==== Western Division ====
- California 1 (San Jose)
- California 2 (Los Angeles)
- Nevada (Las Vegas)
- Oregon (Portland)
- Texas (San Antonio)
- Louisiana (Baton Rouge)

==== Eastern Division ====
- Florida (Orlando)
- Arkansas (Little Rock)
- Michigan (Detroit)
- Ohio (Cincinnati)
- Alabama (Birmingham)
- New York (West Point)

Other potential markets mentioned on the league site: Oklahoma City (OK), Jackson (MS), Washington (DC), Atlanta (GA), Buffalo (NY), Memphis (TN), Houston (TX), Dallas (TX), Philadelphia (PA), Salt Lake City (UT), Denver (CO), "Connecticut" and "Arizona".

=== Second launch proposed teams (2013) ===
- Akron, Ohio
- Austin, Texas
- Birmingham, Alabama
- Columbus, Ohio
- Dallas, Texas (added as potential location on 2014)
- Hartford, Connecticut
- Hershey, Pennsylvania
- Los Angeles, California
- Milwaukee, Wisconsin
- Memphis, Tennessee
- Oklahoma City, Oklahoma
- Omaha, Nebraska
- Portland, Oregon
- Raleigh/Durham, North Carolina
- Salt Lake City, Utah
- San Antonio, Texas

== American Spring Football League ==
In 2022, Dywer reemerged as the founder and CEO of the upstart American Spring Football League (ASFL), after he claimed he lost the USFL trademarks as a result of a lawyer misconduct. The ASFL an aim to start a season in 2023, in "eight or nine cities". According to Dywer, the league will play in "medium markets", which has "large stadium venues available", although the teams would start play in smaller stadiums and move to the bigger ones when "they'll established strong enough fan base". He also mentioned there will be no preseason games. The championship game will be called "The Dixon Cup" to honor the late businessman David Dixon, who championed spring football. On April 13, 2023 the league announced that the targeted launch date is 2024, which was later pushed again to 2025. As of 2025, there have been no further developments, the league website was shut down and the project is believed to have been abandoned.

Dywer announced the league would adopt a number of new rules, including: A four-point field goal from 55-yards or greater, a 30-second play clock and an option to earn 1 point for the kicking team if the kickoff goes through the uprights (while the return team will receives the ball at the 15-yard line).

=== Teams and players ===
Dywer mentioned some cities who might fit the category: Austin, San Antonio, Ft. Worth, Waco and El Paso in Texas, Orlando, Florida, Columbus, Ohio, Jackson, Mississippi and Birmingham, Alabama, while he also added some other states like Arkansas, Oklahoma, Tennessee and Virginia. He also mentioned, the ASFL will start as a "regionally-based instead of nationally-based because of the transportation costs". In initial years the league will feature four teams throughout the State of Texas, and four more in neighboring states.

In March 2022, the league Facebook page announced that "Mississippi is officially the first ASFL team taken", but on October they announced Houston would be the first city and will be owned by Daryl Hobbs, who opened a GoFundMe campaign – with a $2,800,000 goal – to fund the team. Two days later they announced that Little Rock, Arkansas would be the league second franchise and would be owned by Ron Calcagni. In the end of 2023, the league awarded a Texas franchise to Mac Davis, the co-owner of the Wheeling Miners, but no city was specified.

Each team will have a 43 to 46-man roster with a "strict salary cap for players and coaches", while players will be drafted in "territorial draft". Contracts will be for one year in the first season, and then for three years if they'll return, while salaries will be "comparable to the defunct Arena Football League".

=== League finances ===
The ASFL aim to start with a crowdfunding from potential markets for league office, while the teams will be privately owned, and would have to fund the team for a full year in advance, while the money will be placed in a escrow account and the league will oversee worker's comp. Average ticket prices would be $25 to $30.
