= Major League Football =

Major League Football may refer to:

- Major League Football (MLF), a planned professional fall American football minor league; founded in 2019 by Adam McClean
- Major League Football (MLFB), a professional American football league, with two cancelled seasons; founded in 2014 by Frank Murtha
