= North American Football League =

Proposed American spring football league, NAFL, defrauded investors

- Sport: American football
- Founded: 2014
- CEO: Christopher White
- Country: United States
- Website: theNAFL.com

The North American Football League (NAFL) was a proposed American spring football minor league. In 2014, the league announced it was to begin play for the 2016 season; however, there have been no further announcements that the league has met any of their listed key dates as of April 1, 2016.

The league were scheduled to run tryouts on March 15, 2015, in Monroeville, Pennsylvania, and charged prospective recruits over $100. However, it was reported that nobody from the league actually attended the tryouts. The league stated that the tryouts had been postponed to March 29 but the local representatives had failed to notify attendees. A later tryout in the Atlanta area would be cancelled the morning of the scheduled date.

In May 2017, league chairman Christopher White, and his wife, Tracy, were charged with grand theft in defrauding a potential investor of $150,000. They are alleged to have taken up for $700,000 with no intent on actually launching a functioning league and an affiliated production company for broadcasting games.

== Proposed teams ==
Team	Location	Announced
Birmingham Freedom	Birmingham, Alabama	2015
Connecticut Colonials	Hartford, Connecticut	2015
Columbus Flight	Columbus, Ohio	2015
Kentucky Thoroughbreds	Louisville, Kentucky	2015
Memphis Kings	Memphis, Tennessee	2015
North Carolina Redwolves	Raleigh, North Carolina	2015
OKC Slingers	Oklahoma City, Oklahoma	2017
Orlando Sentinels	Orlando, Florida	2015
St. Louis Scouts	St. Louis, Missouri	2017
Virginia Crusaders	Richmond, Virginia	2015
