= Northwest Football League =

Football League

- Sport: American football
- First season: 1935
- Folded: 1938
- Claim to fame: The first football league to feature an all-Black football team
- No. of teams: varied (from 4 to 8)
- Country: United States
- Last champion: Des Moines Comets
- Most titles: La Crosse Lagers and Des Moines Comets (2)

The Northwest Football League (NWFL) was a professional American football minor league that played from 1935 to 1938, in the northern part of Midwestern United States. The league had some relationships with the National Football League (NFL), and scheduled exhibition games against the Chicago Bears, Chicago Cardinals and Green Bay Packers through it existence.

The last remaining member of the NWFL, the Des Moines Comets, continued as independents through 1940.

== League origin ==
Prior to the NWFL first season there was a circuit that operated in the Midwestern area called Tri-States Football League in 1934. The "league" was more of a loose association between the teams, who also scheduled games against NFL and other prominent independent or Canadian pro teams, without attempt to crown a champion as scheduling was left up to each team. Because of that there were wide variations, both in the overall number of games played and in the number played against other association members.

The Chippewa Falls Marines, Gogebic Panthers, La Crosse Old Style Lagers and Minnesota All-Stars (then known as the Minnesota University All-Stars) would later form the Tri-States Division in the Northwest Football League.

== 1935 ==
The season started with eight teams, four teams from the Tri-States Football League, and four from the Minneapolis–Saint Paul area, divided to two separate divisions. The St. Paul Bears folded after only two games (both loses), while the Minneapolis Ewalds decided to dropped out before the final week of the season.

Tri-States Division
Team	W	L	T	PCT
La Crosse Old Style Lagers	5	0	0	1.000
Gogebic Panthers*	6	1	0	.857
Chippewa Falls Marines	3	3	2	.500
Minnesota All-Stars	3	4	1	.437
Twin Cities Division
Team	W	L	T	PCT
Minneapolis Jerseys	3	3	2	.500
Minneapolis Ewalds†	1	4	1	.250
Minneapolis Flour City	1	5	2	.250
St. Paul Bears†	0	2	0	.000

Northwest Football League champions.
^{†} Folded mid-season.

Championship Game: Minneapolis Jerseys 0 vs. La Crosse Old Style Lagers 25 (November 24, 1942 in Minneapolis, MN)

Lagers star Halfback Russ Cycmanick was killed in a car accident on his way to the game, while starting Guard Herman ("Max") Gay was seriously injured and had to retire from football. A week after the season La Crosse played All-Star benefit exhibition game against "Northwest Football League All-Stars", winning the match 18–13, and donating the earnings to the players families.

== 1936 ==
After the dissolution of the Tri-States Division, the league dropped the two-division format, and decided the championship solely on the regular season results. On October 11, La Crosse decided to run the score against Madison (winning 100–0), because they wanted the Cardinals to drop out of the league, as they failed to attract former Wisconsin Badgers stars as promised. The Cardinals folded few days later.

Team	W	L	T	PCT
La Crosse Lagers	7	1	1	.833
Des Moines Comets	6	2	1	.722
Gogebic Panthers	2	1	1	.625
Duluth Eskimos	1	1	1	.500
Rock Island Independents	2	4	0	.333
Minneapolis Millers	2	6	0	.250
St. Paul Saints	1	4	0	.200
Madison Cardinals	0	2	0	.000

Northwest Football League champions.

== 1937 ==
The league returned for the 1937 with only four teams. Des Moines were able to defeat La Crosse in both meetings, finishing the season with a perfect 6–0 record and winning their first championship.

Team	W	L	T	PCT
Des Moines Comets	6	0	0	1.000
La Crosse Lagers	3	2	0	.600
Cedar Rapids Crushers	1	4	0	.200
St. Paul Bears	0	4	0	.000

Northwest Football League champions.

== 1938 ==
The two-time champions La Crosse failed to field a team for the 1938 season, with only Des Moines and Cedar Rapids returning from previous season. To compensate, the league added lower level independent teams, but none offer a real competition to the Comets, who ran out the league for their second and final NWFL championship. The league disbanded at the end of the season, with most teams folded.

The only other important team that season was the Chicago Brown Bombers, an all-black team that played almost exclusively on the road. The Brown Bombers played a year earlier against league members as a non-league opponents, but made history in 1938 when they joined the NWFL full-time, as the first all-black football team in a pro football league.

Team	W	L	T	PCT
Des Moines Comets	8	0	0	1.000
Cedar Rapids Crushers	2	1	0	.667
St. Paul Saints	0	1	0	.000
Chicago Brown Bombers	0	2	0	.000
Peoria Wildcats	0	3	0	.000
Macomb Eagles	0	3	0	.000

Northwest Football League champions.
