= American Patriot League =

Planned professional American football league

- Sport: American football
- Founded: 2018
- First season: 2027 (planned)
- No. of teams: 8 (planned)
- Country: United States
- Website: aplfootball.us

The American Patriot League (APL) is a planned professional American football minor league, which is owned by The World Professional Football Association, a single entity corporation, that will manage the business of the APL. It was initially planned to launch in 2019.

The season is supposed to run from April through June as a 14-game season, featuring eight team divided into two divisions: Freedom and Liberty.

== History ==
=== Premise ===
The APL will be a single entity corporation, that will consist eight franchises that will be divided into two divisions: Freedom Division and Liberty Division. Each team will play a 14 game schedule consisting of 7 home games and 7 away games. The WPFA had plans to add additional team cities to the APL in 2020 and 2021. To incentivize players from leaving the league for other leagues, the APL plans to offer lifetime health coverage for anyone who stays at least five seasons, along with a minimum salary of $50,000 a season to all players.

The APL management team consists of former football players Keon Lattimore, Marques Ogden, Bob Golic, and Director of Football Operations David Holloway. Golic stated that none of the players who make an APL roster will be allowed to kneel during the national anthem. All team nicknames will be chosen by the fans as part of a naming contest.

Part of the league’s strategy for financial survival includes establishing itself in markets where there is a passion for football and where there are not many (if any) other pro sports franchises in place. Those are the main reasons, according to Ogden, why the league preferred Daytona Beach to Orlando.

=== 2019 canceled season ===
The 2019 inaugural season was supposed to last from April 6 through June 8, with the playoffs from June 15 through June 23. The original plan for the Championship Game was to have it played on Navy–Marine Corps Memorial Stadium at the campus of the United States Naval Academy in Maryland during the 4th of July weekend. Instead, the Championship Game was moved to Tom Benson Hall of Fame Stadium at Canton, Ohio and was to be played on July 6. Broadcasts would've been available with a paid subscription to the Awesome Cloud Network.

Daytona Beach, Florida and Mobile, Alabama were the first locations to be announced by the league, while Sacramento California, Shreveport, Louisiana, Houston, Texas, Canton, Ohio and Ypsilanti, Michigan announced on later date, with an eighth team ("Mystery City") was to be announced as of June 5, 2020. The APL cancelled their planned Little Rock, Arkansas showcase on October 27-28, 2018 but did conduct the two other showcases in Houston on November (10-11) and December (1-2) and added Daytona Beach (January 5-6, 2019), Houston (January 12-13, 2019) and Cocoa Beach, Florida (February 1-10, 2019) showcases, that never materialized. On January the league started allocating players to the teams, while training camps would be held at Cocoa Beach between January 31 to March 2, 2019.

In February 2019, the APL made an announcement that they were postponing the start of their inaugural 2019 season until 2020, and later postponed it again to 2022, then 2023 due to the COVID-19 pandemic.

Since the December 2021 announcement the league hasn’t posted anything on its website in regards to the league rebooting anytime soon.

=== 2027 proposed season ===
In September 2026, the league website was updated for the first time in five years, with the following announcement: "We are looking forward to our upcoming first season with a 2027 Kickoff! Plans are in motion to get the APL ready for the spring season in 2027, please check back for updates concerning tryouts, schedules and more in the coming months".

== Teams ==
Club	City	Stadium	Capacity	Head coach
Canton	Canton, Ohio	Tom Benson Hall of Fame Stadium	23,000	Jamie Thomas
Daytona Beach	Daytona Beach, Florida	Daytona Stadium	9,601	Linwood Wright
Houston	Houston, Texas	Rice Stadium	47,000	Joe Nixon
Mobile	Mobile, Alabama	Ladd–Peebles Stadium	33,471	Tim Beckman
Mystery City	TBA	TBA	TBA	TBA
Sacramento	Sacramento, California	Hughes Stadium	20,311	Duncan Anderson
Shreveport	Shreveport, Louisiana	Independence Stadium	49,565	Erin Henderson
Ypsilanti	Ypsilanti, Michigan	Rynearson Stadium	30,200	TBA

Locations of teams for the 2019 APL season

== Young Superstars League ==
The league plans to operate their own minor developmental league called Young Superstars League (YSL). the league will allow players between the age 18-25 years old to play in an organized league of their own and developing the skills necessary to compete in the APL.

YSL will be designed for players that cannot afford to pay for college or may not want to spend time there. The league will allocate funds for players that would like to pursue a college education or business trade after or during their playing days, and will have tutors and online college courses for players so they can continue their education and studies all year.
