= North Louisiana Football Alliance =

Minor developmental football league in Bossier City, Louisiana

- Current season, competition or edition: 2026 NLFA season
- Classification: Developmental
- Sport: American football
- Founded: 2019
- First season: 2020
- President: Holland Witherspoon
- Motto: "The Next Level Experience"
- No. of teams: 8 (6 active)
- Countries: United States
- Most recent champion: Bombers (2 titles)
- Website: nlfafootball.com

The North Louisiana Football Alliance (NLFA) is a nine-man football american football developmental league based in Bossier City, Louisiana. The league established itself as a single entity, owning all eight of its teams, and playing during spring from March to May. The league began to play in July 2020 in wake of the COVID-19 pandemic, competing in an abbreviated season.

The league aims is to become the first professional Nine-man football league, serving as a college alternative and to develop players to professional indoor and arena teams.

== Background ==
Each year countless high school athletes miss out on an opportunity to play football at the collegiate level due to a variety of circumstances. Air Force veteran Holland Witherspoon took notice, developing an interest in this occurrence, and decided to create somewhat of a platform to serve as a college alternative for these athletes to further player development as well as assist them in advancing to a more established professional league.

== History ==
The NLFA was established in 2019, introducing nine-man to the southern region. It was created as an alternative for young athletes between the ages of 18 and 24 a chance to participate in a highly competitive level of post-high school football, with an opportunity to advance to a professional level.

All teams will play their games at one scheduled location within the Ark-La-Tex region during the regular season. The league is the first to attempt to brand nine-man adult tackle football as a professional minor league.

=== 2020 season ===
In July 2020, originally slated for a March 21 start date, the league was forced to push its inaugural season back due to the COVID-19 pandemic. However, the league found itself playing an abbreviated schedule as social distancing mandates began to loosen, thus serving as a demo season.

=== 2021 season ===
For the 2021 season, the league was finally in a position to compete in its first full season, competing in an eight-week regular season from two hub cities: the West Division in Bossier City, Louisiana, and the East Division in Minden, Louisiana. The league saw its first championship game, hosting the LA Tigers and the Bossier City Bombers, where the Tigers emerged as the league champions. On July 28, 2021, the Tigers announced their departure from the NLFA to return to eight-man contention.

On October 8, 2021, the North Louisiana Football Alliance announced that the league had signed a multi-year agreement with Stinger Sports to become the official on-field apparel and uniform provider for all of its teams.

On November 14, 2021, the NLFA hosted an international combine for the Fútbol Americano de México (FAM), a professional American football league based in Mexico. The tryouts were held at Independence Stadium (Shreveport) in Shreveport, Louisiana, and were arranged in conjunction with former Alabama running back Trent Richardson’s brand TR3 Combines.

=== 2022 season-present ===
On March 19, 2022, the league started the season with only 4 of its 8 teams, and are scheduled to play a 10-week schedule, playoffs included, and will include one bye-week.

On January 26, 2023, the league announced that Longview, Texas would become the third hub city location for the 2023 season and beyond.

On May 8, 2025, the league announced that it was ending its traditional championship model to focus on player development starting in 2026, fully transitioning into a showcase-style league.

== Season Structure ==
From March to May, the NLFA holds a regular season of 6 to 8 showcase games, spanning 8 to 10 weeks. All games are primarily played in a single-hub location scheduled for Saturdays or Sundays. The season concludes with the NLFA Elite Game featuring the league's best players.

NLFA teams typically play one or two controlled scrimmages in late February, after their winter training camps, to help new officials and players get accustomed to nine-man football.

== NLFA Rules ==
The NLFA has rules that are different and specific to the league, with the most noted being no PAT conversions and its adopted version of the XFL kickoff. In addition to nine-man tackle, rule differences are:

- The spot of the kickoff is set at the kicking team's 30-yard line. However, members of the kicking team (excluding the kicker) line up at the receiving team's 35-yard line and blockers on the receiving team must line up at their 30-yard line. Only the kicker and returner(s) can move until the ball is either caught or three seconds after it hits the ground.
- Kickoffs that go out of bounds, or fall short of the receiving team's 20-yard line, come to the kicking team's 30-yard line. (Slightly different from the XFL due to the size of the playing field.)
- 30-second play clock
- Running clock until the last two minutes of each half
- Only 5-man rush allowed
- Receivers only need one foot in bounds to complete a catch
- All punts are declared a free-kick, and the punter must be at least 5 yards behind the line of scrimmage. NO fake punts. The NLFA does not allow gunners to move prior to the kick; all players on a punting team must remain on or behind the line of scrimmage until the ball is kicked. Any punt that has traveled at least 25 yards past the line of scrimmage can be recovered by the kicking team. (Similar to the punting rules used in the 2001 XFL)
- After a safety, the team that was scored upon must kick the ball from its own 20-yard line.
- In overtime, after a touchdown has been made, the scoring team has the option to go for a 2 point conversion from the 3 yard line (run or pass play) or a 3 point conversion from the 5 yard line (run or pass play).
- After the first offensive team has either scored or turned the ball over, the opposing team has the same scoring opportunity from the same 20-yard line in the same direction.
- If the score is still tied after each team has had an offensive possession, then the game will be declared a tie.

== Media ==
The NLFA uses internet streaming as its main television platform and is streamed on the leagues' YouTube channel after each broadcast.

On March 6, 2025, Antler Sports Network and the North Louisiana Football Alliance announced via Facebook that ASNTV will broadcast "NLFA Today," a weekly show featuring recaps, stats, and exclusive interviews.

== Players and Compensation ==
The league would focus its recruitment efforts on high school graduates not going to college or having been removed from school within three years to play in the NLFA. The NLFA does not have a base salary for its players but has established a bonus and incentive system instead. In addition, NLFA players will be allowed to enter into sponsorship agreements with local businesses.

== Teams ==
Team	Hub location	First year	Head coach
Bombers	Bossier City, Louisiana	2020	
Lumberjacks	Bossier City, Louisiana	2022	
Roughnecks	Bossier City, Louisiana	2020	
Eagles	Longview, Texas	2021	
Rattlers	Longview, Texas	2022	
Wranglers	Longview, Texas	2023	

=== Inactive Teams/Never Played ===
- Eagles - The Eagles saw a brief piece of the action during the 2021 season and sat out the 2022 season due to a lack of personnel. The Eagles are set to return for the 2026 season.
- Rattlers - The Rattlers were temporarily deactivated for the 2023 season, and are now set to return in 2026.
- Cyclones - Played the inaugural 2020 season and the 2021 season, then the league decided to make them inactive 2022 season. The NLFA hinted at a Cyclones return for the 2023 season but decided to keep the club inactive.
- Lions - The Lions were scheduled to play the inaugural season, but never played.

== NLFA Champions ==
Year	Winner	Runner up	Score
2021	LA Tigers	Bombers	8-0
2022	Lumberjacks	Bombers	40-0
2023	Bombers	Lumberjacks	22-20
2024	Bombers	Roughnecks	30-16

^{*} Before the 2021 season, no official champion was named by the league.

* The Bombers wrap up the season undefeated, cementing their status as the top team in the league.

== NLFA Commissioners ==
- Robbie Swan (2023-2025)
- Jeremy Gallman (2019–2022)
