= Spring League of American Football =

- Sport: American football
- Founded: 2016
- No. of teams: 8 (planned)
- Country: United States
- Broadcaster: TBD
- Website: www.slafootball.com

The Spring League of American Football (SLAF) was a planned professional American football league. The league was first announced in September 2016 with an expected 10 teams with the first season starting in 2018, but as the starting date approached the league was still looking for an investment of $100 million, thus pushing its first season with eight teams back to 2019 or 2020.

The SLAF executive team consisted of former Madison Square Garden (MSG) executive Michael Lardner and MSG Chief Financial Officer Robert Pollichino. According to the league management, they would like to create a relationship with the NFL as some sort of a developmental minor league.

In October 2018, the league’s trademarks were declared abandoned by the USPTO.

== Premise ==
The league would split the country into 10 zones for the franchise based in the zone which would draw player from the colleges and high schools in the zone to have ready rivalries (players must have their college eligibility expired to try out). Team owners would be able to place their team anywhere in the zone, and the season would run from April to July for 10 games plus playoffs:

The SLAF is a competitive professional football league with a spring schedule and storied rivalries already established. With unique geographical boundaries for each team, players can only play within their college’s region. Ten teams and a ten game schedule, not including playoffs, sum up the foundation of this long overdue concept.

— Official website

== Rules ==
The SLAF will play by rules of the National Football League, including having 11 players on the field and needing two feet inbounds on receptions. The lone exception would be overtime rule for which they will use college overtime rule instead of the NFL's.

== Zones ==
| Zone | States |
|---|---|
| Ohio Valley | Ohio, Kentucky, West Virginia, Indiana |
| Atlantic | Maryland, District of Columbia, Virginia, North Carolina, South Carolina |
| East | New York, Pennsylvania, Massachusetts, New Jersey, Rhode Island, Connecticut, New Hampshire, Vermont, Maine, Delaware |
| South | Tennessee, Mississippi, Alabama, Louisiana |
| South-East | Florida, Georgia |
| Plains | North Dakota, South Dakota, Nebraska, Kansas, Oklahoma, Colorado |
| Midwest | Michigan, Wisconsin, Illinois, Minnesota, Iowa, Missouri |
| South-West | Arkansas, Texas |
| North-West | Washington, Oregon, Idaho, Montana, Wyoming, Utah, Alaska, Hawaii |
| West | California, Nevada, New Mexico |
