= Virginia-Carolina Football League =

- Sport: Football
- Founded: 1937
- Folded: 1937
- No. of teams: 5
- Country: United States
- Last champion: Richmond Rebels
- Related competitions: Dixie League

The Virginia-Carolina Football League was a short lived professional American football minor league formed in 1937 by clubs from Virginia and one team from North Carolina. The VCFL was a regional minor league, that was formed behind the backbone of the Richmond Rebels, an association of players that walked off the Dixie League Richmond Arrows after their salary demand were not answered. The league featured five teams, with one additional team from Roanoke, Virginia, the Roanoke Rassler-Dazzlers, as an independent member.

VCFL attendance was generally in the range of 1,000 to 2,000 fans per game (about half of what the Dixie League) and media attention was insignificant, resulting in league disbandment after only one season.

== History ==
On November 15, 1936, Dixie League's Richmond Arrows team coach (Dave Miller) and the players walked off the team in an effort for more pay. When Arrows manager hired a new head coach and players (to join the five who didn't strike) to finish the season, the striking player decided to form their own team, called Richmond Rebels.

At first they tried to form an all Virginia league, which would contain teams in Norfolk (Tars), South Norfolk (Acs), Portsmouth (Sewanee), Lynchburg and Roanoke, but when the last two dropped before season start, a team from Durham, North Carolina (Bobcats) was invited. Roanoke, would later elected to participate as an "unofficial entry" and played all "exhibition" scheduled, were named "Rassler-Dazzlers" because they employed several professional wrestlers, while all teams rosters were stocked from local colleges. The Bobcats featured the most recognizable name, Back Clarence Stasavich, who would later coach Lenoir–Rhyne to an NAIA championship in 1960.

== The 1937 season ==
Because the Richmond team had more experience from the other league members, it was apparent from the get go that they simply outclassed the competition, and they finished the season with six wins in six games (and one "exhibition" 0-0 drew with Portsmouth). Their biggest test was in week five, when they met the previously undefeated Durham Bobcats, and beat them 7-0 at Tate Field before a crowd estimated at 2,000.

The league did not attempt to compile statistics or pick an all-star team, although Rebels player-coach (FB) Marcel (Mush) DeLotto considered to be the best player in the VCFL.

=== Results ===
Pre-Season
Richmond Rebels 7 vs. South Norfolk Aces 0
Week 1
Richmond Rebels 28 vs. Portsmouth Sewanee 0
Week 2
Richmond Rebels 27 vs. Norfolk Tars 0
South Norfolk Aces 6 vs. Durham Bobcats 13
Roanoke Rassler-Dazzlers 29 vs. Portsmouth Sewanee 6 (exhibition)
Week 3
Richmond Rebels 33 vs. South Norfolk Aces 0
Durham Bobcats 14 vs. Portsmouth Sewanee 0
Roanoke Rassler-Dazzlers 6 vs. Norfolk Tars 3 (exhibition)
Week 4
Norfolk Tars 0 vs. Durham Bobcats 0
Portsmouth Sewanee vs. South Norfolk Aces (forfeit)
Week 5
Norfolk Tars 0 vs. Portsmouth Sewanee 0
South Norfolk Aces 6 vs. Roanoke Rassler-Dazzlers 0 (exhibition)
Richmond Rebels 7 vs. Durham Bobcats 0
Week 6
Richmond Rebels 28 vs. Portsmouth Sewanee 7
South Norfolk Aces 8 vs. Norfolk Tars 7
Durham Bobcats 21 vs. Roanoke Rassler-Dazzlers 0 (exhibition)
Week 7
South Norfolk Aces 13 vs. Norfolk Tars 6
Richmond Rebels 0 vs. Portsmouth Sewanee 0 (exhibition)
Week 8
Richmond Rebels 21 vs. South Norfolk Aces 0
Durham Bobcats 20 vs. Portsmouth Sewanee 0
Norfolk Tars 0 vs. Roanoke Rassler-Dazzlers 0 (exhibition)
Week 9
Roanoke Rassler-Dazzlers 19 vs. Norfolk Tars 12 (exhibition)
Portsmouth Sewanee 13 vs. South Norfolk Aces 6

=== Standings ===
This table shows both league and non-league unofficial standings.

The Richmond Rebels were considered "Champions" after finishing the season undefeated.

Team	W	L	T	Pct.	PF	PA	Notes
Richmond Rebels	6	0	0	1.000	144	7	
Durham Bobcats	3	1	1	.750	47	13	
Portsmouth Sewanee A.C	2	4	1	.333	20	96	
South Norfolk Acs	2	5	0	.285	33	93	
Norfolk Tars	0	4	2	.000	13	69	
Roanoke Rassler-Dazzlers	3	2	1	-	54	48	exhibition games only

== See also ==
- Dixie League
