= Freedom Football League =

Planned professional American football league

- Sport: American football
- Founded: 2018
- No. of teams: 10 (planned)
- Country: United States
- Website: freedomfootball.co

The Freedom Football League (FFL) was a planned professional spring-summer American football minor league. The league was set to begin play in 2019 after the announcement of several teams, but as of 2024, there have been no further developments and the project is believed to have been abandoned.

== History ==
The Freedom Football League was announced on December 6, 2018 by Ricky Williams on ESPN's Outside the Lines. Williams indicated there were 100 initial stakeholders plus additional financing planned. He also announced the teams' locations and names.

In 2019, the league was planning to make a series of private and public equity offerings. While ESPN reports that no set first season date, Sporting News indicated 2020 for the first season, but there have been no formal announcements from the league since. As of 2024, the league's website is shut down.

== Premise and rules ==
At the time of the league's announcement, indications had been that it would not necessarily follow 11-on-11 standard outdoor rules and would more closely resemble a seven-on-seven format similar to the A7FL, a national semi-professional league.

The FFL was overtly ideological. Its ownership structure is built around the premise that the current professional football landscape is dominated by billionaires; hence, its name is derived from the freedom it intended to give its players from the closely held structure of other professional leagues by offering equity stakes to players. The FFL claims it would not discourage its players from politics, such as kneeling during the national anthem.

All teams except for last-placed team in the conference would qualify for the playoffs. The first round would've been the Conference Semifinals, consisting of the top-seed hosting the fourth seed, and the second hosting the third. The winners would've advanced to the Conference Finals, and the conference winners would've played for the League Championship.

== Teams ==
The FFL had proposed eight teams to be split into two conferences.

Locations of teams — Eastern Conference Western Conference

Team	City
Western Conference
Texas Revolution	TBD
Oakland Panthers	Oakland, California
Portland Power	Portland, Oregon
San Diego Warriors	San Diego, California
Eastern Conference
Alabama Airmen	TBD
Florida Strong	TBD
Ohio Players	Cleveland, Ohio
St. Louis Independence	St. Louis, Missouri

== Business ==
The FFL were financed by private funding and public offerings allowing fans to be part-owners of their respective team. When the FFL was announced, co-founder Ricky Williams stated that there are approximately 100 initial stakeholders, including 50 former NFL players. Season ticket holders are planned to have equity stakes. The league would be owned by players, fans and the operators. However, those plans never came to fruition and the FFL was abandoned as of 2021.

== Key people ==
=== Founders ===
- Ricky Williams
- Simeon Rice
- Jeff Garcia
- Dexter Jackson
- Willie Harper
- Akili Smith
- Andre Kirwan
- Bob Whitfield
- Greg Bell
- Jeff Blake
- Kenny Stills Sr.
- Spencer Conley
- Steven Zubkoff
- Todd Yoder
- Victor Butler
- Michael Dotterer
- Mike Jones
- Terrell Owens
- Byron Chamberlain
- Juli Jordan
- Angela Abshier

Rice, Garcia and Jackson are all former players in the United Football League.
