= Major Hockey League =

Major Hockey League may refer to:

- Allan Cup Hockey, formerly known as Major League Hockey
- Major Hockey League, an ice hockey league in Russia
