= Icelandic Society for American Football =

The Icelandic Society for American Football (ISAF) was an Icelandic American football league that played from 1988 to 1991.

== History ==
The ISAF formed when the first three teams appeared on the Icelandic sports scene in 1988. In Icelandic, ISAF was known as "Íslensk Samtök um Amerískan Fótbolta". As in most other European countries, the teams appeared after a new TV station started to show NFL football games. Due to the teams´ emergence within the junior college system in Iceland, ISAF was first planned to be under the umbrella of the intercollegiate system. When it became necessary to accommodate interested players outside of the school-system, the teams got provisional status with local athletic associations. ISAF was then slated to be under the umbrella of Iceland's athletic association, but did not survive long enough to be officially registered as such. However, the local athletics associations served their role notably well by accommodating these experimental teams within their organizations.

ISAF was an informal association jointly run by the leaders of the three teams that formed the league. ISAF organized the first year and half of scrimmages between the teams. This included the recruitment of local Americans and other knowledgeable individuals for participation, training, and team support.

ISAF comprised the following teams (in chronological order of team founding):

1. Garðabæ's Stjarnan, a team that was originally formed in Fjölbrautaskólinn í Garðabæ (jr- college)
2. Grafarvogur's Fjölnir, a team that was originally formed in Menntaskólinn í Reykjavik (Jr-college)
3. Kópavogur's Breiðablik, a team that was originally formed in Menntaskólinn í Kópavogi (Jr-college).

ISAF organized one Icelandic championship tournament in the summer of 1990 at Valbjarnarvöllur in Reykjavik where each team played the two other teams. While the matches were well balanced, the results were in line with each team's experience so far. Garðabær's Stjarnan won both its games, Grafarvogur's Fjölnir came in second, and Kópavogur's Breiðablik came in third. The tournament was officiated by American soldiers stationed at the former US Naval base in Keflavík.

Sometime in 1990, the TV station Stöð 2 stopped showing NFL games. This caused interest to dwindle and ISAF teams found it difficult to attract players, support personnel, and obtain financial sponsorship. During 1991, ISAF stopped organizing 11-on-11 full-contact games. In effect, the departure of NFL broadcasting in Iceland was ISAF's undoing in 1991. This was in stark contrast with the rest of Europe that had continued TV exposure to NFL and experienced steady growth in the sport.

From 2003 onwards, NFL games have again been viewable in Iceland and interest in playing the sport is emerging again.

== Team Logos ==
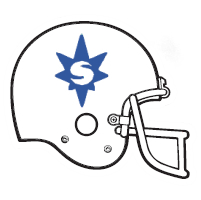
Stjarnan's American Football team.

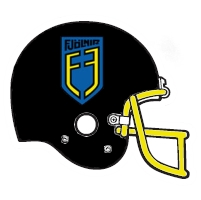
Fjölnir's American Football team.
