= Major League Football (MLF) =

Semi-professional American football league

- Sport: American football
- Founded: 2019
- First season: 2027 (planned)
- Commissioner: Adam McLean
- No. of teams: 30 (planned)
- Country: United States
- Headquarters: Tampa, Florida
- Website: majorleaguefootball.pro

Major League Football (MLF) is a planned professional Fall American football minor league. The league was set to begin play in 2022 after the announcement of several teams, but made an announcement that they were postponing the start of their inaugural season until 2023 and later to October 2024. The start of the League was then postponed again, to September 2026 and later to 2027.

== Premise ==
The MLF will be a developmental "franchise-model" fall League, playing on Sundays in markets that do not have an NFL presence, with attempt to mirror the United Soccer League. The league also claims it is "not a secondary or inferior league to any other professional football league, but instead, a professional football league consisting of the very best players, coaches and staff".

== History ==
MLF website first appeared in 2020 and claimed the league would start in the fall of 2020, while McLean made his first appearance in September 2021 trying to attract investors for a franchise in Louisville.

In August 2022, Sacramento was the league's first announced team, with plans to play in Heart Health Park. In an interview with the Sacramento press, Mclean also said that an Oakland team is slated to play at Laney College and the league was scheduled to begin in October. The league will consist of 18 teams, each playing a 16-game schedule, with eight of them making it to the playoffs - four teams each from the Eastern and Western conferences (three division winners and a wild card qualifier). The MLF claimed that they had secured stadiums leases in 2019 before the COVID-19 pandemic.

The league would later postpone the 2022 season to 2023, citing issues with four stadiums out of the 18 league locations. The planned league markets were North Carolina, West Virginia, Kentucky, Alabama, Arkansas, El Paso, Utah, Iowa, South and North Dakota, Oklahoma, Rochester, Sacramento, Oakland, San Diego and Connecticut.

In 2023 interview McLean stated that the league will consist of 20 teams and they are in the process of hiring general managers, who will then hire coaches and a staff, and will conduct tryouts for prospective players in June. McLean also mentioned some of the venues secured by the league, such as War Memorial Stadium in Arkansas, Pratt & Whitney Stadium in Connecticut, Hughes Stadium in Sacramento and Laney College Stadium in Oakland. Other location mentioned in the interview were Portland, Iowa, Kentucky, North Carolina, Dallas, Houston, San Diego and New York. In a later interview he revealed that the "Portland" franchise will be located in Hillsboro, Oregon and the team will play in Hillsboro Stadium, while the season will start on September 10, 2023 and scheduled to play 15 regular season games ending in mid to late December. The league starting date was later pushed back to 2024.

In July 2026 the league announced that its planned fall 2026 launch has been postponed to 2027. The MLF listed 30 markets, divided into 15-team Eastern and Western conferences, with each conference featuring North, South and Central divisions of five teams. Through its YouTube “Building It” series, the league has revealed 20 of the 30 team names: Connecticut Forge, West Virginia Blasters, Portland (OR) Rapids, Louisiana Bugs, North Carolina Aviators, Montana Stampede, Alabama Bobcats, Orlando Burn (formerly Florida Burn), Wyoming Wranglers, Virginia Colonials, Oakland Beam, Arkansas Blades, North Dakota Harvesters, St. Louis Hops, Georgia (Savannah) Generals, San Diego Surge, Sacramento Rush, Kentucky Sprints, Oklahoma Bison and South Carolina Brigade. Some of these names, including those in Louisiana, Kentucky and South Carolina, remain subject to possible changes. According to the MLF official website the 10 additional unnamed markets are: New York, Rochester, Memphis, Mississippi, South Dakota, Idaho, Iowa, Utah, Nebraska and San Antonio.

== Teams ==
In 2021 the MLF had proposed 32 teams to be split into two conferences, with a buy-in for a Major League Football franchise ranges from $3 million to around $10 million. The number of teams changed multiple times, and as of February, 2026, the league plan is to have 30 teams for the 2026 season.

East
North	Central	South
New York	Charleston, West Virginia	Alabama
Rochester	Arkansas Blades	Kentucky
Connecticut	North Carolina	Georgia Generals
Virginia	South Carolina	Florida
Memphis	Mississippi	Louisiana
West
North	Central	South
North Dakota	Iowa	San Diego
South Dakota	Utah	St. Louis Hops
Montana	Oakland	Nebraska
Wyoming	Sacramento	San Antonio
Idaho	Portland	Oklahoma

== Players and coaches ==
The league plan to target "the best athletes" and "especially former college players", with scheduled combines for prospective players in each of the league’s markets. For the first year, players will be paid as a direct reflection of gross gate revenue and corporate sponsorship, while the money will be placed in a escrow account and will be evenly distributed amongst the players, regardless of position.

MLF "plans to hire up-and-coming coaches that are seeking an opportunity rather than hiring coaches with pro football experience". Coaches and executives salary will be paid by the league.

== Rules ==
According to the league website "there will be less penalties in order to speed up the pace and increase the excitement of the game".

== Business ==
The MLF aim was to attract families and to have affordable with an average price of $50 per game. As of 2023, McLean stated that the league business model will lean into revenue generated from ticket sales, with ticket prices low as $50 and high as $125.

In 2023 McLean stated the league will consist of 20 league-owned teams "for at least the first two seasons before exploring sale options for buyers. We have at least a dozen potential highly-qualified financial buyers ...We want to develop the product, prove that we are the real deal, work out the kinks the first to second season to create the value. We are working on corporate sponsorships".

=== Legal issues ===
The MLF claims it had a trademark on the name "Major League Football" dating back to 2001 and they plan sending a cease and desist letter for trademark infringement to the Major League Football (MLFB).
