= Hawaii Professional Football League =

Professional rugby tournament in Hawaii, USA

- Current season, competition or edition: 2011 HPFL season
- Sport: American football
- Founded: 2010
- Founder: Carson Peapealalo
- First season: 2011
- No. of teams: 4
- Country: United States
- Website: http://www.hawaiiprofootball.com

The Hawaii Professional Football League, or HPFL, was a proposed professional-football league based in the U.S. state of Hawaii, aiming for an inaugural season to start in February 2011 with four teams. The four teams are to be divided into two two-team divisions, the Leeward Division, and the Windward Division. The Waianae Sharks and Honolulu Volcanoes belong to the Leeward Division, and the Kailua Storm and Ko'olau Hurricanes belong to the Windward Division.

Founder and commissioner, Carson Peapealalo, who was a former football player at the University of Hawaii, has confirmed that the league is looking to grow beyond its inaugural 2011 season. He also has said that he will not expand out of the state of Hawaii, or west to another foreign country.

The basic shape of the HPFL is a triangle. The triangle points down, and it represents pride, action, and the community, plus the body, mind and the spirit. The space around the triangle represents the world and/or family that has come together. [as a family]

The current playoff structure consists of all four teams making the playoffs, with two rounds. The two teams in both divisions match up against each other at the homefield of the top seed. The winners of both games meet in the championship game in early March.

== Teams ==
Team	City/Area	Stadium	Founded	Joined	Head coach
Leeward Division
Honolulu Volcanoes	Honolulu	TBA	2010	2011	TBA
Waianae Sharks	Waianae	TBA	2010	2011	TBA
Windward Division
Kailua Storm	Kailua	TBA	2010	2011	TBA
Ko'olau Hurricanes	Kaneohe	TBA	2010	2011	TBA

== Season Structure ==
For the 2011 inaugural season, all four teams will play a six-game regular season, (two games against each other team; one at home, one on the road) over six weeks, which means no BYE weeks like most other football leagues. There will be two playoff rounds, which includes the championship game in March.

== Notable Rules ==
There are some notable differences from other football leagues.

- No touchbacks on kickoffs, unless the ball bounces out of the end zone. (Ball automatically placed on 20-yard line.
- Same overtime rules as college football.
- Endzone and sideline celebrations are allowed. (No excessive celebration penalty)
- 3-point conversion after touchdown will be incorporated. (Ball placed on 10-yard line)
