= Rivals Professional Football League =

Professional football league

- Current season, competition or edition: 2019–20 RPFL season
- Classification: professional league
- Sport: American football
- Founded: 2012
- First season: 2014
- CEO: Quentin Hines
- No. of teams: 12
- Country: United States
- Website: rivalsnation.com

The Rivals Professional Football League (RPFL) is a low-level american football minor league owned by Quentin Hines and consisting of 12 teams in Michigan, Florida and Georgia.

The majority of the league players are on fully incentive based contracts. As result of the pay scale the league is subject to criticism, as some openly called it "a scam".

== History ==
The league was founded in 2012 and played its inaugural season in 2014. The RPFL claims to be a developmental league for players trying to get noticed by the National Football League, Canadian Football League or Arena Football League.

Initially Hines announced that the league will have five teams: Akron Blaze, Chicago Kings, Detroit Cougars, Indianapolis Racers and Southern Michigan Mustangs. At the time, Hines indicated that he was sole owner and would continue as such for the league's first stage before selling franchises. In the end, only two teams played in the first season, Macomb County Bearcats and Detroit Cougars. The Cougars were first season champions, and according to the league, 14 league players end up getting other pro opportunities: four players tried out for the NFL and 10 others earned CFL workouts.

In April 2015, the league indicated two more Michigan teams, Pontiac Generals and Oakland County Racers, with two stadium as game sites, Mount Clemens High School and Wisner Stadium in Pontiac. The Cougars won their second championship, and their star player, DeAndre Smith, signed a $64,100 three-year performance-based contract with the Generals.

For the 2016 season the league added four teams in Miami area: Miami Blaze, Atlantic Sharks, Florida Wolves and South Beach Silverbacks.

For the 2018 season the league added four teams in Georgia: Atlanta Sting, Cobb County Kings, Georgia Power and Peachtree Heat.

in the 2019 season, the South Beach Silverbacks signed a 61 year old rookie name Mark Eberwine, after he attended the league tryouts and selected in the 2019 RPFL draft. Eberwine claims it wasn't a publicity stunt. The Silverbacks won the Conference championship, after defeating the Miami Blaze 28–8.

== Structure and players ==
The league divide to three abbreviated "seasons": the Florida teams play from February to March, the Michigan teams contend from August to September and the Georgia teams compete from November to December. Each team plays a three-week regular season with the top two teams competing for the league championship.

11 of 12 teams are centrally owned and operated by the league (Detroit Cougars owned by Ryan Reed), while each team consists of 50 players with a "small practice squad". Every year the league conducts a draft, consisting of 10 rounds with 20 selections per round to construct the teams rosters.

The registration fee for the league tryout is $200, while salaries can range from $100 to $1,000 a week, but the majority of the players are on fully incentive based contracts. The league also provides housing for $15 a day and charge $400 for equipment. Since December 2021, the league arranged additional "College Bowl" style scouting event, called RPFL Super Bowl, which athletes paid $1,000 to participate.

== Teams ==
=== Michigan Conference ===
Team	Stadium	City
Detroit Cougars'	Bishop Foley Stadium	Madison Heights, Michigan
Michigan Bearcats	Bishop Foley Stadium	Madison Heights, Michigan
Oakland County Racers	Wisner Stadium	Pontiac, Michigan
Pontiac Generals	Wisner Stadium	Pontiac, Michigan

=== Florida Conference ===
Team	Stadium	City
Atlantic Sharks	Ted Hendricks Stadium	Hialeah, Florida
Florida Wolves	Ted Hendricks Stadium	Hialeah, Florida
Miami Blaze	Ted Hendricks Stadium	Hialeah, Florida
South Beach Silverbacks	Ted Hendricks Stadium	Hialeah, Florida

=== Georgia Conference ===
Team	Stadium	City
Atlanta Sting	Silverbacks Stadium	Atlanta, Georgia
Cobb County Kings	Silverbacks Stadium	Atlanta, Georgia
Georgia Power	Silverbacks Stadium	Atlanta, Georgia
Peachtree Heat	Silverbacks Stadium	Atlanta, Georgia

== Notable players ==
- Daunte Akra – former Detroit Lions player.
- Anthony Baskin – former Indianapolis Colts player.
- Mark Eberwine – oldest player in league history (61 years).
- DeVozea Felton – former Birmingham Iron player.
- Joseph Ferguson III - 2018 league MVP most rushing yards recorded in RPFL history in a single game.
- Keith Franklin – former Saskatchewan Rough Riders player and 2016 league MVP.
- Kris Pettus – former New Mexico Stars player.
- Jessie Scroggins – former Wichita Force player.
- Jalen Simmons – former Carolina Panthers player.
- Austin Webster – youngest player in league history (18 years).
- Patrick Ryan - former Cedar Rapids River Kings player and 2017 league MVP.
- Tony Goodman - former Albany Empire player.
