= Association of Professional Football Leagues =

The Association of Professional Football Leagues was a compact formed in 1946 among the National Football League and three minor leagues of professional American football: the American Association (which subsequently changed its name to the American Football League), the Dixie League, and the Pacific Coast Professional Football League. While the NFL had an informal farm system in the pre-World War II AA, this was the first time in which it had a working arrangement with multiple leagues whose local popularity rivaled that of the major league. The agreement lasted less than two years, its termination triggered by the folding of the Dixie League after one of its members jumped to the American Football League one week into the 1947 season.

== Background ==
In the years immediately before the beginning of US involvement in World War II, the local popularity of the Dixie League, the American Association, and the Pacific Coast Professional Football League rivaled that of the NFL (which, in 1940–1941, was battling with an upstart "major league," the third American Football League, which had been raiding the rosters of NFL teams to stock its own), and the NFL had working arrangements with five of the six teams in the AA. The PCPFL benefited from the absence of the NFL west of the Mississippi River and fierce rivalries in the Los Angeles area; similarly, the Dixie League had its strength of support in Virginia and North Carolina (half of the teams were based in the Hampton Roads area), away from the presence of the NFL.

Prior to the 1941 season, the NFL proposed a nationwide “Commissioner of Football” that would govern all major and minor professional football leagues in the United States, similar in scope to the authority wielded by the Commissioner of Baseball, and hired Elmer Layden in that capacity. Then-president Carl Storck was to remain president of the NFL itself, but because he believed the requirements of the position were too vague (and because of declining health), he resigned, and Layden took up both duties, which have been united ever since.

In the wake of the attack on Pearl Harbor, every American professional league was at a crossroads as the American entry into World War II meant that the number of men available to play football would be greatly diminished. The NFL and PCPFL opted to continue; the AA and Dixie League suspended operations after planning to continue play after the end of the war (the third AFL made a similar decision, but did not return).

== Formation ==
In September 1945, Harry Howren, owner of the Norfolk Shamrocks of the Dixie League, revealed in an announcement that not only was the league reorganizing for the 1946 season, but it was also planning to attend a meeting with the AA (which was also reorganizing under a new name, the American Football League) and the PCPFL. Howren also stated, "We want full recognition by the National Football League and its assistance in its protection of players." In the meantime, the NFL's former Cleveland Rams and the newly formed All-America Football Conference announced intentions of playing on the West Coast.

On March 24, 1946, PCPFL president J. Rufus Klawans announced the formation of the Association of Professional Football leagues, with Klawans as chairman and Joe Rosentover, AFL president, as vice chairman. In the announcement, Klawans explained that the association was formed to restrict the jumping of players from one member league to another and to recognize the "territorial rights of its members." He added, "We hope the National as well as all new football leagues, such as the All-America conference… will join our association for the good of professional football." Later that day, NFL president Bert Bell announced that his league would also join after agreeing on few terms with the minor leagues. The AAFC did not become a member.

== Provisions ==
The agreement between the "big three" leagues and the NFL had several provisions.

The NFL agreed to resolve scheduling conflicts with the PCPFL regarding their operations in Los Angeles, where the Bulldogs were the established team and the Rams, formerly based in Cleveland, were the newcomers.

The minor leagues agreed to uphold a five-year ban on NFL players who jumped from the major league to the "big three" (actually just the PCPFL, who signed away several NFL players in 1945, while the other two leagues were inactive). This provision was later applied to players who jumped to the AAFC or any other "outlaw league."

The compact permitted the NFL to establish working relationships with teams in all three minor league circuits (while the AA had such an arrangement with the NFL prior to 1945, the Dixie League did not; the PCPFL generally did not embrace the concept).

A mechanism was put in place to prevent the NFL teams from stockpiling players in the AFL and the Dixie League. Under this prevision, if a player from an NFL team were to be sent to its "farm team," he must be either kept by the destination team or become a free agent. If he were kept by the farm team and later recalled by the NFL team, he could not be returned to the farm team without first becoming a free agent.

While the agreement dealt with rights concerning the movement and hiring of players, it remained silent in terms of territorial rights between minor league teams. It proved to be a fatal error.

== Demise ==
After a 1946 season that saw continued success for the minor leagues, and the NFL weathering the AAFC challenge, no one could envision the quickness of the demise of the Association of American Professional Football Leagues the following fall.

Just before the start of the 1947 season, two members of the Dixie League dropped out of the league, leaving the circuit with only four competing teams. On October 5, 1947, they played the first games of the season. Three days later, the Richmond Rebels of the Dixie League purchased the assets of the defunct Long Island Indians of the AFL and jumped to the other league. Dixie League president Tom Hanes protested to NFL president Bert Bell, who agreed that he did not agree to such a shift, but since it didn’t involve any member team of the National Football League, he – and the Association of American Professional Football Leagues – could do nothing about it.

Left with only three teams, the Dixie League folded the next day. The compact effectively ended when the DL collapsed. On February 4, 1948, the NFL officially ended it by dissolving the links to the AFL.

The Pacific Coast Professional Football League lasted one more season, limping to the end after the Los Angeles Bulldogs moved to a small stadium in Long Beach, California and canceled their last two scheduled games for the 1948 season, ending the league. The AFL lasted through the 1950 season as the transplanted Rebels won the last two championships before the league also folded.
