= International Football Federation =

Proposed American football league

- Sport: American football
- Founded: 1999
- Folded: 1999
- President: Edward Litwack
- No. of teams: 13
- Country: United States
- Last champion: N/A
- Website: Official Site

The International Football Federation was a proposed professional American football minor league. It had intended to launch in spring 2000, but folded while still in its preliminary stages. It is often considered to be one of the shortest-lived high-profile leagues in history, lasting, in the words of one observer, "one press conference."

It was the first sports league in the United States that had plans of streaming its games on the internet.

== League formation and structure ==
The league was unveiled at a press conference in New York City on June 11, 1999, with Dennis Murphy (a co-founder of both the American Basketball Association and World Hockey Association), league president Edward Litwack, and entertainer Dionne Warwick involved in its launch. The plan was to play a 16-game schedule with two preseason contests. The team salary cap would have been $4,000,000, with most players would have been paid between $65,000 and $85,000 while three star players splitting an additional $1,000,000 per team.

=== Teams ===
The team intended to field 13 teams at its launch. These teams would be based in New Jersey (ostensibly, like other professional teams in that state, representing New York), Chicago, Detroit, Boston, Denver, two in Los Angeles, Toronto, San Jose, Texas, Hawaii and Connecticut. Warwick would own a share of both Los Angeles teams, at least one of which would have played at the Rose Bowl. The "New York" team would play at Giants Stadium; Hawaii, the last entry into the league, had plans to play in Aloha Stadium and was to be owned by entertainment promoter Bob Peyton.

Rumors had the names "Toronto Turbos" and "Connecticut Yankees" as two of the team names; no other names were announced or leaked.

== Television and radio ==
The league had preliminary discussions with NBC and Turner Broadcasting but both executives said neither NBC nor Turner would be able to put together a package on such short notice. ESPN was referred to as a league partner. Litwack ran his own cable television systems that he said could be used for a syndicated package and sold individually to local stations or cable networks. He also said the games could be shown on the internet.

Both NBC and Turner looked toward sponsoring another league, deciding initially to back an entirely new league of their own. NBC eventually put its support behind the XFL, which took the field in 2001.
