= American Flag Football League =

American semi-professional flag football league

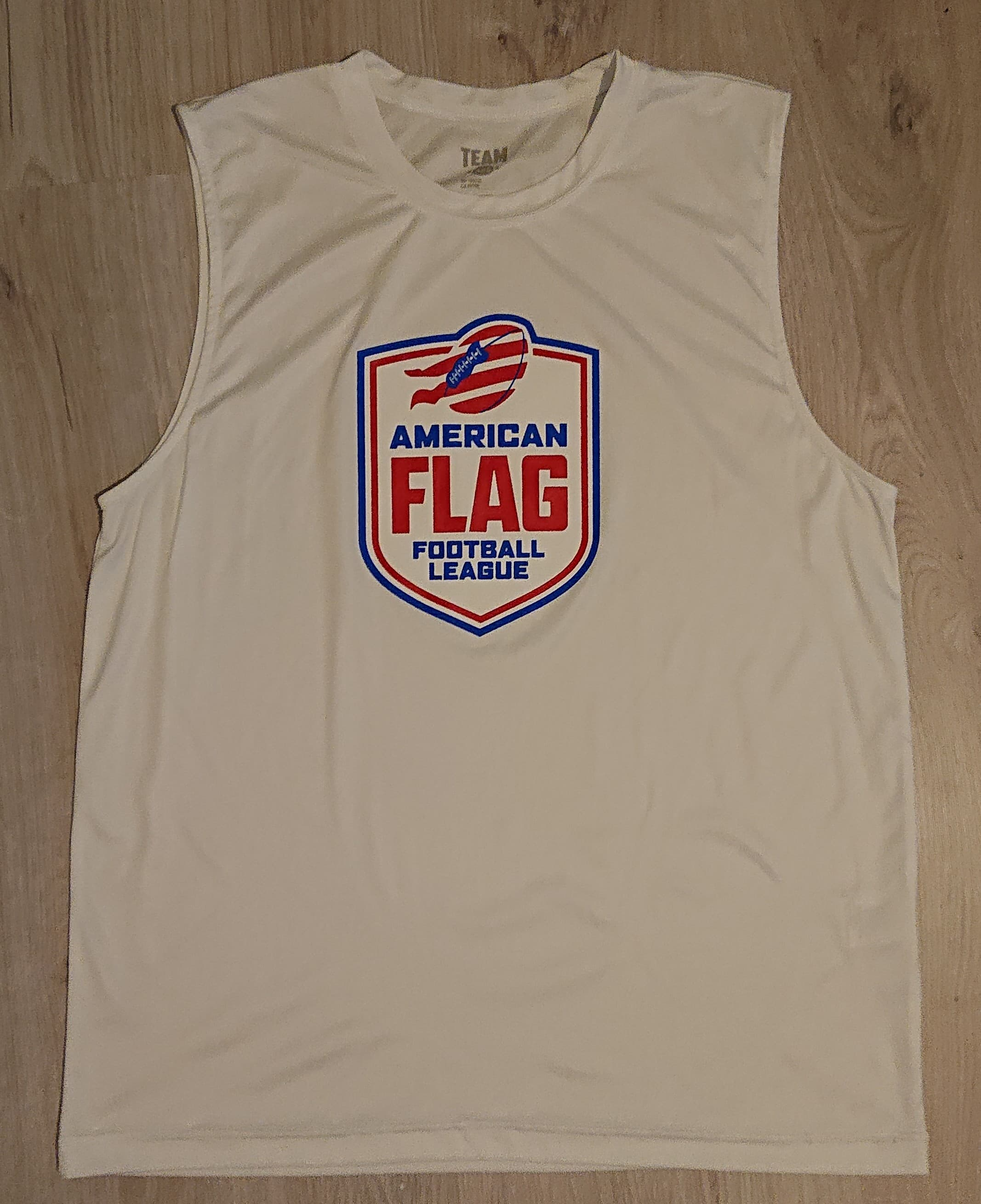
- Sport: Professional Flag football
- Founded: 2017
- First season: 2018
- President: Jeff Lewis
- No. of teams: 4
- Country: United States
- Headquarters: New York
- Website: American Professional Flag Football

The American Flag Football League was a semi-professional flag football league started in 2017. The league was founded by Jeff Lewis in May 2017, and played a tournament-style schedule every summer. League players are not paid during the season and most of them are primarily amateurs, instead cash prizes are awarded to the tournament winners. The AFFL plan to launch a four-team pro league in 2024. However, the AFFL announced in April 2024 that the debut season would be delayed until 2025 with additional teams and a women's division.

The game is played seven players a side with no kicking game and no tackling.

== History ==
Its first official game was an exhibition played between Team Vick (led by former NFL quarterback Michael Vick) and Team Owens (led by former NFL wide receiver Terrell Owens) on June 27, 2017, at PayPal Park in San Jose, California and was broadcast live on the league's website and rebroadcast on their official YouTube channel, The AFFL also had plans to have eight league-owned teams ready to kick off for an inaugural season in 2018.

In 2018, the league began formal play with its first US Open of Football tournament. The tournament format was broken into two converging, single-elimination brackets, with 32 teams of primarily amateurs on one side vying for the title of America's Champion and 4 teams of primarily professional gridiron football players on the other. The two champions would then meet in the Ultimate Final to decide the US Open champion. Prior to the US Open, the amateur bracket was narrowed down to 32 teams from a field of 124 teams via regional qualifiers. The winning team will take home a $1,000,000 prize. For the 2019 and 2021 seasons, the winning team prize money was $200,000.

In 2021 the league added a women's division, with The Academy defeating She Blitz 26-0 and winning the $200,000 prize money.

=== 2022–present ===
The league cancelled the 2022 tournament with an aim to move from knockout tournament to a regular professional league, with four to six teams that will play doubleheaders over a 10-week season to be launched in 2023. In October 2022, the league sold its first franchises (Boston and Las Vegas) for $3 million each, while the league mentioned an ongoing discussions about a third franchise in Pittsburgh, with other teams targeted in Florida and Texas. In March 2023 the AFFL pushed the league starting date to 2024, after failing to secure additional owners, franchises and playing locations on time. The league also mentioned they aim to start a women's league in 2025. The AAFL also stated the men's and women's amateur tournaments will continue.

In October 2023 the AFFL announced the league will launch on Saturday, April 27, 2024, with four-teams eight-week season. The teams will be located in Dallas and Nashville in addition to the already announced Boston and Las Vegas. The Championship Game will be played in the Ford Center at The Star in Frisco, Texas. The teams will barnstorm around the five locations, as all will be playing at the same location each weekend, with each team will play two games a day, for a total of four games at each venue weekly. In April, 2024 the league delayed its launch until the spring of 2025.

== Teams ==
The American Flag Football League inaugural season will kick off with four teams in five locations:

Club	City	Stadium	Capacity	Head coach
Boston Brigade	Quincy, Massachusetts	Veterans Memorial Stadium	5,000	Matt Bailey
Dallas Ocelots	Dallas, Texas	Gerald J. Ford Stadium/ Ford Center at The Star	32,000; 12,000	Patrick Alley
Las Vegas Lucky Sevens	Las Vegas, Nevada	Cashman Field	12,500 (Note: Approximate capacity, including standing room and lawn seating. Cashman Field has 9,334 fixed seating, and it can expand to 14,500 with temporary bleachers.)	Jerry Urias
Nashville Nighthawks	Nashville, Tennessee	Vanderbilt University Soccer Complex	1,000	Chris Hughes

== Players and coaches ==
For the 2024 season the league announced the hiring of the four head coaches for the inaugural season, all with a deep background in flag football: Patrick Alley (Dallas), Chris Hughes (Nashville), Matt Bailey (Boston) and Jerry Urias (Las Vegas).

On November 21, 2023, the AFFL announced their core players for its inaugural season, as many of the players have competed for USA Football in the 2022 World Games in Birmingham, Alabama. The AFFL's pro men's league plan to pay players $1,000 a week, plus travel and away game expenses.

== Rules ==
=== General rules ===
- 7-on-7, with 12-man roster
- 60-minute game
  - 1st half: 30 minutes total; running clock for the first 29 minutes and in the final minute, clock stops only for scoring plays and penalties
  - 2nd half: 30 minutes total; running clock for the first 28 minutes and traditional clock stoppage for the final two minutes
- Field will be divided into four 25-yard boxes, and first downs are awarded each time the offense reaches the next box
- No blocking, no kicking, no fumbles Kickoffs are replaced with a long throwoff. No touchbacks.
- Only 1 lateral allowed per play; 2 laterals on throw off and punt returns
- Incidental contact is permitted
- Winners moves on to the next round, losers are eliminated in a knockout tournament.

=== Post-snap ===
- Once the ball is snapped, the defense has to wait two seconds to rush and the quarterback will have a total of four seconds to release the ball or cross the line of scrimmage. Laterals turns the Go clock off as the ball is out of the quarterbacks hands.
- The quarterback cannot run unless rushed
- All players are eligible downfield, except for the designated center on offense, who must stay on the spot to mark the line of scrimmage.
- North-south handoffs are not allowed, but pitches and handoffs to runners running east–west are permitted
- The defense can blitz three times per half without waiting for two seconds

=== Scoring ===
- 6 pts per touchdown under 50 yards, 7pts for touchdowns over 50 yards
- Teams will have option based on distance to convert PATs of 1, 2 or 3 points. If that pass is picked off, and returned to the opposite endzone, 2 points will be scored.

=== Penalties ===
- Most penalties will not award yardage, but rather a free play or loss of down
- Ball will generally go into play at the spot of the foul or the previous spot

== Champions ==
Year	America's Champion	Pro Champion	Final score
2018	Fighting Cancer	Godspeed (Captain(s): M. Johnson/J. Forsett)	26–6
2019	Fighting Cancer	Texas Money Team	22–14
2020	Canceled due to COVID-19 pandemic		
2021	Kings of Florida	Freaks	2-1 (Note: Best-of-3 series (46-47, 26-13, 14-0))

== Media coverage ==
In 2018, the league reached a broadcast deal with NFL Network, covering the final 11 games of the U.S. Open of Football tournament. The league is leveraging technologies such as using a skycam as the primary angle, on-field graphics (such as a color-changing line of scrimmage and clock) for the league's "Go Clock" rule, and microphones on players.

For the 2021 season, the AFFL reached a broadcast deal with CBS Sports, covering the 2021 tournament's Men's Final and the inaugural Women's Division Final.
