= Florida Football Alliance =

American football semi-professional league

- Sport: American football
- First season: 2008
- President: Terrence Page Sr.
- No. of teams: 16
- Country: United States
- Most recent champion: SW Florida Gladiators
- Most titles: Miami "Magic City" Bulls (6)
- Website: hostedsports.net/ffa

The Florida Football Alliance (FFA) was an American football semi-professional league based out of Boynton Beach, Florida. Founded in May 2007, the league opened its first season of operation on January 19, 2008. Member teams are divided into two separate conferences, Alliance and Florida. Within each of the respective conferences, there were two divisions and all teams played a 10-game regular season schedule that traditionally began in late January. At the end of the regular season, qualified teams competed in a postseason playoff schedule which began in April. The champion of each respective conference then compete for the league championship in the final game of the year, dubbed the "Alliance Bowl".

== Alliance Bowl ==
Game	Date	Winning team	Score	Losing team	Venue	City	Ref
I	May 3, 2008	Miami "Magic City" Bulls	30–18	Bradenton Gladiators	Municipal Stadium	Daytona Beach, Florida	
II	May 2, 2009	Port St. Lucie Bobcats	40–34	Miami "Magic City" Bulls	Municipal Stadium (2)	Daytona Beach, Florida (2)	
III	May 1, 2010	Orlando Rage	40–34	Miami "Magic City" Bulls (2)	Hodges Stadium	Jacksonville, Florida	
IV	April 30, 2011	Miami "Magic City" Bulls (2)	56–50	Orlando Rage	Municipal Stadium (3)	Daytona Beach, Florida (3)	
V	May 5, 2012	Orlando Rage (2)	35–30	Bradenton Gladiators (2)	Ansin Sports Complex	Miramar, Florida	
VI	May 25, 2013	Miami "Magic City" Bulls (3)	61−28	Orlando Rage (2)	Tropical Park Stadium	Miami, Florida	
VII	May 3, 2014	Miami "Magic City" Bulls (4)	50−29	Bradenton Gladiators (3)	Municipal Stadium (4)	Daytona Beach, Florida (4)	
VIII	May 30, 2015	SW Florida Gladiators	51−27	Miami "Magic City" Bulls (3)	Municipal Stadium (5)	Daytona Beach, Florida (5)	
IX	May 14, 2016	Miami "Magic City" Bulls (5)	34−20	Tampa Bay Patriots	Municipal Stadium (6)	Daytona Beach, Florida (6)	
X	May 20, 2017	Miami "Magic City" Bulls (6)	58−31	Tampa Bay Patriots (2)	Ronald L Book Athletic Stadium (1)	North Miami Beach, Florida (1)	
XI	May 19, 2018	SW Florida Gladiators (2)	17−14	Twin County Raiders	Municipal Stadium (7)	Daytona Beach, Florida (7)	
XII	May 18, 2019	SW Florida Gladiators (3)	29−0	South Florida Wolverines	Municipal Stadium (8)	Daytona Beach, Florida (8)	
(Note: The FFA championship in 2021 was dubbed the "Federation Bowl".)	2021	SW Florida Gladiators (4)	23−12				

== Notable players ==
- Michael Lynch − former player for the Bradenton Gladiators in 2018; holds the Guinness World Record for oldest American football player, aged 68 during his appearance with the Gladiators.
