= IFAF Junior World Championship =

American football competition

- Sport: American football
- Founded: 2009
- No. of teams: 8 in 2024
- Most recent champion: Canada (4th title)
- Most titles: Canada (4 titles)

The IFAF Junior World Championship or IFAF World Junior Championship is a biennial competition for American football which ran from 2009 to 2020 and was the precursor of the quadrennial IFAF U20 World Cup with the first event played in 2024 in Edmonton, Canada.

== IFAF U19 World Cup ==
The IFAF U19 World Cup is the precursor of the IFAF U20 World Cup. The U19 World Cup was the world championship of American football for players under the age of 19 organized by the International Federation of American Football. From 2012 through 2018, the age designation "U-19" was used in the tournament title. An age adjustment ratified by IFAF has repositioned the premiere junior competition as the U20 IFAF World Junior Championship in 2024 hosted in Edmonton, Alberta on a four-year cycle.

The first competition started in June 2009, at Canton, Ohio. The tournament replaced the eleven-year running NFL Global Junior Championship and was held every two years.

== IFAF U20 World Cup ==
The first iteration of the competition was known as the IFAF Junior World Cup and served as the world championship of American football for players age 20 and under organized by the International Federation of American Football.

The 2020 championships scheduled for Canton, Ohio were cancelled in March due to the coronavirus pandemic. A 2021 event was scheduled for Vancouver, Canada to replace the 2020 event, but was cancelled in March due to the pandemic.

2024 marked the event's return to the IFAF calendar in Edmonton, Alberta, where Canada secured a historic three-peat with a 20-9 win over Japan.

A 2026 event in Kawasaki, Japan, was eventually not sanctioned by IFAF. The future of the event is undetermined as of winter 2026.

== Results ==
=== Men ===
Year	Host	Final			Third-place game		
Year	Host	Winner	Score	Runner-up	3rd place	Score	4th place
2009; Details	United States	United States	41–3	Canada	Japan	42–27	Mexico
2012; Details	United States	Canada	23–17	United States	Japan	7–0	Austria
2014; Details	Kuwait	United States	40–17	Canada	Mexico	31–30	Austria
2016; Details	China	Canada	24–6	United States	Mexico	24–7	Japan
2018; Details	Mexico	Canada	13–7	Mexico	United States	61–9	Sweden
2024; Details	Canada	Canada	20–9	Japan	Austria	32–25	United States
