= American football in the United States =

Most popular sport in the United States

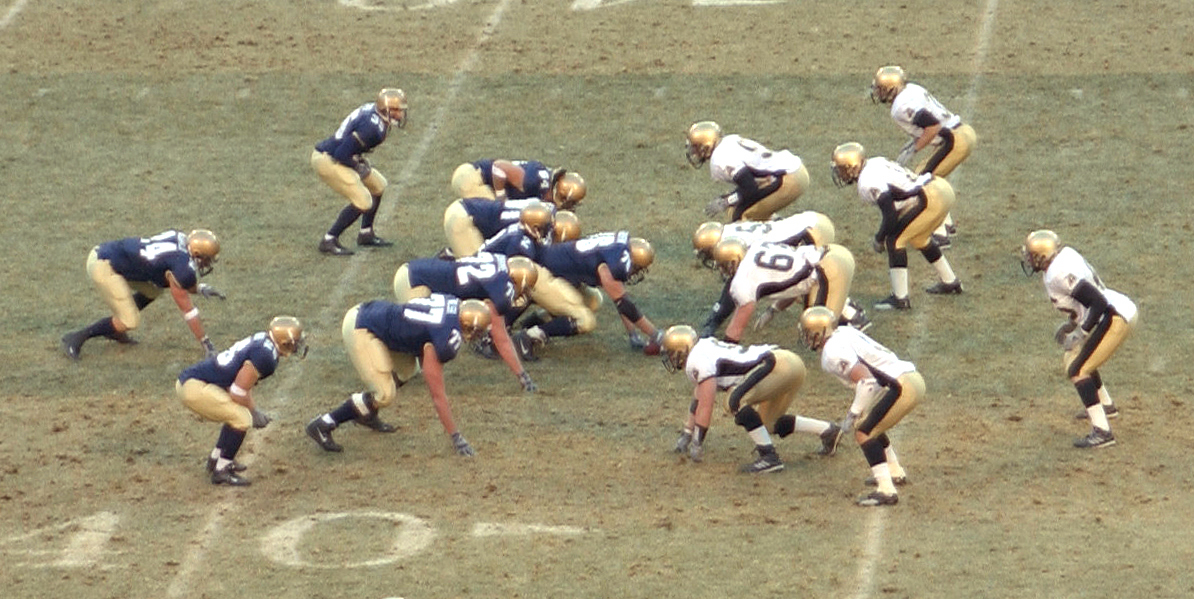
- The Navy Midshipmen (left in blue) line up on offense against the Army Black Knights in the annual Army–Navy Game at Giants Stadium in December 2002
- Country: United States
- Governing body: USA Football
- National team: United States
- First played: September 17, 1869 (157 years ago) in New Brunswick, New Jersey
- Registered players: 5 million+

Club competitions
- List: Men's: National Football League (Tier-1; Major league) United Football League (Tier-2; High-level minor league) Gridiron Developmental Football League (Tier-3; Low-level minor league) Rivals Professional Football League (Tier-3; Low-level minor league) Women's: Women's Football Alliance (semi-professional) Women's National Football Conference (semi-professional)

International competitions
- IFAF World Championship

American football is a form of gridiron football and the most popular sport in the United States. In the United States, the game is most often referred to as simply "football". Football is played in leagues of different size, age and quality, in all regions of the country.

There is no single national governing body for American football in the United States or a continental governing body for North America. There is an international governing body, the International Federation of American Football, or IFAF. The National Football League has the highest revenue and average attendance of any sports league in the world.

== Description ==
American football is the most popular sport in the United States. It is a form of gridiron football. In the United States, the game is most often referred to as simply "football".

== Organization in the United States ==
Befitting its status as a popular sport, football is played in leagues of different size, age and quality, in all regions of the country. A team is sometimes referred to as a "football program". There is no single national governing body for American football in the United States or a continental governing body for North America. There is an international governing body, the International Federation of American Football (IFAF). The governing body for American football in the United States is USA Football. The Super Bowl is the final championship of American football in the NFL.

=== Professional ===
==== National Football League ====
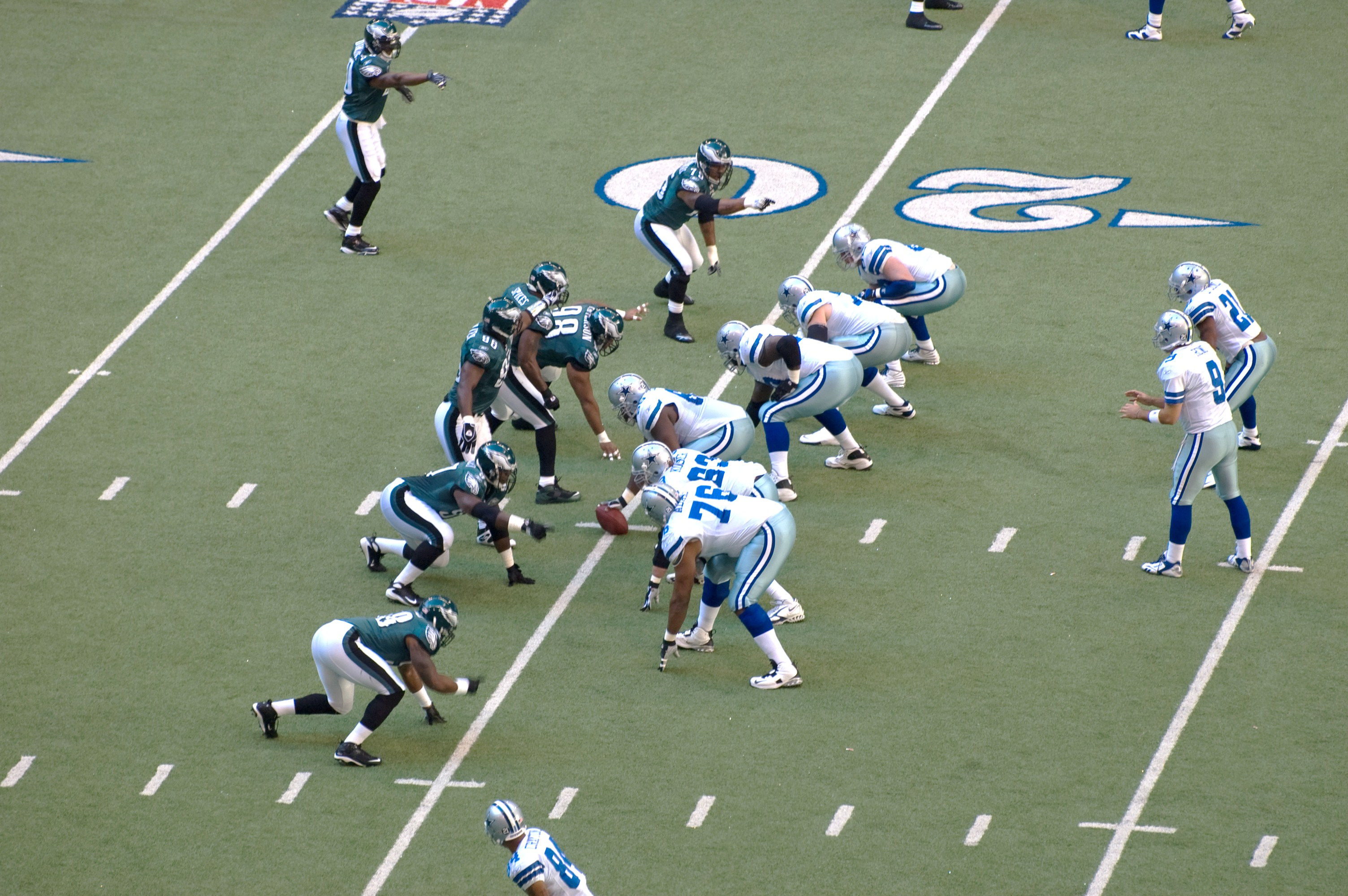
The Dallas Cowboys (right in white) play the Philadelphia Eagles (left in green) at AT&T Stadium in Arlington, Texas, in December 2007

The 32-team National Football League (NFL) is currently the only major professional American football league in the United States. There have been numerous attempts over the past several decades to create a second major or high-level professional league, most of which failed within a few years or, in the cases of the All-America Football Conference and 1960s American Football League, merged with the NFL. The National Football League has the highest revenue and average attendance of any sports league in the world.

The NFL has not operated any developmental minor leagues since the folding of the NFL Europe League in 2007. There are some "independent" leagues operating in the US, but they are not overseen by the NFL and the teams has no affiliation to NFL franchises.

These figures reflect the popularity of professional American football as a spectator sport:

Team	2016	2017	2018	2019	2021	2022	2023	2024	2025
Arizona Cardinals	62,410	62,622	62,622	62,622	62,622	62,622	62,864	67,850	63,975
Atlanta Falcons	68,115	67,586	67,944	67,944	67,944	67,586	67,944	67,679	70,995
Baltimore Ravens	70,745	70,537	70,537	70,537	70,537	70,589	70,681	68,979	70,294
Buffalo Bills	71,240	67,816	67,763	67,816	67,816	68,431	68,660	69,953	70,695
Carolina Panthers	74,418	72,211	72,211	72,211	71,906	71,351	71,951	69,905	72,311
Chicago Bears	60,618	60,834	60,488	60,834	60,834	60,834	61,769	67,831	58,282
Cincinnati Bengals	60,866	60,325	60,492	60,125	60,325	60,325	64,148	68,791	66,040
Cleveland Browns	67,522	67,431	67,431	67,681	67,431	67,431	67,681	67,431	67,431
Dallas Cowboys¹	91,767	92,125	91,619	90,929	93,421	93,465	93,594	92,972	92,991
Detroit Lions	63,004	63,423	63,877	63,423	63,423	63,423	68,741	72,389	64,850
Denver Broncos	76,446	76,446	76,446	75,937	76,236	75,980	76,388	73,969	75,313
Green Bay Packers	77,707	77,875	77,834	77,845	77,991	76,180	77,829	78,003	77,875
Houston Texans	66,748	66,811	66,812	66,811	66,811	66,811	67,960	68,024	70,782
Indianapolis Colts	62,616	62,475	62,515	62,475	62,475	62,475	65,230	70,616	65,041
Jacksonville Jaguars	58,818	59,968	60,370	60,370	60,370	59,968	60,370	66,162	65,764
Kansas City Chiefs	75,850	75,850	75,850	75,237	73,227	73,499	73,499	72,972	73,512
Las Vegas Raiders	54,584	57,775	57,919	52,549	61,185	61,185	61,185	69,489	62,362
Los Angeles Chargers	71,598	71,402	71,598	71,240	71,598	72,734	72,205	70,603	73,411
Los Angeles Rams	70,900	70,700	70,800	70,500	71,365	71,598	72,205	70,413	69,736
Miami Dolphins	67,115	64,374	64,207	64,374	64,374	64,230	64,374	67,909	65,922
Minnesota Vikings	67,120	66,701	66,650	66,701	66,701	66,701	67,810	69,088	66,286
New England Patriots	62,616	62,475	62,515	62,475	62,475	62,475	65,230	70,616	65,041
New Orleans Saints	65,845	64,929	65,697	64,929	64,929	64,929	65,712	69,823	70,012
New York Giants	76,423	76,940	76,940	74,664	73,882	76,474	79,307	78,470	80,557
New York Jets	77,763	76,113	77,982	78,523	71,676	78,009	77,890	78,789	73,666
Philadelphia Eagles	69,296	69,796	69,913	69,797	69,796	69,869	69,794	73,857	69,879
Pittsburgh Steelers	59,775	60,488	60,173	60,488	60,488	60,488	60,488	67,960	67,440
San Francisco 49ers	71,629	71,629	71,466	71,048	71,629	71,629	71,122	70,572	71,422
Seattle Seahawks	68,302	68,408	68,402	68,408	68,735	68,735	68,408	71,482	68,740
Tampa Bay Buccaneers	60,624	59,952	54,356	50,728	65,372	65,000	67,046	63,689	67,202
Tennessee Titans	68,366	68,566	68,368	68,566	68,616	68,616	64,520	67,085	59,221
Washington Commanders	52,377	52,751	54,034	53,991	52,751	52,751	63,950	73,793	64,279
League average	66,018	65,856	65,798	65,714	65,759	65,820	66,792	66,631	69,424

¹ ~80,000 without people watching on screens at the party decks

==== Minor leagues ====
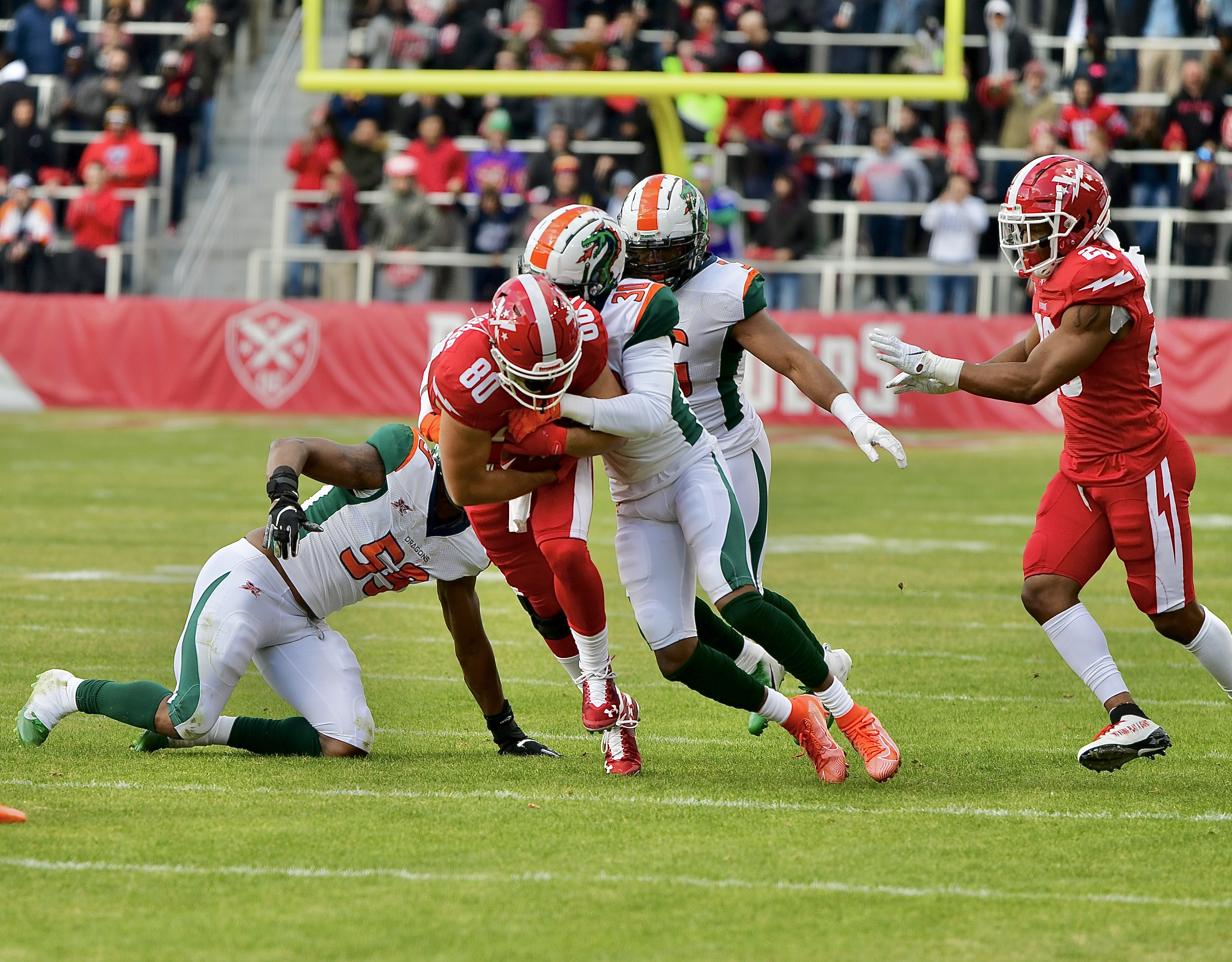
The DC Defenders (red) and Seattle Dragons (white), two teams in the XFL, a professional league that has undergone three incarnations in its history

The eight-team United Football League is the predominant professional spring football league. It originated with the XFL and the USFL, each originally founded and played as separate eight-team leagues in 2020 and 2022 respectively before agreeing to a merger with each other. Both conferences bore the names of leagues before them: the USFL was named after a 1980s major professional league known as the United States Football League and reached a settlement with the remaining rightsholders to that league; the XFL was a revival of a 2001 league of the same name from the same founder, Vince McMahon, who sold the league and brand with its 2020 season unfinished. The XFL and USFL brands continued as conferences after the merger until Mike Repole took over the league and abolished the brands during the 2025 offseason. A third-tier league, the Continental Football League, is slated to launch in 2026.

Other active minor league are the Gridiron Developmental Football League and the Rivals Professional Football League which are viewed as low-level or semi-pro leagues.

==== Indoor American football ====
There are several professional and semi-professional indoor American football leagues, played at hockey-sized arenas. The largest and oldest operating league is the Indoor Football League which has 13 teams spanning from Ohio to California mostly in markets with other major or high-minor professional sports franchises. Historically the Arena Football League, which launched in 1987 was the most prominent league but as the league had operational issues following its 2008 bankruptcy, teams folded and left for other leagues before the Arena Football League folded in 2019. An attempt at reviving the Arena Football League collapsed a few weeks into its only season in 2024, with the remaining teams reorganizing to play out the season; this league abandoned the AFL brand to become Arena Football One (AF1), which plays in mostly suburban and mid-sized cities.

Other pro leagues include the second-tier National Arena League, the Great Plains and Mississippi Valley-based The Arena League (a league originally playing six-man football), and the third-tier regional and semi-professional leagues such as American Indoor Football (Iowa and Michigan) and the American Arena League (East Coast). AF1 accepted the champions of both TAL and the NAL following their 2025 seasons, while sending two of their rural franchises to the NAL.

Indoor football leagues play by significantly different rules that accommodate a field of play half the width and length of a traditional football field.

==== Other professional football leagues ====
Some American players compete in the Canadian Football League in Canada, which operates professionally on a somewhat older rule system with a number of differences from the American game but still recognizable as "football" to the casual American football observer. The CFL allocates half of its teams' rosters for players born and raised in Canada but allows the rest of the players to be foreign born (in practice, these spots are almost always filled by Americans); the CFL also has television presence in the United States and as recently as 1995 played games in the U.S.

=== College football ===
Alabama Crimson Tide football fans tailgate on the main campus of the University of Alabama

In the United States, college football is governed by the National Collegiate Athletic Association (NCAA). Many colleges and universities have football teams, often with dedicated football stadiums. These teams mostly play other similarly sized schools, through the NCAA's divisional system, which divides collegiate sports teams into four divisions (I-FBS, I-FCS, II and III). The largest, most popular collegiate teams routinely fill stadiums larger than 75,000.

Among college football stadiums, eight, the University of Michigan's Michigan Stadium, Penn State's Beaver Stadium, Ohio State's Ohio Stadium, Texas A&M's Kyle Field, the University of Tennessee's Neyland Stadium, LSU's Tiger Stadium, Alabama's Bryant–Denny Stadium, and Darrell K Royal–Texas Memorial Stadium at the University of Texas at Austin, seat over 100,000 fans and typically sell out. The weekly autumn ritual of college football, which includes marching bands, cheerleaders, homecoming, parties, tailgate parties, form an important part of college football's culture. Football is a major source of revenue to the athletic programs of schools, public and private, in the United States. Top college football players enter the NFL draft after their college careers are over, in hopes of signing with an NFL team.

"FBS" and "FCS" are abbreviations for the Football Bowl Subdivision and Football Championship Subdivision, two sections of Division I that exist only in football. These two subdivisions were formerly known as Divisions I-A and I-AA respectively. The Championship Subdivision, consisting mostly of smaller schools than the FBS but larger than D-II, has a multiple-round playoff system just like Divisions II and III, while the Bowl Subdivision has only a limited, and unofficial, twelve-team playoff and has historically only featured division championships and bowl games. FBS and FCS teams can, and often do, play against each other. Unofficially, the Bowl Subdivision is divided into two further subdivisions, "major conferences" (also known as "Power Five conferences", since reduced to four with the breakup of the Pac-12 Conference) and "mid-majors" (known in modern parlance as the "Group of Five"). In practice, only major conference teams are eligible to compete for the national championship and receive significant favor in the opinion polling over mid-majors, and it was not until the addition of the BCS National Championship Game that mid-majors had a realistic chance at appearing in one of the major bowls. Although the FCS has a playoff, three conferences do not participate (the Ivy League does not allow its teams to play in the postseason, and the historically black SWAC and MEAC instead play each other in a bowl of their own). Division III teams do not offer scholarships to their players; two Division I FCS leagues also do not offer scholarships—the Ivy League, which prohibits athletic scholarships in any sport, and the Pioneer Football League, which only competes in football and whose members all offer scholarships in non-football sports.

With the exception of the annual Army–Navy Game, only Power Five conference teams air on national broadcast television, although mid-majors, FCS teams, D-II and D-III games can see more limited coverage on cable and local television.

Though the NCAA is the most publicized college athletic organization, the NAIA (which houses mostly smaller private colleges in the midwest) also sanctions football games. At the community college level, the NJCAA oversees the sport in 47 of the 48 contiguous states, the lone exception being California, where the California Community College Athletic Association (CCCAA) operates outside the bounds of the NJCAA. There also exists a club football circuit for student-run teams and colleges that choose not to compete at the varsity level. In addition to this, 10 northeastern colleges field teams in the Collegiate Sprint Football League, a league in which all players must weigh no more than 178 pounds (81 kg) in order to be eligible to play; a second sprint league based in the midwest, the Midwest Sprint Football League, launched in 2021.

The Michigan Wolverines drew the highest average home attendance of all college football teams in 2025. These figures reflect the popularity of college football as a spectator sport:

#	College football team	Average attendance
1	Michigan Wolverines	110,842
2	Penn State Nittany Lions	107,093
3	Texas A&M Aggies	106,159
4	Ohio State Buckeyes	104,105
5	Texas Longhorns	102,367
6	LSU Tigers	101,575
7	Tennessee Volunteers	101,915
8	Alabama Crimson Tide	100,077
9	Georgia Bulldogs	93,033
10	Florida Gators	90,125
11	Auburn Tigers	88,043
12	Nebraska Cornhuskers	86,549
13	Oklahoma Sooners	83,532
14	South Carolina Gamecocks	79,334
15	Clemson Tigers	79,142
16	Notre Dame Fighting Irish	77,622
17	Wisconsin Badgers	70,403
18	Michigan State Spartans	70,389
19	Arkansas Razorbacks	69,762
20	Iowa Hawkeyes	69,250
21	Washington Huskies	68,238
22	USC Trojans	67,783
23	Ole Miss Rebels	66,772
24	Florida State Seminoles	65,876
25	Miami Hurricanes	63,834
26	BYU Cougars	63,789
27	Iowa State Cyclones	60,862
28	Texas Tech Red Raiders	60,143
29	Virginia Tech Hokies	59,946
30	Oregon Ducks	58,582
31	Illinois Fighting Illini	58,350
32	Kentucky Wildcats	57,779
33	Missouri Tigers	57,321
34	NC State Wolfpack	56,919
35	Purdue Boilermakers	56,581
36	West Virginia Mountaineers	54,506
37	Arizona State Sun Devils	54,444
38	Mississippi State Bulldogs	53,186
39	Pittsburgh Panthers	51,845
40	Kansas State Wildcats	51,773
41	Utah Utes	51,701
42	Indiana Hoosiers	51,184
43	North Carolina Tar Heels	50,500
44	Colorado Buffaloes	50,469
45	Louisville Cardinals	50,292
46	Virginia Cavaliers	48,776
47	Rutgers Scarlet Knights	48,459
48	Georgia Tech Yellow Jackets	47,694
49	Minnesota Golden Gophers	46,519
50	Oklahoma State Cowboys	44,664
51	UCF Knights	43,409
52	TCU Horned Frogs	43,319
53	Arizona Wildcats	41,782
54	Boston College Eagles	41,090
55	Maryland Terrapins	40,765
56	Kansas Jayhawks	39,478
57	Baylor Bears	39,447
58	Syracuse Orange	38,605
59	Fresno State Bulldogs	38,030
60	UCLA Bruins	37,282
61	East Carolina Pirates	37,097
62	Cincinnati Bearcats	36,052
63	California Golden Bears	34,991
64	Vanderbilt Commodores	34,813
65	SMU Mustangs	33,530
66	South Florida Bulls	33,194
67	Boise State Broncos	32,891
68	Houston Cougars	32,215
69	Navy Midshipmen	31,960
70	Colorado State Rams	31,901
71	Appalachian State Mountaineers	31,813
72	UNLV Rebels	31,589
73	UConn Huskies	30,444
74	Oregon State Beavers	30,145
75	Memphis Tigers	30,097
76	Wake Forest Demon Deacons	29,433
77	Jackson State Tigers	28,733
78	Army Black Knights	28,390
79	Stanford Cardinal	28,171
80	Southern Miss Golden Eagles	27,912
81	Air Force Falcons	26,665
82	Washington State Cougars	26,527
83	Montana Grizzlies	26,464
84	San Diego State Aztecs	26,189
85	Marshall Thundering Herd	25,298
86	New Mexico Lobos	25,252
87	James Madison Dukes	25,135
88	North Texas Mean Green	24,493
89	UTSA Roadrunners	24,361
90	Duke Blue Devils	24,283
91	Tulane Green Wave	24,068
92	Troy Trojans	24,053
93	Wyoming Cowboys	23,433
94	Rice Owls	23,423
95	Georgia Southern Eagles	22,541
96	Southern Jaguars	22,051
97	Montana State Bobcats	21,877
98	Norfolk State Spartans	21,212
99	Toledo Rockets	21,199
100	Ohio Bobcats	21,007
101	Tarleton State Texans	20,841
102	Alabama State Hornets	20,618
103	Western Michigan Broncos	20,194
104	Jacksonville State Gamecocks	19,993
105	Louisiana Ragin' Cajuns	19,982
106	UAB Blazers	19,702
107	Utah State Aggies	18,855
108	Old Dominion Monarchs	18,583
109	Texas State Bobcats	18,565
110	Bowling Green Falcons	18,556
111	Liberty Flames	18,371
112	Coastal Carolina Chanticleers	18,352
113	Nevada Wolf Pack	17,875
114	Florida Atlantic Owls	17,667
115	South Dakota State Jackrabbits	17,640
116	Temple Owls	17,566
117	Louisiana–Monroe Warhawks	17,486
118	South Alabama Jaguars	17,273
119	Arkansas State Red Wolves	16,964
120	Delaware Fightin' Blue Hens	16,751
121	Tulsa Golden Hurricane	16,369
122	Central Michigan Chippewas	16,277
123	North Dakota State Bison	16,048
124	UTEP Miners	15,818
125	Georgia State Panthers	15,500
126	Sacramento State Hornets	15,468
127	Eastern Michigan Eagles	14,842
128	Western Kentucky Hilltoppers	14,772
129	Alabama A&M Bulldogs	14,111
130	Florida A&M Rattlers	14,093
131	San Jose State Spartans	13,997
132	Holy Cross Crusaders	13,931
133	FIU Panthers	13,864
134	Buffalo Bulls	13,808
135	Hawaiʻi Rainbow Warriors	13,708
136	Louisiana Tech Bulldogs	13,682
137	Charlotte 49ers	13,564
138	UC Davis Aggies	12,991
139	South Carolina State Bulldogs	12,702
140	UTRGV Vaqueros	12,539
141	Yale Bulldogs	12,398
142	North Carolina A&T Aggies	12,282
143	Middle Tennessee Blue Raiders	12,252
144	Miami RedHawks	11,658
145	North Dakota Fighting Hawks	11,603
146	Northwestern Wildcats	11,548
147	Missouri State Bears	11,547
148	Western Carolina Catamounts	10,986
149	Kennesaw State Owls	10,743
150	The Citadel Bulldogs	10,652
151	William & Mary Tribe	10,508
152	McNeese Cowboys	10,417

=== High school ===
In the United States, most high schools have football teams. High school football is popular; top schools regularly fill stadiums holding over 10,000 fans, and can afford artificial playing surfaces.

High school teams generally play only against other teams from their state; notable exceptions include matchups between nearby schools located on opposite sides of a state line and occasional matchups between two nationally-ranked teams for television purposes. Some private Christian high schools play for national championships through organizations like the Federated Christian Athletic Association. Public high school football in most states, as is the case with other high school sports, is governed by the National Federation of State High School Associations (NFHS).

For rural schools that do not have the student body to support a full football team, NFHS sanctions nine-man football, which is popular in the upper Midwest. In other regions of the U.S., six-man football is popular in Texas, and eight-man football is the most common reduced-man format in most other states.

=== Adult amateur football and semi-pro football ===
Adult amateur football, also known as semi-pro football, is a level of American football. It is commonly known as "working man's" football, meaning the players have regular jobs and play football on the weekends. Though the players do not get paid, the leagues and the games are run in a somewhat professional manner. For most leagues, it is against the rules to pay its players to play. The rules of the game are usually a hybrid of NFL and NCAA rules.

There are several leagues, regional in nature, which play in the United States:

League	First season	Type	Geographical area
Amateur to Professional Developmental Football League	2013	Outdoor	Southeast
East Coast Football League	2013	Outdoor	New England
Eastern Football League	1961	Outdoor	Northeastern
Empire Football League	1969	Outdoor	New York State
Florida Football Alliance	2008	Outdoor	Florida
Mason-Dixon Football League	1978	Outdoor	Mid-Atlantic
MidStates Football League	1999	Outdoor	North Central
Minor Football League	1993	Outdoor	Eastern & Central United States
North Louisiana Football Alliance	2020	Nine-man football	South Central
New England Football League	1994	Outdoor	New England
Pacific Coast Football League	2006	Outdoor	California
Pacific Northwest Football League	2016	Outdoor	Pacific Northwest
Rocky Mountain Football League	1997	Outdoor	Rocky Mountains

Several leagues supporting women's semi-professional football play have existed. The current major league is the Women's Football Alliance (WFA). The WFA started to play in 2009 stocked with teams from two dissolved leagues, the National Women's Football Association and Women's Professional Football League (NWFA and WPFL respectively).

=== Other codes ===
American 7s Football League (A7FL) is a semi-professional league which plays a seven-man version of gridiron football, while the American Flag Football League plays a variant of American football where, instead of tackling players to the ground, the defensive team must remove a flag or flag belt from the ball carrier to end a down.

=== US National American football team ===
USA Football assembles a national football team for competition in the IFAF World Championship every four years. Because of concerns over competitive balance, USA Football did not field teams for the first two events in 1999 and 2003. The 2007 team consisted solely of amateur players who had graduated from college that spring, from a diverse mix of smaller and larger colleges and universities. The 2011 squad's criteria were looser, allowing some professional players to play (mostly unemployed, lower-end and minor league players; no NFL or NCAA stars participated). Both the 2007 and 2011 incarnations of the team won their year's respective world championship.

The IFAF also fields an U-19 team composed of high school football players that has participated in the 2009, 2012, 2014 and 2016 junior world championships. The national U-19 team won the 2009 and 2014 contests but lost the 2012 contest to Canada.

=== Women's football in the United States ===
Women's football teams in the United States have had many sports leagues. Among them are the Women's Professional Football League (1965–1973), the Women's Professional Football League, the Independent Women's Football League, the Women's Football Alliance, and the X League. In 1970, Patricia Palinkas became the holder of the Orlando Panthers and became the first woman to play in the Atlantic Coast Football League, and in 2010 Katie Hnida became the kicker for the Fort Wayne FireHawks in the Continental Indoor Football League.

== See also ==
- List of American and Canadian football leagues
- List of American football films
- National Football League
- Women's American football in the United States
