= 2014 in American football =

- December 21, 2013 – January 6, 2014: 2013–14 College Bowls
  - December 21, 2013: Famous Idaho Potato Bowl at Boise
    - San Diego State defeated Buffalo 49–24.
  - December 21, 2013: Las Vegas Bowl
    - USC defeated Fresno State 45–20.
  - December 21, 2013: New Mexico Bowl at Albuquerque
    - Colorado State defeated Washington State 48–45.
  - December 21, 2013: New Orleans Bowl
    - LA-Lafayette defeated Tulane 24–21.
  - December 23, 2013: Beef 'O' Brady's Bowl at St. Petersburg
    - East Carolina defeated Ohio 37–20.
  - December 24, 2013: Hawaii Bowl at Honolulu
    - Oregon State defeated Boise State 38–23.
  - December 26, 2013: Little Caesars Pizza Bowl at Detroit
    - Pittsburgh defeated Bowling Green 30–27.
  - December 26, 2013: Poinsettia Bowl at San Diego
    - Utah State defeated Northern Illinois 21–14.
  - December 27, 2013: Fight Hunger Bowl at San Francisco
    - Washington defeated BYU 31–16.
  - December 27, 2013: Military Bowl at Annapolis, Maryland
    - Marshall defeated Maryland 31–20.
  - December 27, 2013: Texas Bowl at Houston
    - Syracuse defeated Minnesota 21–17.
  - December 28, 2013: Belk Bowl at Charlotte, North Carolina
    - North Carolina defeated Cincinnati 38–17.
  - December 28, 2013: Buffalo Wild Wings Bowl at Tempe, Arizona
    - Kansas State defeated Michigan 31–14.
  - December 28, 2013: Pinstripe Bowl at The Bronx (New York City)
    - Notre Dame defeated Rutgers 29–16.
  - December 28, 2013: Russell Athletic Bowl at Orlando, Florida
    - Louisville defeated Miami (FL) 36–9.
  - December 30, 2013: Alamo Bowl at San Antonio
    - Oregon defeated Texas 30–7.
  - December 30, 2013: Armed Forces Bowl at Fort Worth, Texas
    - Navy defeated Middle Tennessee 24–6.
  - December 30, 2013: Holiday Bowl at San Diego
    - Texas Tech defeated Arizona State 37–23.
  - December 30, 2013: Music City Bowl at Nashville, Tennessee
    - Ole Miss defeated Georgia Tech 25–17.
  - December 31, 2013: AdvoCare V100 Bowl at Shreveport, Louisiana
    - Arizona defeated Boston College 42–19.
  - December 31, 2013: Chick-fil-A Bowl at Atlanta
    - Texas A&M defeated Duke 52–48.
  - December 31, 2013: Liberty Bowl at Memphis, Tennessee
    - Mississippi State defeated Rice 44–7.
  - December 31, 2013: Sun Bowl at El Paso, Texas
    - UCLA defeated Virginia Tech 42–12.
  - January 1, 2014: Capital One Bowl at Orlando, Florida
    - South Carolina defeated Wisconsin 34–24.
  - January 1, 2014: Fiesta Bowl at Glendale, Arizona
    - UCF defeated Baylor 52–42.
  - January 1, 2014: Gator Bowl at Jacksonville, Florida
    - Nebraska defeated Georgia 24–19.
  - January 1, 2014: Heart of Dallas Bowl
    - North Texas defeated UNLV 36–14.
  - January 1, 2014: Outback Bowl at Tampa, Florida
    - LSU defeated Iowa 21–14.
  - January 1, 2014: Rose Bowl Game at Pasadena, California
    - Michigan State defeated Stanford 24–20.
  - January 2, 2014: Sugar Bowl at New Orleans
    - Oklahoma defeated Alabama 45–31.
  - January 3, 2014: Cotton Bowl at Dallas
    - Missouri defeated Oklahoma State 41–31.
  - January 3, 2014: Orange Bowl at Miami Gardens, Florida
    - Clemson defeated Ohio State 40–35.
  - January 4, 2014: BBVA Compass Bowl at Birmingham, Alabama
    - Vanderbilt defeated Houston 41–24.
  - January 5, 2014: GoDaddy Bowl at Mobile, Alabama
    - Arkansas State defeated Ball State 23–20.
  - January 6, 2014: BCS National Championship Game at Pasadena, California
    - #1 Florida State defeated #2 Auburn 34–31.
- January 26: 2014 Pro Bowl in Halawa, Hawaii (outside of Honolulu) at Aloha Stadium
  - Team Rice defeated Team Sanders 22–21.
- February 2: The National Football League championship, Super Bowl XLVIII, at MetLife Stadium in East Rutherford, New Jersey
  - Seattle Seahawks defeated the Denver Broncos 43–8, to claim its first title.
- May 30 – June 7: 2014 EFAF European Championship in Austria (final stage takes place at the Ernst-Happel-Stadion in Vienna)
  - Germany defeated Austria, 30–27, to claim its third title. France took the bronze medal.
- July 5 – 17: 2014 IFAF U-19 World Championship in Kuwait City
  - The United States defeated Canada, 40–17, to claim its second IFAF junior title. Mexico took the bronze medal.
- July 11 – 13: 2014 IFAF Europe Champions League Final Four in Élancourt
  - Helsinki Roosters defeated SBB Vukovi Beograd, 36–29, to claim the debut ECL title.
- July 19: 2014 EFAF Eurobowl in Berlin
  - Berlin Adler defeated fellow German team, the New Yorker Lions, 20–17, to claim its second Eurobowl title.
- September 4 – December 28: 2014 NFL season
  - American Football Conference season winner: New England Patriots
  - National Football Conference season winner: Seattle Seahawks
- September 10 – 12: 2014 IFAF Flag Football World Championship in Grosseto
  - Note: This event was scheduled to take place in Jerusalem, from August 12 – 15. However, the 2014 Israel–Gaza conflict gave the IFAF the go-ahead to move the event from there to alternate host nation of Italy, on July 28, 2014.
  - Men -> Champions: United States; Second: Mexico; Third: Italy
  - Women -> Champions: Canada; Second: United States; Third: Austria

== Pro Football Hall of Fame ==
- Class of 2014:
  - Derrick Brooks, player
  - Ray Guy, player
  - Claude Humphrey, player
  - Walter Jones, player
  - Andre Reed, player
  - Michael Strahan, player
  - Aeneas Williams, player
