= Rafael Duk =

Mexican gridiron football coach & player (born 1962/63)

Current position
- Title: Head coach
- Team: Burros Blancos IPN

Biographical details
- Born: 1962 or 1963 (age 63–64)
- Education: IPN

Playing career
- 1984–1989: Pieles Rojas IPN
- Position: Guard

Coaching career (HC unless noted)
- 1994–2001: ITESM CEM
- 2002: Pieles Rojas A.C.
- 2003: UAdeC
- 2004: Petroleros de Pemex
- 2005: Pieles Rojas A.C.
- 2005–2012: UVM
- 2016–2017: Raptors de Naucalpan
- 2018: Mexicas CDMX
- 2019–2022: Bulldogs de Naucalpan
- 2019–2022: Búhos IPN
- 2023–present: Burros Blancos IPN

Accomplishments and honors

Championships
- As player: 1 ONEFA (1989); As head coach: 1 Tazón México (III); 1 ONEFA (2000); 2 ONEFA National Conference (1996, 2005); 1 ONEFA National Central Conference (2022); 1 FADEMAC (2019); 1 Liga OMFA Pro (2002)

Awards
- 6 ONEFA Coach of the Year (1996–2000, 2005)

Rafael Duk
Medal record

Men's American football

Head coach for Mexico

IFAF U19 World Championship
Bronze medal – third place	2014 Kuwait	Team
Bronze medal – third place	2016 Harbin	Team

NFL Global Junior Championship
Bronze medal – third place	2003 San Diego	Team
Bronze medal – third place	2007 Miami	Team

Assistant head coach for Mexico

World Championship
Silver medal – second place	2003 Germany	Team

Offensive coordinator for Mexico

World Championship
Silver medal – second place	1999 Palermo	Team

Rafael Duk Delgado (born 1962/63) is a Mexican gridiron football coach and former player who is the current head coach of the Burros Blancos IPN. He played college football with the Pieles Rojas IPN, winning an ONEFA national championship in 1989. As a head coach, Duk won the 2000 ONEFA national championship with the Borregos Salvajes CEM before leading the Mexicas CDMX to a win in Tazón México III in 2018.

== Playing career ==
Duk played college football with the Pieles Rojas IPN at the guard position, representing the Instituto Politécnico Nacional from 1984 to 1989. He was a part of the 1989 ONEFA national championship team under head coach Manuel Rodero.

== Coaching career ==
Duk was hired as the first head coach of the Borregos Salvajes CEM for their debut season in ONEFA in 1994, where they began in the second-tier National Conference. He led the team to its historic first win in their opening game, beating the Toros Salvajes Chapingo 39–27. Duk guided the team to a 6–1 record and an appearance in the National Conference championship game, where they lost 13–0 to the Panteras Negras UAM. After losing in the championship game again the following year, the team was successful in its third attempt, defeating the Lobos UAdeC 28–6 in the 1996 National Conference championship game after an undefeated season and earning promotion to the 10 Grandes Conference – the highest ONEFA tier.

In 2000, Duk led the Borregos Salvajes CEM to another undefeated season and its first-ever ONEFA national championship, defeating the Borregos Salvajes Monterrey 38–28 in the 10 Grandes Conference final. He earned five consecutive ONEFA Coach of the Year awards from 1996 to 2000. Duk quit following the 2001 season, in which his team was eliminated in the semifinals by the Auténticos Tigres UANL.

Duk won a Liga OMFA Pro championship in 2002 as head coach of the semi-pro Pieles Rojas A.C. In 2003, he coached the Lobos UAdeC of the Autonomous University of Coahuila, though the team finished the season with a losing record. He returned to the semi-pro ranks after that, coaching the Petroleros de Pemex in 2004 and the Pieles Rojas A.C. in 2005.

=== Linces UVM ===
Duk took the reins of the Linces UVM of the Universidad del Valle de México in 2005 as the new team's first-ever head coach. In his first season, he led the team to a promotion to the top-tier 12 Grandes Conference after winning the second-tier National Conference title. Duk earned his sixth ONEFA Coach of the Year award and became the first head coach to achieve promotion to the top tier with two different teams. He was replaced by Roberto Cervantes, his defensive coordinator, following the 2012 season.

Duk was subsequently offered the head coaching job of the Toros Salvajes Chapingo, but was unable to accept for personal reasons.

=== Raptors de Naucalpan ===
In November 2015, Duk was announced as the first head coach of the Raptors de Naucalpan, members of a new professional spring league called the Liga de Fútbol Americano Profesional (LFA). In the league's inaugural season in 2016, the team finished the season with a 4–2 record and reached Tazón México I, the first edition of the LFA championship game, where they lost 29–13 to the Mayas CDMX.

In 2017, Duk led the Raptors to a 5–2 record and a first-place finish in the North Division, with league MVP Bruno Márquez at quarterback. However, they were eliminated in the first round of the playoffs after suffering a 13–10 defeat to the Dinos de Saltillo.

=== Mexicas CDMX ===
In October 2017, Duk joined another LFA team, the Mexicas CDMX, as their new head coach. In his only season with the team, he led the Mexicas to its first league championship with a 17–0 victory over the Raptors de Naucalpan in Tazón México III after finishing the regular season with a 4–3 record.

=== Bulldogs de Naucalpan ===
In September 2018, Duk was announced as the head coach of the Bulldogs de Naucalpan of the Liga de Football Pro (later Fútbol Americano de México), a new football league that began its inaugural season that February to compete with the LFA.

=== Búhos IPN ===
In 2019, Duk was named the sixth head coach in the history of the Búhos IPN program, which was returning to Mexican football for the first time since 1985. In his first year at the helm, he led the team to an undefeated season capped off by a 41–15 victory over the Lobos Plateados IPN to win the FADEMAC league title. The 2020 season was cancelled due to the COVID-19 pandemic. In 2021, the Búhos returned to ONEFA, after a 36-year absence, as a member of its Center-South Conference. Duk led the team to a 3–1 record, sitting atop of the Group A standings when the rest of the season was also cancelled. The Búhos subsequently won the third-tier National Central Conference title in 2022, defeating the Frailes del Tepeyac 20–17 in the final.

=== Burros Blancos IPN ===
Duk was named the head coach of the Burros Blancos IPN ahead of the 2023 season.

=== National team ===
Duk served as the offensive coordinator for the Mexico national team at the 1999 IFAF World Championship held in Italy, helping the team win a silver medal. He won another silver medal at the 2003 edition held in Germany, this time as an assistant head coach.

As a head coach, Duk led Team Mexico to bronze medals at the 2003 and 2007 NFL Global Junior Championships held in San Diego and Miami, respectively. He also commandeered the Mexico under-19 national team to consecutive bronze medals at the 2014 and 2016 editions of the IFAF U-19 World Championship held in Kuwait and China, respectively.

== Personal life ==
Duk studied business administration at the Universidad del Valle de México.

Duk coached his son, Rafael Duk Ochoa, on the Búhos IPN.
