= 2020 IFAF World Junior Championship =

American football season

IFAF World Junior Football Championship

Tournament details
- Host nation: United States
- Dates: June – July
- No. of nations: 4, 6 or 8

The 2020 IFAF U-19 World Championship was scheduled as an international American football tournament for junior teams (19 years and under) which would have taken place at Canton, Ohio from late June to early July 2020. This would have been the second time that Canton, Ohio hosted an IFAF World Junior Championship, the first being the inaugural 2009 IFAF Junior World Championship.

The event was cancelled by IFAF in March 2020 due to complications from the coronavirus pandemic. The next world junior championship is a U-20 competition that was hosted by Football Canada in Edmonton, Alberta in July 2024.

== Participants and seeding ==
The dates for the participants were not announced by IFAF or USA Football prior to the tournament. Based on continental competitions, these are the available teams based on IFAF ranking:

- 1. Canada - defending champions
- 2. Mexico - IFAF Americas #1
- 3. United States - host Nation
- 4. Japan - IFAF Asia #1
- 5. Australia - IFAF Oceania
- 6. Austria - IFAF Europe #1
- 7. Sweden - ranked at #4 based on 2018 finish
- 8. IFAF Americas #4 - Panama or Brazil
