= Blowout (sports) =

One-sided victory

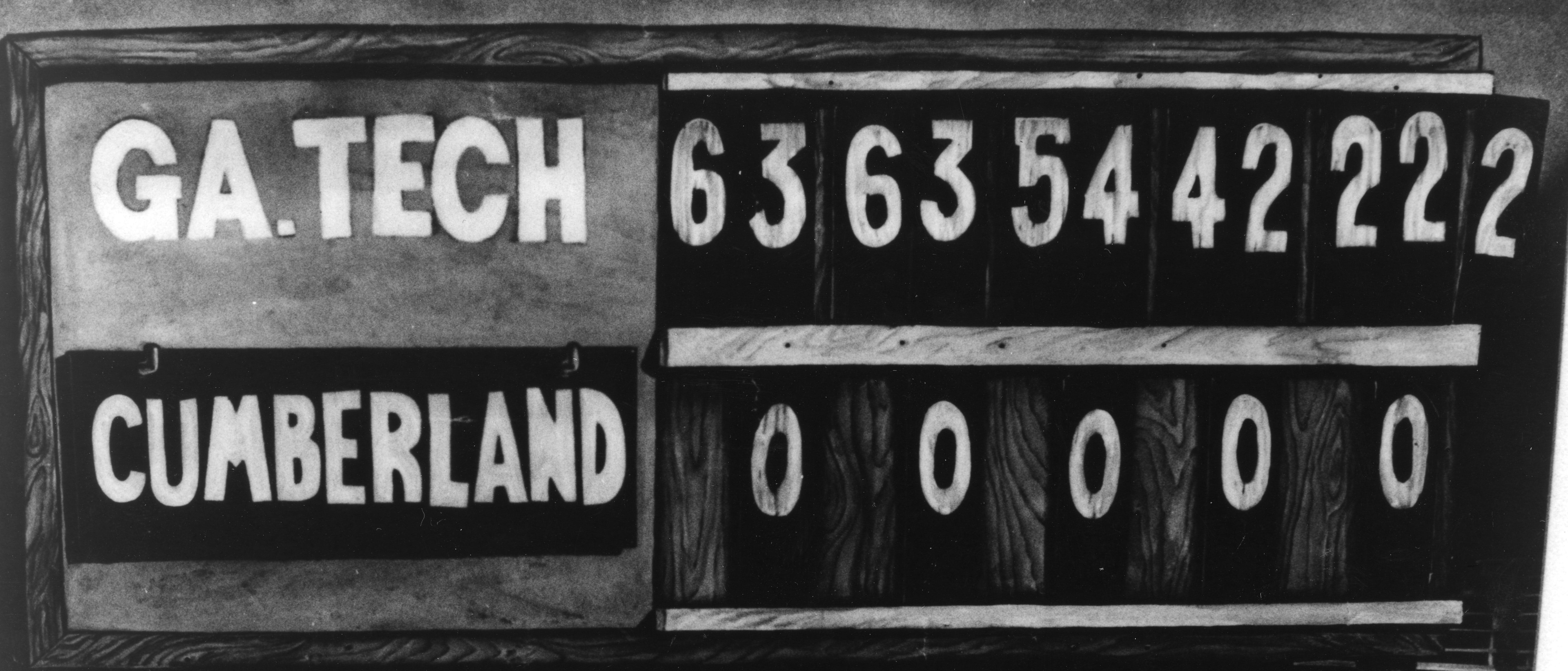
In 1916 Georgia Tech, coached by John Heisman, defeated Cumberland College 222-0 in a college American football game–the biggest blowout in the sport's history.

In sports, a blowout, walkover or rout is an easy or one-sided victory. It occurs when one athletic team or individual performer outscores another by a large margin or in such a fashion that the second team or individual has little chance of a victory. The term "blowout" is often used in reference to athletic competition, but it is used in other contexts such as electoral politics (see also the synonym landslide).

== Ethics and sportsmanship ==
During blowouts, some coaches and players are challenged by the ethics and sportsmanship of the event. Some believe it is not appropriate to give full effort when winning by a blowout margin or to "run up the score". Others believe that in athletic competition one is supposed to give full effort at all times.

Continuing to give full effort, and especially running up the score, can lead to the losing team becoming angry or upset. Yelling, fights and players being removed from the game often take place when a team is being blown out because the losing team is frustrated and embarrassed. During the portion of the game that is played after the outcome has been decided, which is known in the USA as garbage time, most teams rest many of their better players and play reserves who do not regularly play in their place. This keeps the regular players from getting injured and allows them to have a rest. It also gives the reserves a chance to get experience under game conditions. During blowouts fans will often chant for their favourite reserve players to get playing time and cheer loudly when this player does well.

However in some sports, maintaining a large margin of victory must be done in order to retain the lead in statistical tiebreaker computations for playoff contention, and in other sports such as baseball, a strong inning or comeback win by the trailing team is always possible in pressure situations, due to the non-timed nature of the sport.

== Notable blowouts ==
Some of the most one-sided sporting victories are given below:

=== American football ===
==== College football ====
- In the 1916 Cumberland vs. Georgia Tech football game, Georgia Tech defeated Cumberland College by a score of 222–0. The game was called "the biggest blowout in football history" by Los Angeles Times columnist Paul Aurandt in 1983. Georgia Tech rushed for 1,650 yards and did not allow a first down by Cumberland.
- In a record-setting season of blowouts, the 1901 Michigan Wolverines football team defeated its opponents over the course of the entire season by a combined score of 550–0.

==== NFL ====
- In 1940, the Chicago Bears beat the Washington Redskins 73–0 in the league's championship game. Chicago coach George Halas reportedly showed his players newspaper clippings in which George Preston Marshall, the Redskins' owner, called the Bears "crybabies and quitters" after the Redskins beat the Bears 7–3 in the regular season.
- In 2025, the Philadelphia Eagles beat the Washington Commanders in that season's NFC Championship by a score of 55-23 to advance to Super Bowl LIX. This was the largest amount of points ever scored in an NFC or AFC championship, beating the previous record of 51 points set by the Buffalo Bills in the 1991 AFC Championship.

==== International ====
- In the 2014 IFAF U-19 World Championship, Canada defeated Kuwait 91–0.
- In the 2024 IFAF World Junior Championship the record for points scored and point spread in a sanctioned international American football game was Canada's 110–0 win over Brazil on 22 June 2024.

=== Association football ===
==== Club (men) ====
- In 1885, Arbroath defeated Bon Accord of Aberdeen in a Scottish Cup match by a score of 36–0.
- In 2002, the coach of Madagascar's Stade Olympique de l'Emyrne team staged a protest by directing his players to score at will—against themselves. The final score was 149–0, with players on the winning team (Adema) not scoring any of the goals.

==== International (men) ====
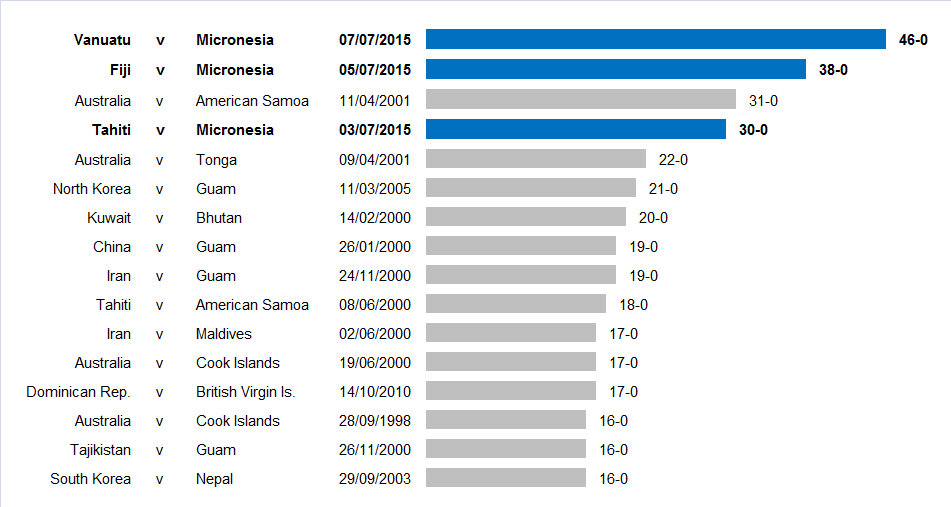
A bar chart contextualising Bhutan's defeat against Kuwait amidst the largest margins of victory in international football since 1997. (Note: The blue bars highlight the Federated States of Micronesia national under-23 football team's performance in the 2015 Pacific Games; as of June 2016, the worst performance by any national representative team at an official event.)

- In the 1979 South Pacific Games, Fiji defeated Kiribati 24–0.
- In 2001, Australia beat American Samoa 31–0 during an Oceanian qualifying match for the 2002 FIFA World Cup.
- In the 1971 South Pacific Games, Tahiti defeated the Cook Islands 30–0.
- In the 2015 Pacific Games, the Micronesia under-23 national team lost 0–30 against Tahiti, 0–38 against Fiji and 0–46 against Vanuatu.
- Bahrain 10–0 Indonesia - The match ended as the biggest win for Bahrain, and the biggest defeat for Indonesia. This match is known for a FIFA match-fixing investigation afterwards.
- 2023 EAFF U-15 Men's Championship U15 Japan 26-0 Guam
- 2025 AFC U-17 Asian Cup qualification U17 Tajikistan 33-0 Guam

==== International (women) ====
- In the 2001 AFC Women's Championship, North Korea defeated Singapore 24–0.
- In qualifying for the FIFA Women's World Cup, five games in history have ended 21–0.
- A European 2023 FIFA Women's World Cup qualification match that ended England 20–0 Latvia led to debate about changes in the qualification system.

=== Australian rules football ===
==== AFL ====
- In 1979, Fitzroy defeated Melbourne 238–48.

=== Baseball ===
==== Major League Baseball ====
- In 1897, the Chicago Colts of the National League defeated the Louisville Colonels 36–7.
- The modern record (i.e., post-1900) for margin of victory was set in 2007, when the Texas Rangers defeated the Baltimore Orioles 30–3. The 30 runs are also a modern-era record for runs scored in a nine-inning MLB game by one team.

=== Basketball ===
==== NBA ====
- On 2 December 2021, the Memphis Grizzlies beat the Oklahoma City Thunder 152–79.

==== Olympic Games ====
- During the 1976 Summer Olympics, UPI described a 129–63 victory by the Soviet Union over Japan in men's basketball as "the most one-sided blowout of the current Olympic competition.".
- In the highest scoring performance by any team in Olympic history, the U.S. men's basketball team beat Nigeria 156–73 in the 2012 Olympics.

=== Beach soccer ===
- In a 2005 FIFA Beach Soccer World Cup qualification match, Brazil defeated Mexico 23–3.
- In a 2013 FIFA Beach Soccer World Cup qualification match, Iran defeated the Philippines 20–0.

=== Canadian football ===
==== CFL ====
- On 24 August 1959, the Edmonton Eskimos defeated the Saskatchewan Roughriders 55–0.
- On 29 July 2017, the Calgary Stampeders defeated the Hamilton Tiger-Cats 60–1.

==== IRFU/WIRFU ====
- In the 1923 Grey Cup, Queen's University defeated the Regina Rugby Club 54–0.
- In 1956, the Montreal Alouettes defeated the Hamilton Tiger-Cats 82–14.

=== Cricket ===
==== Test format ====
- In the fifth test of the 1938 Ashes series, England defeated Australia by an innings and 579 runs. Winning the toss and choosing to bat first, England declared after scoring 903 runs for the loss of 7 wickets. In reply, Australia were bowled out for 201 runs in their first innings and 123 runs in their second innings.

==== ODI format ====
- In 2008, New Zealand defeated Ireland by 290 runs. New Zealand's opening pair James Marshall and Brendon McCullum put on a first wicket partnership of 274 runs and batted through 42.2 overs. New Zealand posted a total of 402 runs for the loss of 2 wickets and bowled out Ireland for 112 runs in 28.4 overs.

==== Twenty20 format ====
- In 2007, Sri Lanka defeated Kenya by 174 runs (201–27) in a match in Johannesburg, South Africa.
- In 2024, during African sub regional qualifiers for T20 WC 2026, Zimbabwe (then ranked 12th) beat Gambia (then ranked 95th) by a huge margin of 290 runs (344 — 54).

=== Floorball ===
==== Men ====
- In the men's 2009 Men's Asia Pacific Floorball Championships, Japan defeated India 59–0.

==== Women ====
- In a 2021 Women's World Floorball Championships qualification game, Sweden defeated France 61–0.

=== Formula 1 ===
- In F1, the largest winning margin is 2 laps, which has occurred twice. Sir Jackie Stewart accomplished the feat at the 1969 Spanish Grand Prix, while Damon Hill achieved the same winning margin at the 1995 Australian Grand Prix.
- The largest winning margin outright was of Stirling Moss, who won the 1958 Portuguese Grand Prix by 5 minutes, 12 seconds.

=== Futsal ===
==== Men ====
- In 1991, Brazil defeated Uruguay 38–3.
- In 1999, Iran defeated Singapore 36–0.
- At the 2006 Lusophony Games, Brazil defeated Timor-Leste 76–0 and Portugal defeated Timor-Leste 56–0.

==== Women ====
- In 2005, Iran defeated Turkmenistan 32–1 and Iraq 26–1.

=== Golf ===
==== PGA Tour ====
- Three players have won PGA Tour matches by 16 strokes: J.D. Edgar at the 1919 Canadian Open; Joe Kirkwood Sr. at the 1924 Corpus Christi Open; and Bobby Locke at the 1948 Chicago Victory National Championship.
- Tiger Woods has the largest margin of victory since 1950 with a 15-stroke win at the 2000 U.S. Open.

=== Handball ===
- Teenage Girls: Russia 76–1 Kyrgyzstan (+75 GD) - 5 August 2023 - 2023 CIS Games
- Women's Junior: Japan 95–8 Kyrgyzstan (+87 GD) - 22 August 2025 - 2025 Asian Women's Junior Handball Championship
- U17 Men: KOR 84 - 16 MDV (+68 GD) - 16 September 2025 - 2025 Asian Men's U-17 Handball Championship
- 2019 World Women's Handball Championship: FRA 46-7 AUS (+39 GD)
- 2023 World Men's Handball Championship: SWE 47-12 URU (+35 GD)

=== Horse racing ===
- Secretariat won the 1973 Belmont Stakes by 31 lengths to win the Triple Crown. Previously, Man O' War and Count Fleet had also both won the race by over 20 lengths, with Man O' War winning by 20 in 1920, and Count Fleet by 25 in 1943, with Count Fleet's victory ensuring his own Triple Crown.
- Man O' War won the 1920 Lawrence Realization Stakes by around 100 lengths in a race against one other horse, Hoodwink.

=== Ice hockey ===
==== NHL ====
- On January 23, 1944, the Detroit Red Wings beat the New York Rangers 15–0.

==== International (men) ====
- At the 1987 Ice Hockey World Championships, Australia defeated New Zealand 58–0.
- At the 1998 IIHF Asian Oceanic Junior U18 Championship, South Korea beat Thailand 92–0.

==== International (women) ====
- In 2008, Slovakia beat Bulgaria 82–0 in a 2010 Winter Olympics qualification tournament.

=== NASCAR ===
- In 1965, Ned Jarrett won the Southern 500 at Darlington Raceway by 14 laps over 2nd place Buck Baker and 19 laps over 3rd and 4th-place finishers Darel Dieringer and Roy Mayne. It is still the largest margin of victory in NASCAR.

=== Roller Derby ===
- Women International: 2018 Russia 6–635 Sweden (+629 GD) - 2018 Roller Derby World Cup
- Men International: 2014 Sweden 0–363 England (+363 GD) - 2014 Roller Derby World Cup

=== Rugby union ===
==== Men ====
- At the 2003 Rugby World Cup, Australia defeated Namibia by a score of 142–0.

==== Women ====
- 1994 Women's Rugby World Cup: USA 121-0 JPN (+121 GD) - USA 111-0 SWE (+111 GD)
- 1998 Women's Rugby World Cup: NZL 134-6 GER (+128 GD)
- 2002 Women's Rugby World Cup: NZL 117-0 GER (+117 GD)
- 2014 Women's Rugby World Cup: NZL 121-0 HKG (+121 GD)

=== Tennis ===
- In the 1974 US Open, Jimmy Connors defeated Ken Rosewall 6–1, 6–0, 6–1, the most lopsided defeat in any Grand Slam final.
- At the 1988 French Open, Steffi Graf, en route to the first ever Calendar Golden Slam, successfully defended her title by defeating Natasha Zvereva 6–0, 6–0 in a 32-minute final. Natasha, who had eliminated Martina Navratilova in the fourth round, won only thirteen points in the match.

=== Water polo ===
==== Men ====
- 2009 FINA Men's Water Polo World League - South Africa 60 – 0 Libya.

==== Women ====
- In the women's tournament at the 2019 World Aquatics Championships, Hungary defeated South Korea 64–0.

== See also ==
- Running up the score
- Walkover
- Forfeit (sport)
- Cheating in sports
- Doping in sport
- Goal difference
- AS Adema 149–0 SO l'Emyrne
- Brazil 76–0 Timor-Leste
- England 20–0 Latvia
- France v Azerbaijan (UEFA Euro 1996 qualifying)
- Bahrain 10–0 Indonesia
- World record
- List of unbeaten football club seasons
- Perfect season
- List of uncompetitive athletes
