= Thomas Schaffer =

Austrian gridiron football player (born 1996)

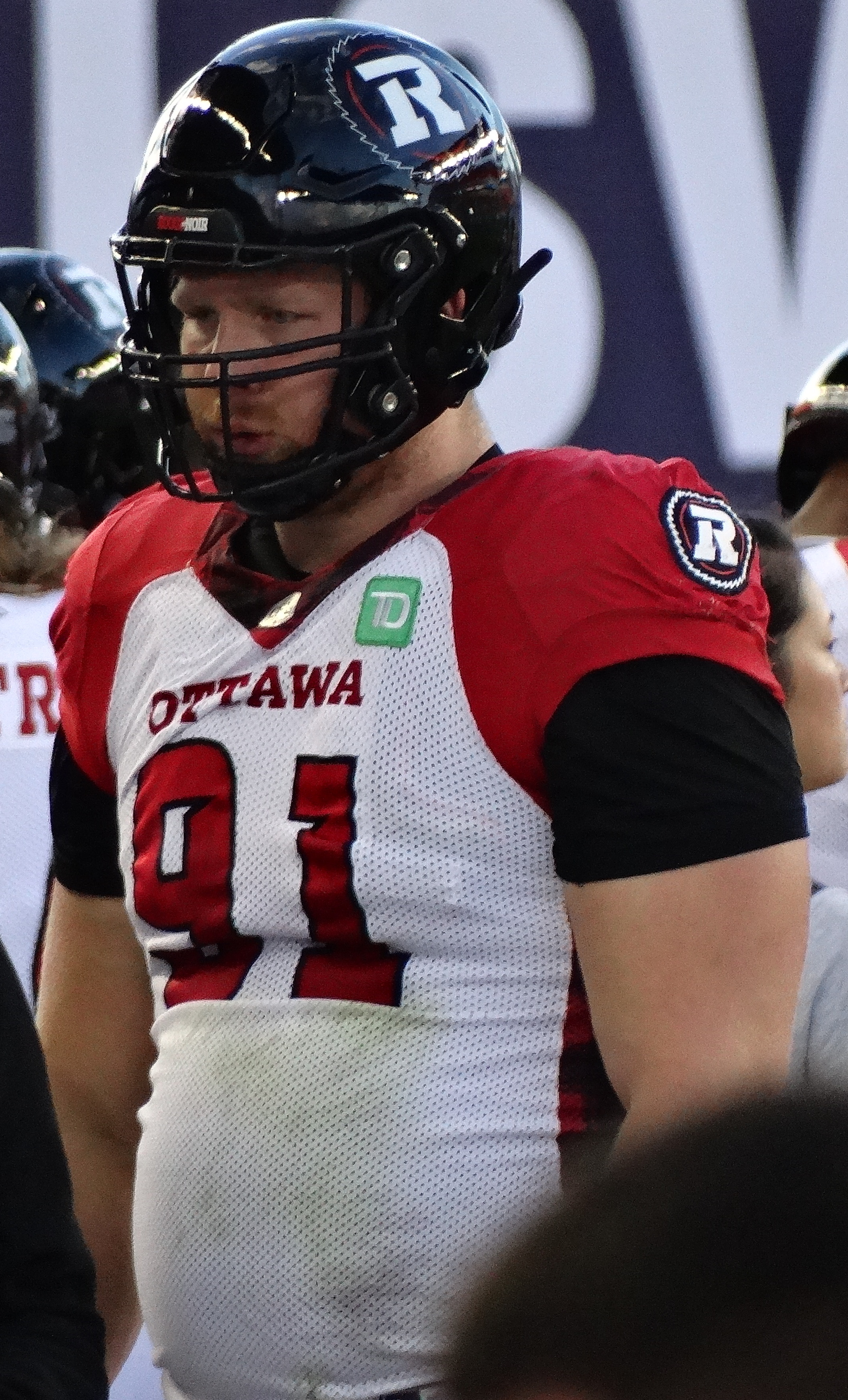
- Schaffer with the Ottawa Redblacks in 2023

No. 91
- Position: Defensive lineman

Personal information
- Born: 23 October 1998 (age 28); Vienna, Austria
- Listed height: 6 ft 7 in (2.01 m)
- Listed weight: 301 lb (137 kg)

Career information
- High school: Lake Forest Academy (IL)
- College: Stanford
- NFL draft: 2021: undrafted

Career history
- 2021: Chicago Bears*
- 2022: Raiders Tirol
- 2023: Vienna Vikings*
- 2023: Ottawa Redblacks
- * Offseason or practice squad member only
- Stats at CFL.ca

Thomas Schaffer (born 23 October 1998) is an Austrian former professional gridiron football player who was a defensive lineman for the Ottawa Redblacks of the Canadian Football League (CFL). He played college football at Stanford. He was also a member of the Chicago Bears of the National Football League (NFL), and the Raiders Tirol and Vienna Vikings of the European League of Football (ELF).

== Early life ==
Schaffer was born in Vienna, Austria and grew up playing American football, soccer, handball, basketball, skiing, and snowboarding. He was part of the Austrian team at the 2012 IFAF U-19 World Championship and was Austria's youngest ever member at 15 years old. He moved to the United States when he was 16 and played high school football at Lake Forest Academy in Lake Forest, Illinois, recording 62 tackles, 4.5 sacks, three pass breakups and two forced fumbles his senior year. Schaffer played volleyball in high school as well. He was also a member of Team Austria at the 2014 IFAF U-19 World Championship and the 2015 U-19 European Championship.

== College career ==
Schaffer played college football at Stanford from 2017 to 2020. He was redshirted in 2016. He was the first Austrian to play FBS football.

Schaffer played in three games in 2017 and recorded one tackle. He appeared in five games in 2018, totaling three tackles and one pass breakup. Schaffer played in 12 games in 2019, accumulating 13 tackles, one sack and one forced fumble. He started all six games of the COVID-19 shortened 2020 season, recording 20 tackles and three sacks, earning honorable mention All-Pac-12 Conference honors.

== Professional career ==
Schaffer signed with the Chicago Bears of the National Football League (NFL) on 14 May 2021. He was released on 21 June 2021.

Schaffer played four games for the Raiders Tirol of the European League of Football (ELF) in 2022, recording nine tackles and a fumble recovery. He signed with the Vienna Vikings for the 2023 season but joined the Ottawa Redblacks of the Canadian Football League (CFL) before ever playing for the Vikings.

Schaffer was signed by the Redblacks on 1 May 2023. He dressed in six games for the Redblacks in 2023, totaling two tackles on defense and one forced fumble. He was released on May 11, 2024.
