= 2011 European Junior Championship of American football =

2011 European Junior Championship
Quarter	1	2	3	4	Tot
France	0	14	0	0	14
Austria	10	0	0	14	24
Dates	August 28 - September 3, 2011
City	Seville, Spain
Stadiums	San Pablo and La Cartuja
- Results
(gold) Winner	Austria
(silver) Runners-up	France
(bronze) 3rd place	Sweden

The 2011 European Junior Championship was the tenth European Junior Championship of American football. It was held from August 28 to September 3, in Sevilla, Spain.

== Qualification ==
A total of 14 teams joined the competition for the 2011 title of Junior European Champion. The number of teams was increased by three since the last qualification for the 2008 championship in Seville.

Three teams had a guaranteed place in the final tournament: Germany and Sweden (the top two teams from the last championship) and Spain (as the host). The remaining three spots were selected in a three-round qualification format. The teams were seeded in the schedule by their rankings.

=== Round one ===
Home team	Result	Away team	Ref
Italy	19–24	Czech Republic	
Netherlands	13–18	(United Kingdom) Great Britain	

=== Round two ===
Switzerland resigned and was replaced by the Netherlands in the tournament.

Home team	Result	Away team	Ref
Serbia	13–11	(United Kingdom) Great Britain	
Netherlands	14–7	Czech Republic	
Serbia	28–15	Netherlands	

=== Round three ===
Home team	Result	Away team	Ref
Austria	w.o.	Russia	
France	35–0	Serbia	
Denmark	20–14	Finland	

=== Qualified teams ===
- Spain (host nation)
- Germany (defending champion)
- Sweden (runner-up)
- France (won Serbia 35–0)
- Denmark (won Finland 20–14)
- Austria (won Russia by w.o.)

== Matches ==
=== Group A ===
Team	Played	Won	Lost	Points for	Points against
Austria	2	2	0	35	23
Germany	2	1	1	19	21
Denmark	2	0	2	23	33

Quarter	1	2	3	4	Total
Austria	7	0	7	0	14
Germany	0	7	0	0	7

at La Cartuja

- Date: August 28, 2011
- Game time: 10:30
- Game weather: cloudy
- Referee: Rasmussen
- Box score

Quarter	1	2	3	4	Total
Denmark	3	0	7	6	16
Austria	0	21	0	0	21

at San Pablo Stadium

- Date: August 30, 2011
- Game time: 10:30
- Game weather: sunny
- Game attendance: 185
- Referee: Connor
- Box score

Quarter	1	2	3	4	Total
Germany	0	0	0	12	12
Denmark	7	0	0	0	7

at La Cartuja

- Date: September 1, 2011
- Game time: 10:30
- Game weather: cloudy
- Game attendance: 367
- Referee: Lamminsalo
- Box score

=== Group B ===
Team	Played	Won	Lost	Points for	Points against
France	2	2	0	76	20
Sweden	2	1	1	42	31
Spain	2	0	2	16	83

Quarter	1	2	3	4	Total
Spain	0	10	0	0	10
Sweden	6	0	8	14	28

at La Cartuja

- Date: August 28, 2011
- Game time: 18:00
- Box score

Quarter	1	2	3	4	Total
France	20	21	7	7	55
Spain	0	0	0	6	6

at San Pablo Stadium

- Date: August 30, 2011
- Game time: 18:00
- Game weather: sunny
- Game attendance: 436
- Referee: Lamminsalo
- Box score

Quarter	1	2	3	4	Total
Sweden	0	0	8	6	14
France	7	0	0	14	21

at La Cartuja

- Date: September 1, 2011
- Game time: 18:00
- Box score

=== 5th place ===
Quarter	1	2	3	4	Total
Spain	3	0	0	0	3
Denmark	0	20	14	7	41

at San Pablo Stadium

- Date: Sep 03, 2011
- Game time: 09:30
- Box score

=== 3rd place ===
Quarter	1	2	3	4	Total
Sweden	9	12	0	0	21
Germany	0	7	0	7	14

at San Pablo Stadium

- Date: Sep 03, 2011
- Game time: 12:45
- Game weather: partly cloudy
- Game attendance: 194
- Referee: Lamminsalo
- Box score

=== Final ===
Quarter	1	2	3	4	Total
Austria	10	0	0	14	24
France	0	14	0	0	14

at La Cartuja

- Date: Sep 03, 2011
- Game time: 18:00
- Game weather: partly cloudy
- Game attendance: 383
- Referee: Connor
- Box score

== See also ==
- 2011 in sports
