= Lucky Ogbevoen =

Austrian-American football player (born 2000)

No. 43 – Vienna Vikings
- Position: Linebacker
- Roster status: Practice roster
- CFL status: Global

Personal information
- Born: July 20, 2000 (age 26); Vienna, Austria
- Listed height: 6 ft 2 in (1.88 m)
- Listed weight: 223 lb (101 kg)

Career information
- NFL draft: 2024: undrafted
- CFL draft: 2024G: 2nd round, 17th overall pick

Career history
- Vienna Vikings (2021); Stuttgart Surge (2021); Raiders Tirol (2022–2023); Cologne Centurions (2024)*; Winnipeg Blue Bombers (2024); Vienna Vikings (2025–present)
- * Offseason or practice squad member only

Awards and highlights
- Austrian U17 Champion (2015, 2016); Junior European Champion (2017, 2019)

Career ELF statistics
- Games played: 25
- Tackles: 175
- Tackles for loss: 18.5
- Sacks: 3.5
- Interceptions: 1
- Stats at CFL.ca

Lucky Efosa Ogbevoen (born July 20, 2000) is an Austrian gridiron football linebacker for the Vienna Vikings of the European League of Football (ELF).

== Career ==
Ogbevoen started playing American football in 2012 at the Vienna Vikings Football Academy. In 2015 and 2016, Ogbevoen became Austrian U17 champion with the Vikings. In 2016, he was named team MVP. In November 2016, he was also part of the Austrian U17 national team that beat the Hungarian U18 national team at the Next Generation Bowl. With the Austrian U19 national team he became junior European champion in Paris in 2017 and in 2019.

During the 2018 AFL season, Ogbevoen made his debut in the Vikings' first team. In ten games he recorded 13 solo and seven assisted tackles. The following year he developed into a regular player and at the end of the season led the Vikings team with 32 solo and 33 assisted tackles. After failing in his attempt to be recruited by a college in the USA in 2020, he played again for the Vikings in the AFL in 2021. He also made his debut for the Austrian national team in August. After the conclusion of the AFL season, Ogbevoen was signed by the Stuttgart Surge of the European League of Football (ELF). He played in one game for the Swabian team.

For the 2022 season, Ogbevoen signed with the Raiders Tirol, who competed as a franchise in the ELF for the first time in 2022. He served as a regular at the weakside linebacker position. With the Raiders he reached the semi-finals, but lost to the Hamburg Sea Devils. A week later, he was named defensive MVP at the Raiders' final night. In addition, Ogbevoen was invited by the National Football League to the 2022 NFL International Combine in London. In the fall, he took part in the group stage of the 2023 European Championship for Austria. On March 2, 2023, the Raiders announced the extension with Ogbevoen for another ELF season.

In Dezember 2023, Ogbevoen initially moved to the Cologne Centurions. Before the start of the 2024 ELF season, however, he was selected in the second round of the Canadian Football League Global Draft by the Winnipeg Blue Bombers. He was released from the team on May 2, 2025.

On May 12, 2025, Ogbeveon signed back with the Vienna Vikings.

== Statistics ==
Regular season
Year	Team	Games	Starts	Tackles					Pass defenses					Fumbles		
Year	Team	Games	Starts	Total	Solo	Ast	TFL	Sack	INT	Yds	TD	BrUp	PD	FF	FR	TD
European League of Football
2021	Stuttgart Surge	1	1	9	5	4	0.5	0.0	0	0	0	0	0	0	0	0
2022	Raiders Tirol	12	12	79	41	38	10.0	1.5	1	1	0	2	3	1	1	0
2023	Raiders Tirol	11	12	87	40	47	8.0	2.0	0	0	0	5		0	2	0
2025	Vienna Vikings	0	8	42	19	23	6.0	6.5	0	0	0	2		2	0	0
ELF total		24	33	217	105	112	18.5	3.5	1	1	0	9	3	3	3	0
Source: sportsmetrics.football

Postseason
Year	Team	Games	Starts	Tackles					Pass defenses					Fumbles		
Year	Team	Games	Starts	Total	Solo	Ast	TFL	Sack	INT	Yds	TD	BrUp	PD	FF	FR	TD
European League of Football
2022	Raiders Tirol	1	1	9	2	7	1.5	1.0	0	0	0	0	0	0	0	0
ELF total		1	1	9	2	7	1.5	1.0	0	0	0	0	0	0	0	0
Source: europeanleague.football

== Personal life ==
His older brother, Precious Ogbevoen is also active in American football. Ogbevoen studies at the University of Innsbruck.
