= 2000 Borregos Salvajes CEM football team =

Mexican college American football season

2000 Borregos Salvajes CEM football

ONEFA national champion

Conferencia 10 Grandes championship game, W 38–28 vs. Borregos Salvajes Monterrey
- Conference: Conferencia 10 Grandes
- Record: 11–0 (9–0 10 Grandes)
- Head coach: Rafael Duk (7th season)
- Home stadium: Corral de Plástico

2000 Conferencia 10 Grandes standings
	Conf.			Overall
Team	W		L	W		L
Borregos Salvajes CEM y$^	9	–	0	11	–	0
Borregos Salvajes MTY y^	7	–	2	8	–	3
Aztecas UDLAP ^	7	–	2	7	–	3
Auténticos Tigres UANL ^	4	–	5	4	–	6
Pumas CU	4	–	5	4	–	5
Pumas Acatlán	4	–	5	4	–	5
Borregos Salvajes TOL	4	–	5	4	–	5
Borregos Salvajes Laguna	3	–	6	3	–	6
Águilas Blancas IPN	3	–	6	3	–	6
Lobos UAdeC	0	–	9	0	–	9
Championship: Borregos Salvajes CEM 38, Borregos Salvajes Monterrey 28
$ – Conference champion; y – Championship game participant; ^ – Playoff participant

The 2000 Borregos Salvajes CEM football team represented the Instituto Tecnológico de Estudios Superiores Monterrey, Campus Estado de México (ITESM CEM or Tec CEM) in the 2000 ONEFA Liga Mayor season. The team competed in the top-tier Conferencia 10 Grandes and played its home games at the Corral de Plástico in Ciudad López Mateos.

In their seventh year under head coach Rafael Duk, (Note: Duk served as head coach from 1994 to 2001.) the Borregos Salvajes compiled a perfect 11–0 record (9–0 in conference games), outscored opponents by a total of 485 to 181, and won the ONEFA Liga Mayor national championship by defeating the Borregos Salvajes Monterrey in the Conferencia 10 Grandes championship game. They overcame a 21-point halftime deficit by scoring 31 unanswered points to capture the first national championship in program history, which also prevented a three-peat by Monterrey.

The Borregos Salvajes led the Conferencia 10 Grandes in total offense, tallying 3,860 yards during the regular season. They also had the second-best defense in the conference (after the Borregos Salvajes Monterrey), allowing just 447 total rushing yards over nine regular season games. The team was led on offense by quarterback Alfredo "El Pillo" Flores and running back Juan Carlos Ayala; the latter led the conference in scoring while kicker Omar Anselmo Cárdenas ranked third. Also on the roster was future NFL practice squad member and NFL Europe player Mauricio "Tyson" López. Additionally, the coaching staff included future Fundidores de Monterrey head coach Carlos Strevel.

== Background ==
The Borregos Salvajes CEM won the second-tier Conferencia Nacional championship in 1996 to earn promotion to the top-tier Conferencia 10 Grandes, where they placed third in three consecutive seasons from 1997 to 1999. The team entered the 2000 season trying to build upon a 7–3 record from the previous year, when they boasted the best defense in the conference.

The Borregos Salvajes started offseason practices in January. An official presentation of the team was held on 26 August in Tlalnepantla with more than 400 people in attendance. The Borregos Salvajes began the season with an 83-man roster.

== Schedule ==
Date	Time	Opponent	Site	Result	Attendance	Source
2 September	3:00 p.m.	at Lobos UAdeC	Estadio Jorge Castro; Saltillo	W 34–6		
9 September	12:00 p.m.	Pumas CU	Corral de Plástico; Ciudad López Mateos	W 45–3		
16 September	12:00 p.m.	Aztecas UDLAP	Corral de Plástico; Ciudad López Mateos	W 38–13		
23 September	12:00 p.m.	at Águilas Blancas IPN	Estadio Wilfrido Massieu; Mexico City	W 33–20		
29 September	4:00 p.m.	at Pumas Acatlán	Estadio Perros Negros; Naucalpan	W 37–10		
7 October	12:00 p.m.	Borregos Salvajes Laguna	Corral de Plástico; Ciudad López Mateos	W 35–16		
14 October	12:00 p.m.	Borregos Salvajes Toluca	Corral de Plástico; Ciudad López Mateos	W 79–0		
20 October	7:00 p.m.	at Auténticos Tigres UANL	Estadio Gaspar Mass; San Nicolás de los Garza	W 58–40		
28 October	12:00 p.m.	Borregos Salvajes Monterrey	Corral de Plástico; Ciudad López Mateos	W 43–37	10,000	
4 November	12:00 p.m.	Auténticos Tigres UANL	Corral de Plástico; Ciudad López Mateos (ONEFA 10 Grandes semifinal)	W 45–8	6,000	
11 November	12:00 p.m.	Borregos Salvajes Monterrey	Corral de Plástico; Ciudad López Mateos (ONEFA 10 Grandes championship game)	W 38–28	14,000–15,000	
