= 2024 IFAF World Junior Championship =

American football season

IFAF World Junior Football Championship

Tournament details
- Host nation: Canada
- Dates: June 20 – June 30
- No. of nations: Eight teams

Final positions
- Champions: Canada
- Runner-up: Japan
- Third-place: Austria

Tournament statistics
- Attendance: 17,000 est.
- MVP of the tournament: Offence: Michael Sazbo, QB, Austria Defence: Benjamin Blaise, DB/LB, Canada

The 2024 IFAF World Junior Championship was an international American football tournament for junior teams (20 years and under). The competition was co-hosted by Football Canada and Football Alberta in Edmonton, Alberta in June 2024. Although Football Canada had won the most IFAF World Junior Championships with three prior to the tournament, the country has not hosted the event since it started in 2009.

Nine nations qualified for the tournament:

- Canada - host and defending champion
- Mexico - silver medallist from the 2018 championship
- United States - bronze medallist from the 2018 championship
- Austria - European U-19 champions from 2023 European Junior Championship of American football
- Sweden - European U-19 runner-up
- Japan - Asia representative
- Australia - Oceania representative
- Brazil - South America representative
- Panama - Central America representative

Canada, United States, Japan, Austria, Australia, Panama, Brazil and a "B team" from Canada (Canada II) participated in this competition.

== Seeding ==
- 1. Canada
- 2. United States
- 3. Japan
- 4. Austria
- 5. Canada II
- 6. Australia
- 7. Panama
- 8. Brazil

== Games ==
=== Quarterfinal ===
Game 1

| Quarter | 1 | 2 | 3 | 4 | Total |
|---|---|---|---|---|---|
| Canada 2 | 0 | 7 | 0 | 6 | 13 |
| Austria | 10 | 10 | 7 | 14 | 41 |

at Clarke Stadium

- Date: June 22, 2024
- Game time: 1100 MT
- Game weather: 24c, sunny
- Game attendance: 1,415
- Referee: Scott Hood
- TV: https://ifaf.tv/sportitem/665afd00bf70fa98845f3395

Game 2

| Quarter | 1 | 2 | 3 | 4 | Total |
|---|---|---|---|---|---|
| United States | 28 | 23 | 14 | 21 | 86 |
| Panama | 0 | 0 | 6 | 6 | 12 |

at Commonwealth Stadium

- Date: June 22, 2024
- Game time: 1200 MT
- Game weather: 24c, sunny
- Game attendance: 800
- Referee: Mats Schwieger
- TV: https://ifaf.tv/sportitem/665afd777377385b457ad312

Game 3

| Quarter | 1 | 2 | 3 | 4 | Total |
|---|---|---|---|---|---|
| Australia | 0 | 0 | 6 | 0 | 6 |
| Japan | 14 | 9 | 20 | 7 | 50 |

at Clarke Stadium

- Date: June 22, 2024
- Game time: 1600 MT
- Game weather: 21c Sunny
- Game attendance: 1,011
- Referee: Veikko Lamminsalo
- TV: https://ifaf.tv/sportitem/665afd787377385b457ad326

Game 4

| Quarter | 1 | 2 | 3 | 4 | Total |
|---|---|---|---|---|---|
| Brazil | 0 | 0 | 0 | 0 | 0 |
| Canada | 28 | 27 | 21 | 34 | 110 |

at Commonwealth Stadium

- Date: June 22, 2024
- Game time: 1700 MT
- Game weather: 20c, sunny
- Game attendance: 1,200
- Referee: Matthias Kaltenegger
- TV: https://ifaf.tv/sportitem/665afd79bf70fa98845f34a9

=== Semifinal ===
Game 5

| Quarter | 1 | 2 | 3 | 4 | Total |
|---|---|---|---|---|---|
| Panama | 0 | 0 | 0 | 0 | 0 |
| Australia | 0 | 7 | 0 | 14 | 21 |

at Clarke Stadium

- Date: June 26, 2024
- Game time: 1100 MT
- Game weather: 24c, sunny
- Game attendance: 1,008
- Referee: Matthias Kaltenegger
- TV: https://ifaf.tv/sportitem/665afe97bf70fa98845f3679

Game 6 - semifinal

| Quarter | 1 | 2 | 3 | 4 | Total |
|---|---|---|---|---|---|
| Japan | 20 | 7 | 7 | 7 | 41 |
| United States | 0 | 7 | 6 | 7 | 20 |

at Commonwealth Stadium

- Date: June 22, 2024
- Game time: 1200 MT
- Game weather: 24c, sunny
- Game attendance: 1,208
- Referee: Veikko Lamminsalo
- TV: https://ifaf.tv/sportitem/665afefebf70fa98845f36b4

Game 7

| Quarter | 1 | 2 | 3 | 4 | Total |
|---|---|---|---|---|---|
| Brazil | 0 | 7 | 0 | 0 | 7 |
| Canada 2 | 21 | 14 | 14 | 14 | 63 |

at Clarke Stadium

- Date: June 26, 2024
- Game time: 1600 MT
- Game weather: 21c sunny
- Game attendance: 900
- Referee: Mats Schwieger
- TV: https://ifaf.tv/sportitem/665aff46bf70fa98845f36df

Game 8 - semifinal

| Quarter | 1 | 2 | 3 | 4 | Total |
|---|---|---|---|---|---|
| Austria | 14 | 3 | 0 | 3 | 20 |
| Canada | 7 | 3 | 14 | 3 | 27 |

at Commonwealth Stadium

- Date: June 26, 2024
- Game time: 1700 MT
- Game weather: 20c, sunny
- Game attendance: 2,012
- Referee: Scott Hood
- TV: https://ifaf.tv/sportitem/665aff9abf70fa98845f370b

=== Placement and medal games ===
Game 9 - seventh place/South American title

| Quarter | 1 | 2 | 3 | 4 | Total |
|---|---|---|---|---|---|
| Brazil | 0 | 7 | 7 | 0 | 14 |
| Panama | 0 | 14 | 7 | 29 | 50 |

at Clarke Stadium

- Date: June 30, 2024
- Game time: 1100 MT
- Game weather: 24c, sunny
- Game attendance: 350
- Referee: Scott Hood
- TV: https://ifaf.tv/sportitem/665b00217377385b457ad72c

Game 10 - bronze medal game

| Quarter | 1 | 2 | 3 | 4 | Total |
|---|---|---|---|---|---|
| Austria | 14 | 8 | 2 | 8 | 32 |
| United States | 8 | 3 | 0 | 14 | 25 |

at Commonwealth Stadium

- Date: June 30, 2024
- Game time: 1200 MT
- Game weather: 20c, Partly cloudy
- Game attendance: 2,234
- Referee: Mats Schwieger
- TV: https://ifaf.tv/sportitem/665b01e77377385b457ad873

Game 11 - fifth place game

| Quarter | 1 | 2 | 3 | 4 | Total |
|---|---|---|---|---|---|
| Australia | 0 | 7 | 0 | 0 | 7 |
| Canada 2 | 0 | 17 | 21 | 7 | 45 |

at Clarke Stadium

- Date: June 30, 2024
- Game time: 1600 MT
- Game weather: 18c overcast, windy
- Game attendance: 600
- Referee: Matthias Kaltenegger
- TV: https://ifaf.tv/sportitem/665b02db8b0a27fc73e9f86a

Game 12 - gold medal game

| Quarter | 1 | 2 | 3 | 4 | Total |
|---|---|---|---|---|---|
| Japan | 3 | 0 | 0 | 6 | 9 |
| Canada | 0 | 7 | 3 | 10 | 20 |

at Commonwealth Stadium

- Date: June 30, 2024
- Game time: 1700 MT
- Game weather: 16c, windy, rain
- Game attendance: 3,489
- Referee: Veikko Lamminsalo (Finland); Travis Jerkovits (Canada); James Cowtun (Canada); Chiara Tomaz (Italy); Kim Larsen (Denmark); Jake Webb (Canada); Julia Long (Canada)
- TV: https://ifaf.tv/sportitem/665b024abf70fa98845f3ce1

== Final placement ==
- 1. Canada
- 2. Japan
- 3. Austria
- 4. United States
- 5. Canada II
- 6. Australia
- 7. Panama
- 8. Brazil

== Headlines ==
- The gold medal final was the first IFAF game broadcast on a North American sports network, TSN in Canada.
- The 110 points scored by Canada against Brazil was the most ever in an IFAF international American Football game, and the largest margin of victory.
- Canada is the first nation to win three world junior championships in a row.
- Canada becomes the only nation to medal in every world junior championship.
- This event was the first time the United States has not medalled at an IFAF event they have participated in.
- Austria is the first European team to win a medal at this event.
