= Instituto Tecnológico de Estudios Superiores de Monterrey (Campus Estado de México) =

Coordinates: 19.5959°N 99.2291°W

“Instituto Tecnológico de Estudios Superiores Monterrey, Campus Estado de Mexico (known also as Tec CEM) is a campus of the “Instituto Tecnológico y de Estudios Superiores Monterrey”. It is located in the Atizapán de Zaragoza Municipality, in Mexico State. With over 10,000 students between high school, college, and postgraduate studies, it is the second biggest campus in the ITESM system (behind Campus Monterrey - 20,000 students).

== History ==
It was founded in 1976, as the “Unidad Estado de México” and it started with just 328 students (276 from high school and 52 from college).

The founding project was commanded by the doctor César Morales Hernández, and financed by the "Asociación de Enseñanza Tecnológica del Estado de México, A.C." and the initial installations were just two buildings.

The campus is considered to be one of the most important in the ITESM system, in both academic, sporting and cultural aspects.

== University presidents ==
In its 30 years of history, the campus had counted with seven General Directors:

- Dr. César Morales
- Dr. Raymundo Aguirre
- Dr. Fernando Sánchez Lara
- Dr. Jorge Ángel Díaz López
- Ing. Emilio Alvarado Badillo
- Dr. Jesús Eugenio García Gardea
- Dr. Pedro Luis Grasa Soler

== National and international awards ==
The campus is distinguished since the beginning by offering a better education quality to their students, also to multiply the services that they offer through a social service that students perform. Both efforts had been recognized by national and international institutions. Between the most prominent rewards they are:

=== Quality rewards ===
- 1998 National Quality Award: It is the maximum recognition that the Mexican government gives to organizations that work for their everyday improvement. The Campus Estado de México was the first Mexican University to obtain this reward.
- 2003 Iberoamerican Quality Award: The Award distinguishes between various Latin-American organizations and it is given in the Ibero-American of Estate chiefs and Government Peek. Until the moment it has been the only Ibero-American University to obtain the reward.
- 2004 Asian Pacific quality Award: This prize is given to organizations that belong to the countries of the APEC. The campus competed with institutions and companies from different countries, such as Japan, United States, China, and Australia. It has been the only Asian-Pacific University to obtain the reward.

=== Socially Responsible Enterprise ===
The Mexican government, through the Social Development Ministry recognizes that those businesses with a distinguished by extending to its community bigger benefits. The campus has obtained the recognition in the years 2004, 2005, 2006, and 2007.

=== Other rewards ===
The campus has also obtained the “Cumplimiento Ambiental” reward, thanks to the work that has developed the physical floor direction. It also counts the National Reward in Saving Energy in the Education sector.

== Academy ==
The Tecnológico de Monterrey, Campus Estado de México has the following academic programs:

=== High school ===
Three educational programs:

- Tec's Bilingual High school.
- Tec's Multicultural High school.
- Tec's International High school.

=== College ===
It has twenty-three programs (degrees).

- Electrical Engineering
- Mechanical Engineering
- Mechatronics Engineering
- Automotive Design Engineering
- Industrial Engineering and Systems Management
- Chemical Management Engineering
- Biotechnology Engineering
- Engineering in Digital Systems and Robotics
- Engineering in Electronic Technologies
- Architecture
- Industrial Design
- Communication and Digital Media
- Public Accounting and Finances
- Economy and Finances
- Financial Management

It is important to know that they also count with international programs.

=== Graduate studies ===
Eleven subjects and two doctor's degree.

== Cultural activities ==
The campus has one of the most active cultural lives in the ITESM system. The cultural program includes the premiere of at least two plays from the theater company of the campus per year.

This campus has the biggest art collection in the ITESM system, which includes principally pictorial art and sculptures, located in several of its locations. Also, the campus is host of borrowed collections from other institutes, such as the Cow Parade from Campus Ciudad de México.

The campus is also, headquarter of multiple concerts of recognized bands and singers, such as: Eugenia León, Café Tacuba, Moderato, etc.

== Sports ==
The campus counts with the following sports facilities:

- American football and soccer stadiums with capacity for 15,000 persons with synthetic grass. (It was the first stadium in Mexico with synthetic grass.)
- Tennis stadium.
- Tennis, basketball and volleyball courts.
- Track team (National Champions in 1989, CONADEIP-1989).
- Olympic pool.
- Three specialized gymnasiums.
- Gymnasium with capacity for 1,500 people and hardwood court.
- Climbing wall.

The campus directive office has placed significant emphasis on integrating sports into the daily lives of the students. As a result, the university is renowned for its achievements across a broad range of sporting disciplines.

== Olympic medalists ==
Between its students and ex-students, four are well-known:

- Fernando Platas, silver Olympic medalist in diving during the Sydney 2000 Summer Olympics.
- Juan Ignacio Reyes, Paralympics’ multi-golden medalist in swimming during Sydney 2000 Summer Olympics.
- Alejandro Cárdenas, Olympic runner of 400m plans.
- Joel Sánchez Guerrero, bronze Olympic medalist in 25 km march in Sydney 2000 Summer Olympics.

== Borregos CEM ==
By default, the most popular sport in the institution is American football, in which the first team is most well known from all the others in the national league, winning the ONEFA championship (the greatest league of football) during 2000 and 2003. Its cheerleading animal is a lamb, which is why the whole campus is better known by Borregos Salvajes - CEM.
