= NFL Global Junior Championship =

American football competition

- Sport: American football
- Founded: 1997
- No. of teams: 5 in 2007
- Most recent champion(s): Canada (4th title)
- Official website: Global Football

The NFL Global Junior Championship was played during the week leading up to the Super Bowl, in the same city that is hosting the game. The first game was played in 1997, and only two teams played, Mexico and Europe. Mexico won the first and second edition, Europe won the third edition. From 2000 to 2002 four teams participated and from 2003 to 2006 five teams. The competition ended in 2007 being replaced by the IFAF Junior World Cup.

== Results ==
=== Summaries ===
| Year | Edition | Champion | Score | Runner-up | Third place | Venue | MVP |
|---|---|---|---|---|---|---|---|
| 1997 | I | Mexico | 30–6 | (European Union) Europe | none | New Orleans, LA | (European Union) Constantin Ritzmann, DE |
| 1998 | II | Mexico | 13–12 | (European Union) Europe | none | Chula Vista, CA | (European Union) Constantin Ritzmann, DE |
| 1999 | III | (European Union) Europe | 29–8 | Mexico | none | Fort Lauderdale, FL | (European Union) Constantin Ritzmann, DE |
| 2000 | IV | Canada | 7–6 | (European Union) Europe | United States | Atlanta, GA | (Canada) Nick Wishart, RB |
| 2001 | V | United States | 21–19 | Canada | Japan | Clearwater, FL | (United States) Jay Davis, QB |
| 2002 | VI | United States | 16–14 | Canada | (European Union) Europe | New Orleans, LA | (United States) Jason Spadoni, RB |
| 2003 | VII | United States | 28–21 (OT) | Canada | Mexico | San Diego, CA | (United States) JC Cooper, LB |
| 2004 | VIII | United States | 31–0 | Canada | Mexico | Houston, TX | (United States) Brian Johnson, QB |
| 2005 | IX | Canada | 38–35 | United States | Mexico | Jacksonville, FL | (Canada) Jerome Messam, RB |
| 2006 | X | Canada | 10–0 | United States | Japan | Pontiac, MI | (Canada) Samuel Fournier, RB |
| 2007 | XI | Canada | 23–13 | United States | Mexico | Fort Lauderdale, FL | (Canada) Ameet Pall, DE |

Results of the NFL Global Junior Championship 1997 – 2007

=== Most championships ===
| Team | Championships |
|---|---|
| United States | 4 |
| Canada | 4 |
| Mexico | 2 |
| (European Union) Europe | 1 |
