= Canada national junior football team =

Canada U20 Football Team
- Full name: Football Canada World Junior Team
- Nicknames: True North
- Short name: Team Canada/Equipe Canada
- Sport: American Football/Canadian Football
- Founded: U20 team: 2000
- League: IFAF
- Division: IFAF Americas
- Location: Ottawa, Ontario
- Colours
- Anthem: O Canada; Fight song: The Maple Leaf Forever
- Owner: Non-profit
- President: (Canada) Jim Mullin
- Managing director: (Canada) Kevin McDonald
- Head coach: (Canada) Warren Craney
- Manager: (Canada) Jamie Geisler
- Overall record: NFL Global Junior Championship: 22-4, IFAF Junior World Championship: 17-3, Overall: 39-7
- Championships: NFL Global Junior Championship: 2000, 2005, 2006, 2007, IFAF Junior World Championship: 2012, 2016, 2018, 2024
- Broadcasters: IFAF.tv, TSN
- Website: footballcanada.com

Canada national junior football team
Medal record

Men's American football

Representing Canada

NFL Global Junior Championship
Gold medal – first place	2000 United States	Team
Silver medal – second place	2001 United States	Team
Silver medal – second place	2002 United States	Team
Silver medal – second place	2003 United States	Team
Silver medal – second place	2004 United States	Team
Gold medal – first place	2005 United States	Team
Gold medal – first place	2006 United States	Team
Gold medal – first place	2007 United States	Team

World Championship
Silver medal – second place	2009 United States	Team
Gold medal – first place	2012 United States	Team
Silver medal – second place	2014 Kuwait	Team
Gold medal – first place	2016 China	Team
Gold medal – first place	2018 Mexico	Team
Gold medal – first place	2024 Canada	Team

The Canada national football junior team a.k.a. the Football Canada World Junior Team represent Canada in international gridiron football competitions. The football program is part of the football development program and is controlled by Football Canada and is recognized by the International Federation of American Football (IFAF). It is the premiere team in male development for the organization. While Football Canada is the governing body for amateur Canadian football, IFAF-sponsored games are played using American football rules. Team Canada first competed on the world stage in the NFL Global Junior Championship in 2000 with a championship victory over Team Europe. They competed for their first IFAF Junior World Championship in 2009.

Canada developed the Football Canada World Junior Team as an elite program which participated in IFAF Under-19 World Championship which was held every two years from 2012 until 2020.

The IFAF U20 World Junior Championship replaced the U19 format and was staged in June 2024 in Edmonton, Canada. With the 2020 championship cancelled due to COVID-19, there were efforts to restage that event in 2021 as a U20 aged event in Vancouver, but was still subject to pandemic cancellations.

== History ==
Football Canada became a full member of the IFAF in 2004. Thereafter Canada competed in international junior, flag, and women's football events.

Team Canada is the most successful team at the IFAF World Junior Championships, with four gold and two silver medals. Canada is the only national team to win three consecutive championships in 2016 in Harbin, China over the United States, followed up with a 2018 win over the Mexico, and a 2024 win over Japan.

The roster of the Canada national football junior team is players aged 20 and under and are typically from U SPORTS, Canadian Junior Football League (CJFL), Quebec-based CEGEP schools, high school or community football programs. The head coach for the program is selected by Football Canada and appointed prior to selecting the remainder of the tournaments coaching staff or players. Warren Craney was appointed head coach of the 2024 team, reprising his role from 2016. Craney is the most decorated coach in IFAF football with two gold medals as a head coach (2016, 2024), one gold as an offensive coordinator in 2012, and two slivers (2009, 2014). In the 2024 World Junior Championship, Canada "B" Team named Canada II, coached by former McGill Redbirds head coach Ronald Hilaire, finished at the fifth place.

== IFAF World Junior Championship Games ==
WC	Winner		Loser		Game	Date and location
2009	Canada	55	New Zealand	0	Quarterfinal	June 27, 2009 at Canton, Ohio
2009	Canada	38	Japan	35	Semifinal	July 1, 2009 at Canton, Ohio
2009	United States	41	Canada	3	Final	July 4, 2009 at Canton, Ohio
2012	Canada	43	Sweden	0	Quarterfinal	June 30, 2012 at Austin, Texas
2012	Canada	33	Japan	24	Semifinal	July 4, 2012 at Austin, Texas
2012	Canada	23	USA	17	Final	July 7, 2012 at Austin, Texas
2014	Canada	91	Kuwait	0	Pool game	July 7, 2014 at Kuwait City
2014	Canada	56	France	0	Pool game	July 10, 2014 at Kuwait City
2014	Canada	36	Austria	7	Pool game	July 13, 2014 at Kuwait City
2014	United States	40	Canada	17	Final	July 16, 2014 at Kuwait City
2016	Canada	30	Mexico	16	Pool game	June 30, 2016 at Harbin, China
2016	United States	32	Canada	14	Pool game	July 3, 2016 at Harbin, China
2016	Canada	28	Mexico	21	Semifinal	July 7, 2016 at Harbin, China
2016	Canada (2)	24	United States	6	Final	July 10, 2016 at Harbin, China
2018	Canada	60	Sweden	0	Quarterfinal	July 15, 2018 at Mexico City
2018	Canada	28	Japan	22	Semifinal	July 18, 2018 at Mexico City
2018	Canada (3)	13	Mexico	7	Final	July 21, 2018 at Mexico City
2024	Canada	110	Brazil	0	Quarterfinal	June 22, 2024 at Edmonton, Alberta
2024	Canada	27	Austria	20	Semifinal	June 26, 2024 at Edmonton, Alberta
2024	Canada (4)	20	Japan	9	Final	June 30, 2024 at Edmonton, Alberta
