= European Junior Championship of American football =

Biennial American football tournament

European Junior Championship
- Sport: American football
- First season: 1992
- No. of teams: 11
- Most recent champion: Austria (7th title)
- Most titles: Austria (7 titles)

The European Junior Championship is an American football tournament contested by the national teams of European nations. It was founded in 1992 and is held every two years.

== Results ==
Year	Host	Final			Third place match		
Year	Host	Winner	Score	Runner-up	3rd place	Score	4th place
1992	France	Finland	16–7	France	Italy	40–0	Great Britain
1994	Germany	Finland	37–16	Germany	Sweden	30–0	France
1996	Germany	Finland	24–7	Sweden	Germany	41–14	Spain
1998	Germany	Germany	26–8	France	Finland	34–6	Russia
2000	Germany	Germany	19–0	Russia	Austria	10–0	Finland
2002	(United Kingdom); Great Britain	Russia	26–20	Germany	Austria	30–21	France
2004	Russia	France	17–14	Germany	Austria	29–7	Russia
2006	Sweden	France	28–21	Germany	Austria	42–13	Sweden
2008; Details	Spain	Germany	9–6	Sweden	France	28–14	Denmark
2011; Details	Spain	Austria	24–14	France	Sweden	21–14	Germany
2013	Germany	Austria	21–12	France	Germany	48–18	Denmark
2015	Germany	Austria	30–22	Germany	Denmark	14–0	France
2017; Details	France	Austria	17–7	France	Germany	50–0	Italy
2019	(Italy); Bologna	Austria	28–0	Sweden	France	42–15	Denmark
2022	(Austria); Vienna	Austria	13–10	Sweden	Denmark	3–0	France
2023	(Europe)	Austria	42–24	Sweden	Finland	28–22	Denmark
2025	(Europe)				Finland		

== See also ==
- IFAF Europe
