= 2017 European Junior Championship of American football =

Tournament details
- Host nation: France
- Dates: July 14, 2017 – July 16, 2017

Final positions
- Champions: Austria
- Runner-up: France
- Third-place: Germany

The 2017 European Junior Championship was the 13th European Junior Championship. It was held from July 14 to 16 in Paris.

== Qualification ==
A total of eight teams reported to enter for qualification. Therefore, two four-nation tournaments were scheduled, with the winners of these tournaments earning a spot for the final tournament in Paris. Germany, the Netherlands, Spain, and Switzerland were grouped together while the other tournament was planned with Serbia, Italy, Russia and Hungary. As a consequence of the conflict of two organisations, both claiming to be the real IFAF, some weeks before the start of the qualification, a second European Junior Championship was announced to be held in Denmark. Russia and Hungary thus withdrew their participation in the Serbian qualification tournament.

=== Tournament in Serbia ===
Russia and Hungary withdrew. Italy qualified by a victory over host Serbia.

Date	Home team	Result	Away team	Ref
	Serbia	6–7	Italy	

=== Tournament in the Netherlands ===
All matches were played in Almere. Germany won both games with a shutout and thus qualified for the final tournament in Paris.

Date	Home team	Result	Away team	Ref
2 June 2017	Germany	51–0	Switzerland	
2 June 2017	Netherlands	6–14	Spain	
3rd place game
4 June 2017	Netherlands	20–21	Switzerland	
Final
4 June 2017	Germany	43–0	Spain	

== Final tournament ==
=== Qualified teams ===
- France (host nation)
- Austria (defending champion)
- Italy (tournament in Serbia)
- Germany (tournament in Netherlands)

=== Bracket ===
Semifinals
Austria	19
Italy	0
Germany	0
France	7

Finals
Austria	17
France	7
Third place
Italy	0
Germany	50

=== Matches ===
Quarter	1	2	3	4	Total
Germany	0	0	0	0	0
France	7	0	0	0	7

at Stade Laurent Plegelatte, Villepinte, France

- Date: Jul 14, 2017
- Game time: 14:00

Quarter	1	2	3	4	Total
Italy	0	0	0	0	0
Austria	3	9	7	0	19

at Stade Laurent Plegelatte, Villepinte, France

- Date: Jul 14, 2017
- Game time: 18:00
