= Borregos Salvajes CEM football =

- First season: 1994
- Head coach: Mario Acevedo
- Location: Atizapán, State of Mexico
- Stadium: Estadio Corral de Plástico (capacity: 6,000)
- League: ONEFA
- Conference: Conferencia Premier
- Colors: Blue and White

National championships
- Claimed: 2 (2000, 2003)

Conference championships
- 3 (10 Grandes: 2; Nacional: 1)
- Rivalries: ITESM; ITESM Toluca; UDLAP

Borregos Salvajes CEM (English: CEM Wild Rams), or simply Borregos CEM, is a college American football team that represents the Monterrey Institute of Technology and Higher Education, Campus State of Mexico. Unlike traditional teams in Mexico, Borregos Salvajes CEM is a younger program, tracing is roots to the late 1970s. The team has won two national championships in 2000 and 2003.

With the expansion of the ITESM private education system, the school founded alternative campuses outside its home city of Monterrey, which included the Campus Estado de México. Then the origins of the team are the late 1970s when the Campus Estado de México was founded and built in Atizapán de Zaragoza in the State of Mexico. The only buildings were the so-called "Torre Central", Aulas I, the Cafeteria, the gym and the athletics and football court.

Initially, the team developed only youth categories (Juvenil) and didn't appear in the most important competition (Liga Mayor).

At the end of the 1980s the team entered the Liga Mayor in the second-tier Conferencia Nacional, where they won the championship and promotion to the Conferencia Metropolitana.

Their home stadium is the Estadio TEC CEM, frequently called the "Corral de Plástico".

== History ==
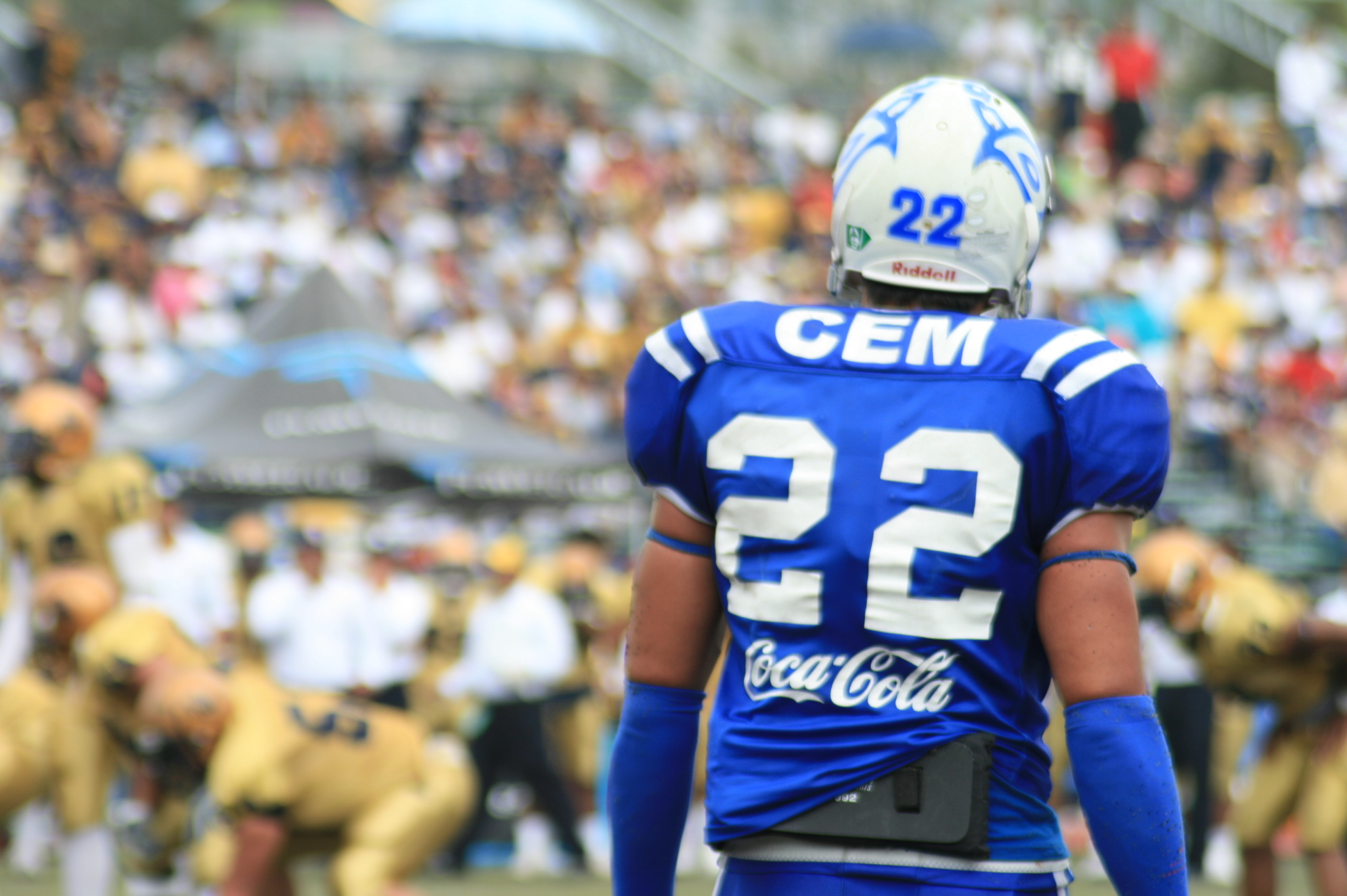
A Borregos CEM player in 2007.

The Borregos Salvajes CEM competed in the ONEFA and later in the Conferencia Premier CONADEIP. In 2016, ITESM authorities decided to merge its three Greater Mexico City college football programs (ITESM CCM, ITESM CEM and ITESM Santa Fe) into one new team named Borregos Salvajes México, thus, ending the Borregos CEM program. During its existence, the team won two national championships in 2000 and 2003.

=== Beginnings (1994–1996) ===
The precedent of the Liga Mayor team was established in 1979 in the ITESM Campus Estado de México (CEM). In 1994, the Borregos CEM made their debut in the ONEFA Liga Mayor. The team started competing in the Conferencia Nacional, which was the second tier of college football in Mexico. On their first season, led by coach Rafael Duk, Borregos CEM managed to qualify to the playoffs but lost the final against the Panteras Negras UAM 0–13. The next year the team reached the final again but lost to the Guerreros Aztecas UNAM 17–19. In 1996, Borregos CEM reached the Conferencia Nacional final for the third time in a row and this time won, defeating Lobos UAC 28–6. By winning the Conferencia Nacional championship, Borregos CEM earned the promotion to the Conferencia de los 10 Grandes, the highest level of college American football in Mexico.

=== 10 Grandes and 12 Grandes (1997–2008) ===
On their first seasons in the top conference Borregos CEM continued having good results, despite the fact that most of the teams that reached the 10 Grandes from the Conferencia Nacional tend to struggle to achieve good results and ended being relegated again.

In 2000, after finishing the regular season undefeated and qualifying to the final, Borregos CEM defeated Borregos Salvajes Monterrey in the final 38–28 to win their first national championship. In 2002, head coach Rafael Duk resigned from the team and Enrique Borda was appointed as the new head coach. The team repeated the feat three years later in 2003 in a replay of the 2000 final, this time Borregos CEM won 38–36.

=== Final years (2009–2015) ===
For the 2009 season, all the ITESM teams left the ONEFA and created their own league, the Campeonato Universitario Borregos. Borregos CEM and Borregos Monterrey played the tournament final, won by Monterrey 42–23.

In 2010 Borregos CEM joined the newly created Conferencia Premier and on the following seasons the team remained as one of the new conference's title contenders but without winning any title. In 2012 coach Enrique Borda left the team and was replaced by Enrique Zárate, who worked as defensive coordinator under Borda. Zárate remained as head coach only for one season and was replaced by Jorge Guerra in 2014.

=== Borregos Salvajes México (2016–2020) ===
Ahead of the 2016 season, ITESM authorities decided to merge the three Greater Mexico City teams (ITESM CCM, ITESM CEM and ITESM Santa Fe) into a new one: Borregos Salvajes México. This new team would still play at the Corral de Plástico and kept most of Borregos CEM staff and players for the 2016 tournament. Because of this, the new team was seen as Borregos CEM spiritual successor.

=== Return to ONEFA ===
The team returned to ONEFA in 2021 as the Borregos Salvajes CEM.

== Championships ==
=== National championships ===
Year	Coach	Record	Opponent	Result
2000	Rafael Duk	11–0	Borregos Salvajes Monterrey	W 38–28
2003	Enrique Borda	10–1	Borregos Salvajes Monterrey	W 38–36

=== Conference championships ===
Year	Conference	Coach	Record	Opponent	Result
1996	Nacional	Rafael Duk	11–0	Lobos UAC	W 28–6
2000	10 Grandes	Rafael Duk	11–0	Borregos Salvajes Monterrey	W 38–28
2003	10 Grandes	Enrique Borda	10–1	Borregos Salvajes Monterrey	W 38–36
