= 2018 IFAF U-19 World Championship =

American football season

IFAF World Junior Football Championship

Tournament details
- Host nation: Mexico
- Dates: July 15 – July 22
- No. of nations: Six

Final positions
- Champions: Canada
- Runner-up: Mexico
- Third-place: United States

Tournament statistics
- Attendance: 76,115
- MVP of the tournament: Andreas Dueck, QB, Canada

The 2018 IFAF U-19 World Championship was an international American football tournament for junior teams (19 years and under) that took place at Mexico City from July 15 to 22. This was the first time that Mexico hosted an IFAF World Junior Championship competition.

Teams were split into higher and lower groups by seeding. Three teams from higher seeded group and one team from lower seeded group would advance to the semi-final. This would be the last world junior championship staged in the U19 age classification. The 2020 championship scheduled for the United States was cancelled by IFAF in March 2020 due to complications from the coronavirus pandemic. The next world junior championship is a U20 competition that was hosted by Football Canada in Edmonton, Alberta in July 2024.

== Participants and seeding ==
- 1. Canada
- 2. United States
- 3. Mexico
- 4. Japan
- 5. Sweden
- 6. Australia

== Matches ==
Game 1

Quarter	1	2	3	4	Total
Australia	0	0	0	0	0
United States	13	7	13	6	39

at Estadio Olympico '68

- Date: July 15, 2018
- Game weather: 26c, overcast
- Game attendance: 3,500

Game 2

Quarter	1	2	3	4	Total
Sweden	0	0	6	0	6
Canada	21	14	14	0	49

at Estadio Olympico '68

- Date: July 15, 2018
- Game weather: 24c, rain
- Game attendance: 3,500

Game 3

Quarter	1	2	3	4	Total
Japan	0	6	8	0	14
Mexico	3	0	14	14	31

at Estadio Olympico '68

- Date: July 15, 2018
- Game weather: 21c, showers
- Game attendance: 8,500

Game 4 (Placement game)

Quarter	1	2	3	4	Total
Australia	0	0	6	0	6
Sweden	6	7	0	6	19

at Estadio Olympico '68

- Date: July 18, 2016
- Game weather: 23c, partly cloudy
- Game attendance: 1,800

Game 5 (semifinal)

Quarter	1	2	3	4	Total
Japan	0	7	9	6	22
Canada	7	14	7	0	28

at Estadio Olympico '68

- Date: July 18, 2018
- Game weather: 25c, partly cloudy
- Game attendance: 6,500
- AFI game recap

Game 6 (semifinal)

Quarter	1	2	3	4	Total
Mexico	7	16	7	3	33
United States	0	0	6	3	9

at Estadio Olympico '68

- Date: July 18, 2018
- Game weather: 23c, partly cloudy
- Game attendance: 15,800
- USA Today game recap

Game 7 (Fifth Place Game)

Quarter	1	2	3	4	Total
Australia	0	0	14	0	14
Japan	10	10	17	14	51

at Estadio Olympico '68

- Date: July 22, 2018
- Game weather: 24c, sunny
- Game attendance: 1,500
- AFI game recap

Game 8 (bronze-medal game)

Quarter	1	2	3	4	Total
Sweden	0	0	2	7	9
United States	14	27	13	7	61

at Estadio Olympico '68

- Date: July 22, 2018
- Game weather: 24c, sunny
- Game attendance: 4,500
- AFI game recap

Game 9 (gold-medal game)

Quarter	1	2	3	4	Total
Mexico	0	0	7	0	7
Canada	3	7	3	0	13

at Estadio Olympico '68

- Date: July 22, 2016
- Game weather: 24c, sunny
- Game attendance: 33,515
- AFI game recap
