= 2008 European Junior Championship of American football =

2008 European Junior Championship
Quarter	1	2	3	4	Tot
Sweden	0	0	0	6	6
Germany	0	0	0	9	9
Dates	July 12–20, 2008
City	Seville, Spain
Stadiums	San Pablo and La Cartuja
- Results
(gold) Winner	Germany
(silver) Runners-up	Sweden
(bronze) 3rd Place	France

The 2008 European Junior Championship was the ninth edition of the European Junior Championship of American football. It was held from July 12–20 in Sevilla, Spain.

== Participants ==
- Austria
- Denmark
- Finland
- France
- Germany
- Russia
- Spain
- Sweden

== Matches ==
=== Group A ===
Team	Played	Won	Lost	Points for	Points against
Sweden	3	3	0	87	13
France	3	2	1	65	51
Russia	3	1	2	55	48
Spain	3	0	3	39	134

Quarter	1	2	3	4	Total
Russia	0	0	0	0	0
Sweden	0	6	14	7	27

at La Cartuja

- Date: July 12, 2008
- Game time: 10:30
- Game weather: Sunny
- Game attendance: 400
- Referee: Noren
- Box score

Quarter	1	2	3	4	Total
Spain	10	0	7	8	25
France	6	16	10	13	45

at La Cartuja

- Date: July 12, 2008
- Game time: 18:00
- Referee: Lenoire
- Box score

Quarter	1	2	3	4	Total
Sweden	7	6	27	0	40
Spain	0	0	0	0	0

at La Cartuja

- Date: July 14, 2008
- Game time: 10:30
- Game weather: Sunny
- Game attendance: 400
- Referee: Lenoire
- Box score

Quarter	1	2	3	4	Total
France	0	7	0	0	7
Russia	0	6	0	0	6

at La Cartuja

- Date: July 14, 2008
- Game time: 18:00
- Game weather: Clouded
- Game attendance: 256
- Box score

Quarter	1	2	3	4	Total
Spain	0	0	7	7	14
Russia	14	12	14	9	49

at La Cartuja

- Date: July 16, 2008
- Game time: 10:30
- Game weather: Sunny
- Game attendance: 300
- Box score

Quarter	1	2	3	4	Total
Sweden	6	6	0	8	20
France	0	7	0	6	13

at La Cartuja

- Date: July 16, 2008
- Game time: 18:00
- Game weather: Sunny
- Game attendance: 400
- Box score

=== Group B ===
Team	Played	Won	Lost	Points for	Points against
Germany	3	3	0	61	14
Denmark	3	1	2	67	61
Austria	3	1	2	44	37
Finland	3	1	2	29	89

Quarter	1	2	3	4	Total
Finland	0	7	0	0	7
Germany	7	6	8	13	34

at San Pablo

- Date: July 13, 2008
- Game time: 18:00
- Game weather: Sunny
- Game attendance: 100
- Referee: E.Bolstad
- Box score

Quarter	1	2	3	4	Total
Denmark	7	7	0	0	14
Austria	14	0	14	7	35

at Borguillo Stadium

- Date: July 13, 2008
- Game time: 19:00
- Game weather: Sunny
- Game attendance: 200
- Box score

Quarter	1	2	3	4	Total
Austria	0	7	2	0	9
Finland	0	0	6	10	16

at San Pablo

- Date: July 15, 2008
- Game time: 10:35
- Game weather: Sunny
- Game attendance: 150
- Referee: E.Bolstad
- Box score

Quarter	1	2	3	4	Total
Germany	6	8	6	0	20
Denmark	0	0	7	0	7

at San Pablo

- Date: July 15, 2008
- Game time: 18:04
- Game weather: Cloudy
- Game attendance: 150
- Referee: K.Wickham
- Box score

Quarter	1	2	3	4	Total
Finland	0	0	6	0	6
Denmark	21	0	18	7	46

at San Pablo

- Date: July 17, 2008
- Game time: 10:36
- Game weather: Sunny
- Game attendance: 250
- Referee: K.Wickham
- Box score

Quarter	1	2	3	4	Total
Austria	0	0	0	0	0
Germany	7	0	0	0	7

at San Pablo

- Date: July 17, 2008
- Game time: 18:04
- Game weather: Sunny
- Game attendance: 320
- Referee: E.Bolstad
- Box score

=== 7th place ===
Quarter	1	2	3	4	Total
Spain	0	0	7	14	21
Finland	0	20	7	11	38

at San Pablo

- Date: July 19, 2008
- Game time: 10:33
- Game weather: Sunny
- Game attendance: 150
- Referee: R.Lenoire
- Box score

=== 5th place ===
Quarter	1	2	3	4	Total
Russia	0	6	7	0	13
Austria	12	8	0	0	20

at San Pablo

- Date: Jul 19, 2008
- Game time: 18:09
- Game weather: Sunny
- Game attendance: 250
- Referee: E.Noren
- Box score

=== 3rd place ===
Quarter	1	2	3	4	Total
Denmark	0	7	0	7	14
France	14	14	0	0	28

at La Cartuja

- Date: Jul 20, 2008
- Game time: 10:30
- Game weather: Cloudy
- Game attendance: 550
- Referee: E.Bolstad
- Box score

=== Final ===
Quarter	1	2	3	4	Total
Sweden	0	0	0	6	6
Germany	0	0	0	9	9

at La Cartuja

- Date: Jul 20, 2008
- Game time: 18:00
- Game weather: Cloudy
- Game attendance: 650
- Referee: K.Wickham
- Box score

== All-Star team ==
Offense

- (Sweden) #7 QB Anders Hermodsson
- (Sweden) #6 RB Hampus Hellermark
- (Russia) #22 RB Alexey Medvedev
- (Spain) #11 WR Daniel Belsbo
- (France) #9 WR Mickael Doukoure
- (Denmark) #7 WR Kevin Narthey
- (Sweden) #57 OL Mathias Franzén
- (Germany) #70 OL Nils Hampel
- (Austria) #61 OL Alexander Milanovic
- (Germany) #72 OL Alexander Bodewig
- (France) #59 OL Clement Rabache

Defense

- (Denmark) #41 DL Rasmus Andersen
- (Sweden) #99 DL Olof Flenström
- (Russia) #95 DL Kirill Zunin
- (Germany) #98 DL Paco Varol
- (Denmark) #2 LB Niklas Frausing
- (Russia) #54 LB Ramiz Dadashev
- (Austria) #27 LB Marku Greber
- (France) #24 DB Loris Legras
- (Germany) #24 DB Aleksander Niemas
- (Denmark) #26 DB Kristian Warthoe
- (Russia) #16 DB Alexander Gureev
- Tournament MVP: (Sweden) #6 Hampus Hellermark
