= 2012 IFAF U-19 World Championship =

Tournament details
- Host nation: United States
- Dates: June 30 – July 8
- No. of nations: 8

Final positions
- Champions: Canada
- Runner-up: United States
- Third-place: Japan

The 2012 IFAF U-19 World Championship took place in 2012 at Austin, Texas. This championship that included the world's eight best high school-aged (19 and under) national American football teams from five continents was played at Burger Stadium in Austin, Texas, a football and soccer venue. The tournament was held from June 30 to July 8. Canada won gold, the United States silver, and Japan won a bronze in the tournament.

== Participants and seeding ==
- 1. United States
- 2. Canada
- 3. Japan
- 4. Panama
- 5. Austria
- 6. France
- 7. Sweden
- 8. American Samoa

Three nations from the 2009 U-19 World Championship failed to qualify for this year's event: Mexico, Germany and New Zealand.

== Bracket ==
=== Winners bracket ===
Quarter-finals
Game 2
Japan	27
France	6
Game 3
Canada	43
Sweden	0
Game 1
Panama	0
Austria	40
Game 4
United States	27
American Samoa	6

Semi-finals
Game 7
Japan	24
Canada	33
Game 8
Austria	7
(United States) USA	70

Gold medal game
Game 12
Canada	23
(United States) USA	17
Bronze medal game
Game 11
Japan	7
Austria	0

=== Consolation bracket ===
Semi-finals
Game 5
France	41
Sweden	0
Game 6
Panama	0
American Samoa	51

5th place playoff
Game 10
France	14
American Samoa	27
7th place playoff
Game 9
Sweden	54
Panama	20

== Scores ==
=== Game Day 1 - June 30 ===
Game 1: Team	1	2	3	4	T
Panama	0	0	0	0	0
Austria	12	14	7	7	40

Game 2: Team	1	2	3	4	T
Japan	17	7	3	0	27
France	0	0	6	0	6

Game 3: Team	1	2	3	4	T
Canada	0	10	13	20	43
Sweden	0	0	0	0	0

Game 4: Team	1	2	3	4	T
United States	13	7	0	7	27
American Samoa	0	6	0	0	6

=== Game Day 2 - July 3 ===
Game 5: Team	1	2	3	4	T
France	7	17	14	3	41
Sweden	0	0	0	0	0

Game 6: Team	1	2	3	4	T
Panama	0	0	0	0	0
American Samoa	14	12	14	11	51

=== Game Day 3 - July 4 ===
Game 7: Team	1	2	3	4	T
Japan	14	0	3	7	24
Canada	14	9	0	10	33

Game 8: Team	1	2	3	4	T
Austria	7	0	0	0	7
(United States) USA	7	28	28	7	70

=== Game Day 4 - July 6 ===
Game 9: Team	1	2	3	4	T
Sweden	7	19	14	14	54
Panama	8	6	0	6	20

Game 10: Team	1	2	3	4	T
France	7	0	7	0	14
American Samoa	0	21	0	6	27

=== Game Day 5 - July 7 ===
Game 11: Team	1	2	3	4	T
Japan	0	0	0	7	7
Austria	0	0	0	0	0

Game 12: Team	1	2	3	4	T
Canada	3	7	6	7	23
(United States) USA	0	7	7	3	17

== Official website ==
http://www.u19championship.com/

== See also ==
- IFAF
- IFAF World Championship
- 2009 IFAF Junior World Championship
