= United States national junior American football team =

The United States national U-19 American football team represents the United States in under-19 international American football competitions. The US has competed in all five IFAF Junior World Championship competitions in which they won two gold, two silver, and one bronze medal. The US has also won the IFAF International Bowl seven times. They are currently ranked no.2 in the IFAF U-19 rankings. Top competitions for the U-19s are the IFAF Junior World Championship, IFAF International Bowl, and U-19 North American Championships.

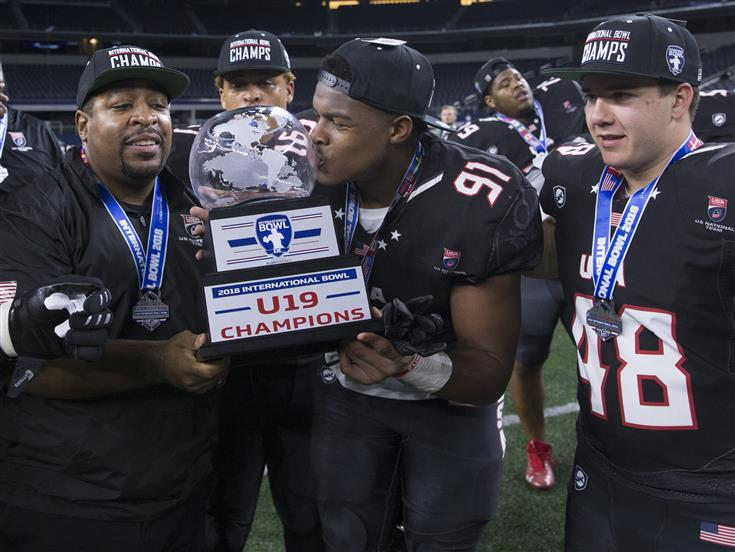
U-19 national team during the 2018 International Bowl

Many top NFL players have gone through the U-19 National team, including Chase Young, Jameis Winston, Mac Jones, Dwayne Haskins, Todd Gurley, Trevon Diggs, and Mecole Hardman.

== Honors ==
=== Competitive ===
- IFAF Junior World Championship
  - (gold) Champions (2): 2009, 2014
  - (silver) Runners-up (2): 2012, 2016
  - (bronze) Third place (1): 2018
- International Bowl
  - (gold) Champions (7): 2014, 2015, 2016, 2017, 2018, 2019, 2020
- North American Championship
  - (gold) Champions (1): 2018
- NFL Global Junior Championship
  - (gold) Champions (4): 2001, 2002, 2003, 2004
  - (silver) Runners-up (3): 2005, 2006, 2007
  - (bronze) Third place (1): 2000

== Results ==
=== NFL Global Junior Championship ===
- 2000: Third place
- 2001: Champions
- 2002: Champions
- 2003: Champions
- 2004: Champions
- 2005: Runner-up
- 2006: Runner-up
- 2007: Runner-up

=== IFAF Junior World Championship ===
- 2009 IFAF Junior World Championship - Champions: 41-3 Vs. Canada
- 2012 IFAF U-19 World Championship - Runners-up: 17-23 Vs. Canada
- 2014 IFAF U-19 World Championship - Champions: 40-17 Vs. Canada
- 2016 IFAF U-19 World Championship - Runners-up: 6-24 Vs. Canada
- 2018 IFAF U-19 World Championship - Third place: 61-9 Vs. Sweden

=== International Bowl ===
- 2014 Champions: 43-7 Vs. Canada
- 2015 Champions: 35-0 Vs. Canada
- 2016 Champions: 33-0 Vs. Canada
- 2017 Champions: 33-11 Vs. Canada
- 2018 Champions: 47-7 Vs. Canada
- 2019 Champions: 50-0 Vs. Tamaulipas
- 2020 Champions: 67-0 Vs Panama

=== North American Championship ===
- 2018 Champions: 33-11 Vs. Canada

== Select team ==
The US National team also fields a select team at the U-19 level. The U-19 select team competes at the International Bowl every year.

== Select team International Bowl records ==
- 2016 Runners-up: 31-13 Vs. Canada
- 2018 Champions: 48-13 Vs. Team Nordic
- 2019 Champions: 53-0 Vs. Nuevo Leon

== Rivals ==
=== Canada ===
The U-19's biggest rival is the Canada men's national football team. These two teams are widely considered as the two major powerhouses at the U-19 level, with all the U-19 World Championships being won between the two teams. The US leads the all time series 14-6.

=== Panama ===
In recent years the US has developed a rivalry with Panama.
