= 2016 IFAF U-19 World Championship =

Tournament details
- Host nation: China
- Dates: June 29 – July 10
- No. of nations: 7

Final positions
- Champions: Canada
- Runner-up: United States
- Third-place: Mexico

The 2016 IFAF U-19 World Championship was an international American football tournament for junior teams (19 years and under) that took place at Harbin, China from June 29 to July 10. This is the first time that China has hosted an international American football competition.

Teams were split into higher and lower groups by seeding. Three teams from higher seeded group and one team from lower seeded group would advance to the semi-final.

== Participants and seeding ==
- 1. United States
- 2. Canada
- 3. Mexico
- 4. Austria
- 5. Japan
- 6. Australia
- 7. China

Germany qualified for the championship but did not attend.

== Matches ==
Game 1

Quarter	1	2	3	4	Total
China	0	0	0	0	0
Australia	39	20	13	0	72

- Date: Jun 29, 2016
- Game time: 16:00

Game 2

Quarter	1	2	3	4	Total
Mexico	0	16	0	0	16
Canada	3	0	13	14	30

- Date: Jun 30, 2016
- Game time: 14:00

Game 3

Quarter	1	2	3	4	Total
Austria	6	8	0	0	14
United States	0	36	14	15	65

- Date: Jun 30, 2016
- Game time: 17:30

Game 4

Quarter	1	2	3	4	Total
Australia	0	0	0	0	0
Japan	22	13	0	7	42

- Date: Jul 2, 2016
- Game time: 16:00

Game 5

Quarter	1	2	3	4	Total
Austria	0	0	7	0	7
Mexico	7	19	0	20	46

- Date: Jul 3, 2016
- Game time: 18:00

Game 6

Quarter	1	2	3	4	Total
Canada	7	7	0	0	14
United States	0	18	0	14	32

- Date: Jul 3, 2016
- Game time: 17:00

Game 7

Quarter	1	2	3	4	Total
China	0	0	0	0	0
Australia	35	13	14	12	74

- Date: Jul 6, 2016
- Game time: 16:00

Game 8 (semi-final)

Quarter	1	2	3	4	Total
Japan	0	6	6	8	20
United States	6	3	21	20	50

- Date: Jul 7, 2016
- Game time: 13:00

Game 9 (semi-final)

Quarter	1	2	3	4	Total
Mexico	0	0	14	7	21
Canada	3	10	15	0	28

- Date: Jul 7, 2016
- Game time: 17:00

Game 10 (5th-place game)

Quarter	1	2	3	4	Total
Australia	0	13	0	0	13
Austria	13	13	0	17	43

- Date: Jul 9, 2016
- Game time: 16:00

Game 11 (3rd-place game)

Quarter	1	2	3	4	Total
Japan	0	7	0	0	7
Mexico	7	3	0	14	24

- Date: Jul 10, 2016
- Game time: 13:00

Game 12 (final)

Quarter	1	2	3	4	Total
Canada	0	14	10	0	24
United States	0	3	3	0	6

- Date: Jul 10, 2016
- Game time: 17:00
