= 2009 IFAF Junior World Championship =

Tournament details
- Host nation: United States
- Dates: June 27 – July 5
- No. of nations: 8

Final positions
- Champions: United States
- Runner-up: Canada
- Third-place: Japan

The IFAF Junior World Cup took place in 2009 at Canton, Ohio. JWC games between the world's eight best high school-aged (19 and under) national teams from five continents were played at Canton's historic Fawcett Stadium, home of the NFL's annual Pro Football Hall of Fame Game, adjacent to the Hall. The tournament was held from June 27 to July 5.

== Participants ==
- United States (qualified automatically as host)
- Japan (invitee)
- Canada (invitee)
- Mexico (winner of North American playoff)
- New Zealand (winner of Oceania playoff)
- Germany (European champion)
- Sweden (European runner-up)
- France (European 3rd place)

== Seeding ==
1. Canada
2. United States
3. Mexico
4. Japan
5. Germany
6. Sweden
7. France
8. New Zealand

== Bracket ==
=== Winners bracket ===
Quarter-finals
Game 1
Canada	55
New Zealand	0
Game 2
Japan	10
Germany	7
Game 3
Mexico	41
Sweden	0
Game 4
United States	78
France	0

Semi-finals
Game 7
Canada	38
Japan	35
Game 8
Mexico	0
United States	55

Gold medal game
Game 12
Canada	3
United States	41
Bronze medal game
Game 11
Japan	42
Mexico	27

=== Consolation bracket ===
Semi-finals
Game 5
New Zealand	7
Germany	52
Game 6
Sweden	24
France	14

5th place playoff
Game 9
Germany	14
Sweden	0
7th place playoff
Game 10
New Zealand	6
France	34

== Scores ==
=== Game Day 1 - June 27 ===
Team	1	2	3	4	T
Canada	20	21	7	7	55
New Zealand	0	0	0	0	0

Team	1	2	3	4	T
Japan	0	0	3	7	10
Germany	7	0	0	0	7

Team	1	2	3	4	T
Mexico	7	13	7	14	41
Sweden	0	0	0	0	0

Team	1	2	3	4	T
United States	24	13	13	28	78
France	0	0	0	0	0

=== Game Day 2 - July 1 ===
Team	1	2	3	4	T
New Zealand	0	0	0	7	7
Germany	14	9	22	7	52

Team	1	2	3	4	T
Sweden	0	17	7	0	24
France	6	0	0	8	14

Team	1	2	3	4	T
Canada	7	14	7	10	38
Japan	7	7	7	14	35

Team	1	2	3	4	T
Mexico	0	0	0	0	0
United States	27	14	7	7	55

=== Game Day 3 - July 4 ===
Team	1	2	3	4	T
New Zealand	0	0	0	6	6
France	7	14	6	7	34

Team	1	2	3	4	T
Sweden	0	0	0	0	0
Germany	7	0	0	7	14

Team	1	2	3	4	T
Japan	21	7	14	0	42
Mexico	7	6	0	14	27

=== Game Day 4 - July 5 ===
Team	1	2	3	4	T
Canada	3	0	0	0	3
United States	15	3	14	9	41

== Qualifying ==
North America:

Semifinal		Final
		Mexico	26
Panama	52	Panama	0
(The Bahamas) Bahamas	6

Oceanic:

Final
New Zealand	12
Australia	7

Europe: The European teams qualified via the 2008 EFAF European Junior Championship.

Bronze medal game
France	28
Denmark	14

Gold medal game
Germany	9
Sweden	6

== See also ==
- IFAF World Championship
- IFAF
