= 2014 IFAF U-19 World Championship =

Tournament details
- Host nation: Kuwait
- Dates: July 7 – July 16
- No. of nations: 8

Final positions
- Champions: United States
- Runner-up: Canada
- Third-place: Mexico

The 2014 IFAF U19 World Championship was the third edition of the IFAF U19 World Championship, an international American football tournament for junior teams (19 years and under, or high school football-aged in the United States). It was hosted by Kuwait from July 7 to 16. The teams participating were Canada, reigning champion; Austria, France and Germany, which won qualification at the 2013 European Junior Championship; Kuwait, as host, in their first time in the tournament; Japan, as Asia's participant; USA representing the Americas; and Mexico, which qualified by beating Panama.

== Participants and seeding ==
- 1. United States
- 2. Canada
- 3. Japan
- 4. Mexico
- 5. Germany
- 6. France
- 7. Kuwait
- 8. Austria

== Scores ==
=== Group stage ===
Group A

Teams	W	D	L	Pct	PF	PA	TD
Canada	3	0	0	1.000	183	7	26
Austria	2	0	1	0.667	88	43	13
France	1	0	2	0.333	81	80	12
Kuwait	0	0	3	0.000	0	229	0

==== Game Day 1 - July 7th ====
Game 1: 8pm	1	2	3	4	T
Austria	0	17	7	0	24
France	0	0	0	7	7

Game 2: 11pm	1	2	3	4	T
Canada	36	14	27	14	91
Kuwait	0	0	0	0	0

==== Game Day 2 - July 10th ====
Game 1: 8pm	1	2	3	4	T
Canada	14	10	13	19	56
France	0	0	0	0	0

Game 2: 11pm	1	2	3	4	T
Austria	30	14	13	7	64
Kuwait	0	0	0	0	0

==== Game Day 3 - July 13th ====
Game 1: 8pm	1	2	3	4	T
Austria	0	0	7	0	7
Canada	7	7	7	15	36

Game 2: 11pm	1	2	3	4	T
Kuwait	0	0	0	0	0
France	42	7	12	13	74

Group B

Teams	W	D	L	Pct	PF	PA	TD
United States	3	0	0	1.000	146	14	21
Mexico	1	1	1	0.500	73	80	10
Japan	1	1	1	0.500	72	87	10
Germany	0	0	3	0.000	27	137	4

==== Game Day 1 - July 7th ====
Game 1: 8pm	1	2	3	4	T
Mexico	0	0	7	7	14
(United States) USA	7	14	7	21	49

Game 2: 11pm	1	2	3	4	T
Germany	0	0	7	13	20
Japan	13	7	14	14	48

==== Game Day 2 - July 10th ====
Game 1: 8pm	1	2	3	4	T
Mexico	0	7	7	10	24
Japan	10	14	0	0	24

Game 2: 11pm	1	2	3	4	T
Germany	0	0	0	0	0
(United States) USA	21	20	13	0	54

==== Game Day 3 - July 13th ====
Game 1: 8pm	1	2	3	4	T
Mexico	14	7	7	7	35
Germany	0	0	0	7	7

Game 2: 11pm	1	2	3	4	T
Japan	0	0	0	0	0
(United States) USA	7	29	0	7	43

=== Medal games ===
==== Game Day 4 - July 15th ====
7th place: 8pm	1	2	3	4	T
Kuwait	0	0	0	0	0
Germany	21	27	14	14	76

5th place: 11pm	1	2	3	4	T
France	7	0	0	0	7
Japan	10	7	0	13	30

==== Game Day 5 - July 16th ====
3rd place: 8pm	1	2	3	4	T
Mexico	10	7	0	14	31
Austria	7	10	0	13	30

1st place: 11pm	1	2	3	4	T
(United States) USA	12	0	22	6	40
Canada	7	7	0	3	17
