= Ed Franco =

American football player (1915–1992)

- Franco c. 1936

No. 45, 19
- Position: Offensive tackle

Personal information
- Born: April 24, 1915; New York City, New York, U.S.
- Died: November 18, 1992 (aged 77); Bayonne, New Jersey, U.S.
- Listed height: 5 ft 8 in (1.73 m)
- Listed weight: 205 lb (93 kg)

Career information
- High school: William L. Dickinson (Jersey City, New Jersey)
- College: Fordham (1934-1937)
- NFL draft: 1938: 5th round, 31st overall pick

Career history
- Union City Rams (1938); Cleveland Rams (1941)*; Boston Yanks (1944)
- * Offseason or practice squad member only

Awards and highlights
- Consensus All-American (1937); First-team All-American (1936); First-team All-Eastern (1937)

Career NFL statistics
- Games played: 10
- Games started: 9
- Stats at Pro Football Reference
- College Football Hall of Fame

Edmondo Guido Armando Franco (April 24, 1915 – November 18, 1992) was an American professional football player for the Boston Yanks of the National Football League (NFL). He played college football for the Fordham Rams and earned fame as one of the legendary Seven Blocks of Granite. He was inducted into the College Football Hall of Fame in 1980.

== Early life ==
Ed Franco was the youngest of nine children born to Italian immigrants, Nicola and Filomena Franco, on Christopher Street, in New York City. The family later moved to Jersey City, New Jersey, where Franco began to display his extraordinary athletic ability. He earned All-State honors at William L. Dickinson High School as both a guard for the football team and a catcher for baseball.

== Seven Blocks of Granite college football fame ==
After high school, Franco attended Fordham University, where he was elected president of his freshman class. He played guard and tackle for the legendary "Seven Blocks of Granite," coached by the Sleepy Jim Crowley, one of the famed Four Horsemen of Notre Dame. The 5 ft 8 in (1.73 m), 196-pound (89 kg) Franco was voted as a consensus All-American for both positions following the 1937 and 1938 seasons, only one of two Fordham players ever named consensus All-American. He played alongside the famous Vince Lombardi, the right guard for the Blocks of Granite. In 1935, the Rams posted a 6-1-2 record with five shutouts. The 1936 squad lost only one game, the season finale to New York University. The Blocks saw their peak in 1937 with 8 wins, no losses, and no ties.

Franco served as captain of the East team in the 1938 East-West Shrine Game.

== Professional football career and after ==
Franco had a brief professional career: He was a fifth-round selection (31st overall) of the Cleveland Rams in the 1938 NFL draft, but didn't stay with the team. On December 9, 1939, Franco married his sweetheart Anna May McGinley, a nursing student at Bayonne Nursing School. Franco decided not to continue his professional career, however, since at that time football paid little. Franco returned to Fordham as a line coach for six years, where he helped the Rams gain a Cotton Bowl Classic bid in 1941 and a Sugar Bowl bid in 1942.

In 1944, Franco returned to the NFL and won the starting tackle job in his first game as a member of the Boston Yanks. He coached the American Association Jersey City Giants. Franco worked as the eastern scout for the Green Bay Packers and the Washington Redskins along with coach and close friend Lombardi.

Franco later owned several successful businesses in Jersey City and Secaucus and worked for the Meadowlands Racetrack. He died on November 18, 1992, at the age of 77. He was survived by his three children, Margaret, Ned, and Rosemary, six grandchildren, and seven great-grandchildren.

== Honors ==
In 1980, Ed Franco was elected to the College Football Hall of Fame. That same year, Franco a Jersey City baseball park was dedicated in his name; the park is still in use today. On October 24, 2008, Fordham University honored the memory of its legendary defensive line by dedicating a monument on its Rose Hill campus. The monument—made of seven blocks of granite stone—stands by the entrance to Jack Coffey Field.
