= Eastern Pennsylvania Football League =

Sports League

- Sport: American football
- Founded: 1930s
- First season: 1938
- Folded: 1939
- No. of teams: 4 (1938)
- Country: United States
- Last champion: Hazleton Redskins

The Eastern Pennsylvania Football League (EPFL) was a professional American football minor league that played in 1938. The league was made up of four teams. Some of their players were from the American Association and the Dixie League. The league only lasted one season.

The league champions, Hazleton, were a Washington Redskins farm team.

== 1938 ==
The League's only season was in 1938. They had four teams. The Hazleton Redskins were named champions after posting a 5–1 record when each of the other teams had 2 or less wins. Right before the final game of the season, the Reading Rams moved to Shenandoah, Pennsylvania. Only 5 EPFL players played in the NFL. They were Joe Koons (Scranton), Bud Erickson (Hazleton), Ed Kahn (Hazleton), George Platukis (Hazleton), and John Spirida (Hazleton). The League folded after 1938.

=== Standings ===
Team	W	L	T	Pct.	PF	PA
Hazleton Redskins	5	1	0	.833	98	16
Reading Rams	2	3	0	.400	22	38
Wilkes-Barre Panthers	2	3	1	.400	22	55
Scranton Miners	1	3	1	.600	7	40

Champions: Hazleton Redskins

After the season, Hazleton played against the Dixie League champions, Norfolk Shamrocks, in Richmond, Virginia. The game drew 2,000 fans that saw the Redskins winning 16–14.

== Schedule ==
In the schedule 6 weeks were played, listed below is each game in the schedule.

Week 1

Hazleton Redskins 14 vs. Wilkes-Barre Panthers 0 (October 2, 1938 in Wilkes-Barre)

Reading Rams 6 vs. Scranton Miners 0 (October 2, 1938 in Reading)

Week 2

Reading Rams 9 vs. Wilkes-Barre Panthers 3 (October 9, 1938 in Reading)

Scranton Miners 7 vs. Hazleton Redskins 0 (October 9, 1938 in Hazleton)

Week 3

Hazleton Redskins 20 vs. Scranton Miners 0 (October 16, 1938 in Scranton)

Wilkes-Barre Panthers 3 vs. Reading Rams 0 (October 16, 1938 in Wilkes-Barre)

Week 4

Hazleton Redskins 19 vs. Reading Rams 7 (October 23, 1938 in Hazleton)

Wilkes-Barre Panthers 14 vs. Scranton Miners 0 (October 27, 1938 in Wilkes-Barre)

Week 5

Hazleton Redskins 32 vs. Wilkes-Barre Panthers 2 (October 30, 1938 in Hazleton)

Reading Rams vs. Scranton Miners (At Reading, cancelled due to Reading playing another game on the same day)

Week 6

Wilkes-Barre Panthers 0 vs. Scranton Miners 0 (November 13, 1938 in Scranton)

Hazleton Redskins 13 vs. Reading Rams 0 (November 13, 1938 in Hazleton)

== See also ==
- Pacific Coast Professional Football League
- American Football League (1934)
- American Football League (1936)
- American Football League (1938)
- American Football League (1940)
- Atlantic Coast Football League
