= LeRoy Campbell =

American football player and sheriff (1915–2007)

No. 27, 35, 12
- Position: Quarterback

Personal information
- Born: October 27, 1915; Pittsburgh, Pennsylvania, U.S.
- Died: January 3, 2007 (aged 91); Randallstown, Maryland, U.S.
- Listed height: 5 ft 11 in (1.80 m)
- Listed weight: 200 lb (91 kg)

Career information
- High school: Apollo (PA)
- College: McDaniel

Career history
- Washington Redskins (1937–1938)*; Baltimore Blue Birds (1937); Hazleton Redskins (1938); Paterson Panthers (1939); Richmond Arrows (1940–1941)
- * Offseason or practice squad member only

Awards and highlights
- EPFL champion (1938)

Henry LeRoy "Sunshine" Campbell (October 27, 1915 – January 3, 2007) was an American football player and sheriff. He was a famous minor league football quarterback in the 1930s and was the sheriff of Carroll County for 20 years.

Campbell was born on October 27, 1915, in Pittsburgh, Pennsylvania. He grew up in and went to high school in Apollo, Pennsylvania. He received an athletic scholarship offer from Western Maryland College (now known as McDaniel College). In college football he was named honorable mention All-American. While in college, he was offered opportunities in sports by the Pittsburgh Steelers, Washington Redskins and Cincinnati Reds (baseball). He chose to go to the Washington Redskins football team. He was on their roster in 1937 but did not make any appearances as he also played for the Baltimore Blue Birds of the Dixie League. The next season he was sent to their farm team, the Hazleton Redskins of the Eastern Pennsylvania Football League. He was the Redskins' starting quarterback in all of their games. He led them to a 5 and 1 record for the EPFL championship. He played with the Paterson Panthers of the American Association in 1939 (leading them to the championship) and the Richmond Arrows of the Dixie League from 1940 to 1941. He also tried out with teams in baseball, but was released.

After his playing career, he worked at O'Farrell Brothers, Bohn Pontiac and American Ring & Hammer. He also was active in youth sports as a coach. In 1962, he was elected sheriff of Carroll County, Maryland. He and his wife lived above the jail until 1970. He retired in 1982 after 20 years of service, making him the longest serving Carroll County sheriff. He died on January 3, 2007, at the age of 91.
