= Red Weiner =

American football player (1911–1988)

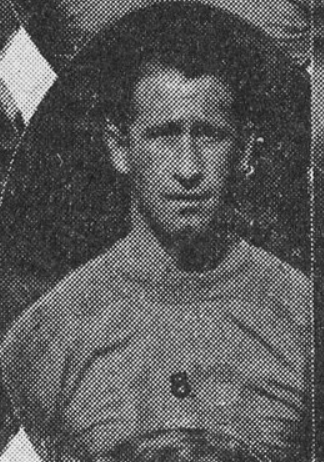
- Weiner with the Philadelphia Eagles in 1934

No. 18, 43, 20
- Position: Back

Personal information
- Born: January 24, 1911; Woodbine, New Jersey, U.S.
- Died: September 17, 1988 (aged 77); Miami, Florida, U.S.
- Listed height: 5 ft 9 in (1.75 m)
- Listed weight: 180 lb (82 kg)

Career information
- High school: Irvington (Irvington, New Jersey)
- College: Muhlenberg (1930–1933)

Career history

Playing
- Philadelphia Eagles (1934); Reading Keys (1934–1935); Stapleton Buffaloes (1936); New York Tigers (1937); Camptown Pros (1937); Newark Tornadoes (1938)

Coaching
- Lebanon Valley Exports (1935) Head coach; Hillside High School (1936) Assistant baseball coach / assistant football coach; Hillside High School (1937–1940) Head baseball coach / assistant football coach; Hillside High School (1941–1942, 1946–1953) Head baseball coach / head football coach; Irvington junior high school (1966) Football coach; Parsippany Hills High School (1967–1968) Sophomore football coach; Parsippany Hills High School (1969–1974) Freshmen football coach

Career NFL statistics
- Games played: 5
- Passing attempts: 6
- Passing completions: 3
- Passing yards: 40
- TD–INT: 2–0
- Rushing yards: 37
- Field goals: 1
- Stats at Pro Football Reference

Albert "Red" Weiner (January 24, 1911 – September 17, 1988) was an American sportsman. From New Jersey, he was one of four brothers involved in sports. Weiner attended Irvington High School where he competed in four sports: football, baseball, basketball and track and field. There, he was a team captain in multiple sports and was considered the school's greatest athlete. After high school, Weiner attended Muhlenberg College in Pennsylvania where he also competed in four sports, excelling in football and baseball. As a senior in football, he was named honorable mention All-American and tied for the national lead in field goals, being named the school's athlete of the year by The Morning Call.

Weiner signed to play professional football with the Philadelphia Eagles of the National Football League (NFL) in 1934. A back, he appeared in five games for the Eagles and threw for two touchdowns on only six pass attempts. After this, he left the Eagles to play for non-NFL Reading Keys. Across the next four seasons, he played for five different football teams, including for three in the American Association (AA). At the same time as his professional football career, Weiner also played minor league baseball and basketball. He served as a coach at Hillside High School after his playing career, winning several local championships.

== Early life ==
Albert Weiner was born on January 24, 1911, in Woodbine, New Jersey, and was Jewish. He was one of four brothers, each of whom were athletes, and three – Albert, Mickey, and Bernie – played professional football. His parents were initially opposed to any of the brothers playing sports, but later became "great fans" after Mickey, the oldest, began playing football.

Weiner attended Irvington High School in New Jersey where he was a standout athlete. He entered the school in 1926 and made the varsity teams in four sports as a freshman: baseball, track and field, football, and basketball. He went on to be considered the school's greatest athlete, according to The Star-Ledger, winning 15 varsity letters out of 16 possible, only missing one track and field letter as a sophomore due to injury. He was named the team captain in both football and basketball (Note: In an interview with The Star-Ledger in 1952, he said that he captained the baseball team as well; however, in a later interview with the paper in 1975, he said that his biggest regret in sports was that "I never was captain of the baseball teams at either Muhlenberg or at Irvington, and I always wanted it.") and recalled being named all-state in both football and baseball.

Weiner was a catcher in baseball, a back in football, and a guard in basketball. He batted over .400 in baseball and was described as "an excellent running back in the single wing in football, and a kicker of no mean pretensions," as well as a "fine guard" in basketball, despite standing at only 5 feet 9 inches (1.75 m). He recalled that as a junior, he was named the best athlete in North Jersey by the World-Telegram. He said that he batted .475 as a senior but despite this did not repeat as the award-winner, as "Some kid from Clifton hit something like .625."

As baseball and track were held at the same time, whenever Irvington played both sports at home, Weiner "did double duty." The Star-Ledger described how, "In between innings, he would shuck his catching togs and jog over to the nearby track, pick up a javelin and throw for the track and field team."

== College career ==
=== 1930–1932 ===
Weiner enrolled at Muhlenberg College in Pennsylvania in 1930. He was ineligible to play varsity sports that year as a freshman. During this time, he played basketball for a local Jewish all-stars exhibition team. Then, as a sophomore, Weiner won four varsity letters, in each of the four sports he starred in while at Irvington. Track and field was discontinued following the 1931 season, and thus Weiner was only able to achieve three varsity letters per year in subsequent seasons. Mid-season with the football team in 1931, he was promoted to being the starting quarterback.

Weiner became a top player for the Muhlenberg baseball team; by May 1932, in his second season, he was their leading batter with an average of .500, as well as the team's leader in both hits and home runs. He then opened the 1932 football season as a starting halfback for Muhlenberg, having several key performances in their season. He also saw significant action at quarterback, being described as their lead "signal-barker," and was additionally used as a punter and kicker. In the first game, he had a 60-yard interception return which helped them defeat Saint Joseph's. He was also cited as one of the top players in their 6–0 loss to Lebanon Valley, and although the Mules lost against Lehigh 25–6, Weiner was noted in The Morning Call as the Mules' "offensive spark," as "Time after time he got away for substantial gains, he passed perfectly and punted well." Later, in a November game against Gettysburg, Weiner returned the opening kickoff 90 yards for a touchdown and was a major figure in Muhlenberg's 26–7 upset win, with The Morning Call noting of his kick return: "He went through the entire Gettysburg team in his wild dash ... shaking off one would-be-tackler after another, and seldom if ever has there been a finer exhibition of broken field running on the local gridiron." After the season, he was selected to the all-conference team named by Muhlenberg coach George Holstrom, at quarterback.

=== 1933–1934 ===
Following the 1932 football season, Weiner returned to the Muhlenberg basketball team, for which he played center. After then winning another letter for the baseball team, he returned to the football team for a final season in 1933. He opened the season as starting right halfback and made several "dazzling" plays in their opening win over Saint Joseph's, according to The Morning Call, including a 32-yard touchdown run. He was known for playing every second of games, being sometimes the only Muhlenberg player to do so. He was also considered such a top player that at times, coach John Utz would have Weiner run the ball on up to seven plays straight, noting that he was less likely to fumble than others on the team; in one game he was noted to have run the ball "more than two-thirds of the time." That season, he kicked field goals that allowed Muhlenberg to defeat Penn State, 3–0, and Ursinus, 3–0, and played "sensational" in several others. In November, against Lehigh, he scored all 10 points (on a touchdown, extra point and a field goal) in the Mules' 10–0 victory, which was the first time they had beaten the school since 1930, when Weiner's brother, Mickey, had captained the Mules. He played his final game against Dickinson later that month and scored every point in a 7–0 victory, which allowed Muhlenberg to win the conference title with a record of 6–3.

Following the 1933 football season, Weiner was honored as an honorable mention All-Eastern selection by the Associated Press (AP). He was also named all-conference by his coach, first-team All-Jewish All-American by Benny Friedman, and an honorable mention All-American by the AP. In nine games played, he finished with four touchdowns scored, four extra points, and three field goals, for a total of 37 points on the season. His three field goals made tied for first nationally. At the team banquet, Weiner was named Muhlenberg's honorary captain. The Morning Call named him Muhlenberg's most outstanding all-around athlete of the year and the Reading Times described him as "the greatest developed at the Allentown institution in many years, if not all time."

After the football season, Weiner joined the basketball team for his final season there, becoming a starter at guard. He contributed to what was described that season as "the best season Muhlenberg ever had" and was named honorary captain of the team. Following the basketball season, he returned to the baseball team and was their starting catcher for the 1934 season. In May 1934, The Morning Call described him as "One of the best receivers at Muhlenberg ... not only has [he] been a consistent worker behind the bat but his hitting for the Mules has been well above the average all season." He ended the season with a batting average of .283 and was the team's leading home run hitter, with four, while the team compiled a record of 10–2. Receiving a varsity letter for his time with the 1934 baseball team, he concluded his tenure at Muhlenberg having received 10 total, in four sports. He graduated from Muhlenberg in June 1934 with a Bachelor of Philosophy degree. He was a member of the Phi Epsilon Pi fraternity.

Weiner later said that in the entirety of his high school and college football career, he only missed one game due to injury, which was a broken shoulder. His coach, John Utz, described him as "a whale of a football player who could do anything ... He was the steadying influence in our backfield."

During his time at Muhlenberg, Weiner also played for several other local baseball and basketball teams. He played for the Shore Railroad baseball team in the summer of 1932 and was noted for scoring a game-winning single in a game in July and a game-winning home run in a game in August. He also played for the local Jewish Community Center team that won the 1932 Pennsylvania championship and advanced to the national YMHA finals.

== Professional career ==
=== Football ===
==== Philadelphia Eagles ====
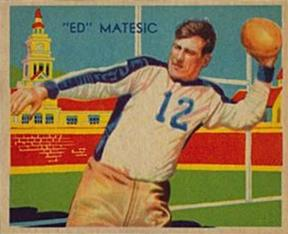
Weiner was a substitute for Ed Matesic in his professional debut

After Weiner graduated from Muhlenberg, he signed a contract to play professional football with the Philadelphia Eagles of the National Football League (NFL). He made the team and debuted in the Eagles' opener against the non-NFL Shenandoah Presidents on September 9, being a substitute for Ed Matesic and playing for a few minutes in the 8–7 win. He recorded his first statistics in NFL play in the Eagles' second 1934 NFL game, against the Pittsburgh Pirates, in which he ran for 33 yards on six carries, which was second-best on the team, and had a game-sealing interception in the fourth quarter which helped the team win 17–0. He also made one field goal in the game, from 17 yards out, which ended up being the only field goal scored by the Eagles all season. Later, on September 30, he was a major part of the team's non-league 13–0 victory against the Reading Keys; the Reading Times praised him for having won against the Keys "almost single-handed," noting he "stole the show" from more well-known Eagles players such as Swede Hanson, running for a touchdown, throwing for a touchdown and kicking an extra point.

Weiner saw his first action at quarterback for the Eagles in their 10–0 loss to the Detroit Lions on October 14, completing one of two pass attempts for zero yards, while also rushing once for two yards. Two weeks later, he was recorded as missing a field goal in the team's 17–0 loss to the New York Giants. On November 6, he played a part in the team's historic 64–0 victory over the Cincinnati Reds, in what remains the NFL's biggest regular season shutout ever. He ran twice for two yards, successfully kicked three of four extra point attempts, and completed two of four pass attempts for 40 yards and two touchdowns. Both his touchdown passes came in the fourth quarter, with one going to Joe Carter and the other to Swede Hanson. The Reds folded a few days after the game. Weiner remained the last Eagles quarterback to throw two touchdown passes on four or less attempts until Tanner McKee did so against the Dallas Cowboys in 2024. He also appeared as a substitute in the team's 10–7 loss to the Brooklyn Dodgers on November 11, but later was released on November 22. The Reading Times noted afterwards that "He had been carried as an extra back all season but was handicapped in that competition by size." He concluded his tenure with the Eagles having appeared in five games, none as a starter, while he completed three of six pass attempts for 40 yards and two touchdowns, kicked three extra points and one field goal. His one field goal tied for 10th in the NFL while his two passing touchdowns ranked sixth.

==== Later career ====
A few hours after his release from the Eagles, Weiner signed with the Reading Keys, whom he had played against earlier in the season. A report following the signing noted that "Besides being a hard running back, he is quite adept in passing and punting and will give the Keys their most valuable triple threat man." He debuted for the Keys in their 6–0 win against the Clifton Wessingtons and was noted to have "played great ball ... on both offense and defense." The next week, against the Tamaqua Professionals, he helped give the Professionals their worst loss of the season, throwing for two touchdowns, running for another and having an interception in a 20–0 win. He played against his former team, the Philadelphia Eagles, on December 9, but the Keys lost by a score of 7–0. He scored two touchdowns and had a 50-yard pass in the subsequent game, a 20–0 win against the Allentown All-Stars, and caught the game-winning 10-yard receiving touchdown in the Keys' 7–0 win against the York Pros to conclude the season.

Weiner re-signed with the Keys in August 1935, joining his brother Mickey, who had also signed with the team. He started in the season opener, a loss to the Eagles, but injured his knee in the game, an injury which he re-aggravated in the team's second game of the season, which caused him to miss time. He returned two months later, near the end of the season, playing in the team's 15–6 win against the Shenandoah Presidents and intercepting a pass; the win allowed the Keys to claim the state independent professional championship for the first time in their history.

Weiner signed with the Stapleton Buffaloes of the American Association (AA) for the 1936 season; his brother, Mickey, played for the team that year as well. While with the Buffaloes, he scored a touchdown in a non-league game against the New York Black Hawks and caught a 40-yard pass that led to a touchdown in a 7–7 tie to the Brooklyn Bay Parkways. He finished the season having appeared in six games, all as a starter, and was recorded to have converted one of two extra point attempts; other statistics are incomplete. The team finished with a record of 1–4–1, finishing fourth in their division. Weiner began the 1937 season with the New York Tigers in the AA, playing alongside his brother, but the team only lasted one game, losing to the Newark Tornadoes by a score of 20–0; he started in the game. In December, he signed to play for the Camptown Pros after an injury to one of their players. He appeared in the last game of the season, a loss to the Saracens FC, and kicked an extra point.

Weiner was set to play for a professional team in Cleveland, Ohio, but the team folded before he had the chance to play. He then returned to New Jersey and played the 1938 season there, joining the Newark Tornadoes. On October 9, 1938, he made a lateral in the fourth quarter which was run in for a game-winning touchdown in a 7–0 defeat of the Clifton Wessingtons. Three weeks later, against the Union City Rams, he ran for a touchdown and later threw a game-winning touchdown in the fourth quarter to win 14–13. He finished the season having started all seven games, kicking four extra points, running for a touchdown and throwing for another, as the Tornadoes placed fifth in the league with a record of 2–5; his passing touchdown was the team's lone of the season, and he placed second on the team in scoring with 10 total points, with only three players on the team scoring any points at all.

=== Baseball and basketball ===
In July 1934, a month after his graduation from Muhlenberg, Weiner began playing minor league baseball with the Stroudsburg Poconos. Later that month, he was signed by the St. Louis Cardinals of Major League Baseball (MLB), then sent to the Rochester Red Wings of the International League. The following month, he was sent to the Greensburg Red Wings of the Pennsylvania State Association, a Class D team. He then finished the season with the Class C Hutchinson Larks in Kansas. In January 1935, he was sent to the Huntington Red Birds of the Class C Middle Atlantic League, where he joined one of his college teammates, Horsey Heist. However, after being sent to Huntington, Weiner received a pay cut, with his salary only providing him $75 a month, and he began to complain to the team about it, which resulted in his release at the start of March 1935.

The next month, Weiner signed to be a reserve catcher for the Belmar Braves minor league team. In May 1935, he left for the Portsmouth Truckers of the Piedmont League. However, he was only used as a fill-in for an injured player with Portsmouth and was then released early in June. He continued his minor league career in 1936, joining the Allentown Brooks of the New York–Pennsylvania League in April, but was then released later that month. He later recalled that his baseball career ended due to injury: "A guy sliding home wrecked my knee. That was the end of baseball."

In addition to baseball, Weiner also played basketball for area teams.

== Coaching career ==
Weiner showed an interest in coaching while still in college, applying for the head coaching position at Pottsville High School in March 1934. He also showed an interest in an assistant coaching job at Muhlenberg in 1935, but did not receive the job. During the 1935 football season, while he was still playing for the Reading Keys, Weiner became the head coach of a team known as the Lebanon Valley Exports, made up of several top local players.

In 1936, Weiner was hired by Hillside High School in New Jersey as an assistant baseball and football coach and a teacher. As a teacher, he specifically taught algebra, trigonometry and geometry. He helped the baseball team win the Greater Newark Tournament (GNT) title when he was an assistant in 1936, and he became head baseball coach in 1937, leading them to another title that year. He was also able to develop "consistently good" football teams in his years as an assistant. He was promoted to head football coach in 1941. Also that year, he led what he later described as his greatest baseball team, as they compiled a record of 21–1, had six players selected all-state, and won the GNT tournament.

As head football coach, Weiner developed a team that won 23 consecutive games and a Group 3 title in 1942. He then had to leave his post in 1943 when he was drafted to serve in World War II, being a member of the United States Navy. While in the Navy, he held the rank of chief petty officer. He was discharged from the Navy on December 14, 1945, and returned to coaching at Hillside in 1946. By 1951, he was noted in The Star-Ledger as having led his teams to "three Union County baseball titles as well as the Group 3 titles more times than its opponents would like to admit." Through that year, his baseball teams had qualified for the GNT tournament every year but two. He was noted for having led his teams to successful seasons despite the school having a comparatively small enrollment. He won a state football championship and four sectional championships. Weiner coached his final season at Hillside in 1953.

After concluding his stint at Hillside, Weiner worked as a businessman for 12 years. In 1966, he returned to sports, becoming a football coach at a junior high school in Irvington. He was hired as the coach of the sophomore football team at Parsippany Hills High School in 1967, and lost only one game in two seasons. He then served as the coach of the freshmen from 1969 until he announced his retirement prior to the 1975 season.

== Personal life and death ==
In 1937, Weiner met Edyth Finkel, whom he described as the "prettiest girl in the State of Pennsylvania." They then married in 1938. They had three children together – two sons and a daughter. Weiner was selected to the all-time all-star team of Muhlenberg College in 1952 and was later a charter member to the school's athletic hall of fame, inducted in 1979. He was also honored by Irvington High School, which named him its greatest athlete of all time. He died on September 11, 1988, at the Jackson Memorial Hospital in Miami, Florida, at the age of 77.
