= University Elementary School =

University Elementary School may refer to:

- University Elementary School - Bloomington, Indiana - Monroe County Community School Corporation
- University Elementary School - Irvington, New Jersey - Irvington Public Schools
- University Elementary School - Spokane Valley, Washington - Central Valley School District
