= Bethlehem Bulldogs =

American Association football

Bob Sell, owner of the Bethlehem Bulldogs, in 1946

The Bethlehem Bulldogs was a professional American football team based in Bethlehem, Pennsylvania from 1946 to 1950. They played in the American Football League and were a minor league professional affiliate of the Philadelphia Eagles of the National Football League.

The Bulldogs played in the league's Western Division until the league dissolved its divisions in 1947, winning the league title in that year. They suspended operation in the middle of the 1950 season, having played just two games.

== History ==
=== Origins ===
The American Professional Football Association (AA), a professional football league established in 1936 that was suspended at the end of the 1941 season due to American entry into World War II, announced in December 1945 that it would be restarting for the 1946 season with the addition of new teams to its six previous franchises. Among these six standing teams were the Bethlehem Bulldogs, formerly the American Association's Providence, Rhode Island franchise, acquired in the spring of 1945. The franchise was owned by Bob Sell. The team borrowed its nickname from East Bethlehem High School, which also used the "Bulldogs" moniker.

The AA changed its name for its post-war restart to the American Football League (AFL) and added new franchises to its six team mix, clubs based in Scranton, Pennsylvania and Akron, Ohio. These two expansion teams were placed in a four team Western Division along with Bethlehem and the Wilmington, Delaware club, known as the Clippers.

The league signed a two-year major league/minor league agreement with the National Football League (NFL) in February 1946, agreeing to mutually respect contracts, suspensions, and territorial rights and recognizing the NFL as the only "major league" of football.

The league played under the single-platoon system, with limited substitutions and players on the field both for offense and defense.

=== 1946 season ===
An October 9, 1946 newspaper advertisement for the game between the Bulldogs and the Akron Bears

Cam Piccone, Bulldog left halfback, was a second team AFL All-League player in 1946.

Program for the Bulldogs' late 1946 exhibition game against the Washington DC Lions, a touring all-black football team. Stock cover art was often used for game programs of this era, even at the NFL level.

In March 1946, Bulldogs owner Bob Sell announced the hiring of former Philadelphia Eagles offensive lineman Enio Conti as head coach of the Bethlehem team. Conti was well acquainted with the American Association, having previously played three seasons for the league's Jersey City Giants.

In April, Sell acquired the contract of former University of Tennessee star halfback John Butler from the Philadelphia Eagles of the NFL. Butler had played three full seasons in the NFL. That the Eagles were relied upon for a player not in their present plans was unsurprising, as the Wilmington AA franchise, from whence the Bethlehem team had sprung, had previously had a major league/minor league relationship with Philadelphia. Also signed was local hero Luther Atchey, who played fullback for Bethlehem High School from 1938 to 1940.

The team opened its training camp on August 31 at Saylor's Lake in Saylorsburg, Pennsylvania, in the Pocono Mountains.

AFL teams played a ten-game schedule in 1946. The Bulldogs played their games on Wednesday nights in the stadium of Liberty High School in Bethlehem. A team band was unveiled for the September 22 opener against the Paterson Pros in addition to the 102-member Bethlehem High School marching band.

The Bulldogs were beneficiaries of an unexpected sixth home date when the Scranton Miners moved their scheduled November 10 game against Bethlehem at Scranton Stadium to Wednesday, November 6 at Liberty High Field in Bethlehem. According to Scranton Miners officials the reason for this move was financial — "to recoup, to a degree, money lost through poor attendance this season." Scranton season ticket holders were to be refunded for the lost date at the next Miners home game. The bonus home field advantage accorded the Bulldogs was all for naught, however, as Scranton pulled out a 10–7 victory on a third quarter field goal by former Penn State kicker Carl Stravinski.

An open date on the schedule during the last week of November was filled with an exhibition game against the Washington [DC] Lions — an all-African-American team which had already met the Bulldogs in the preseason, battling to a 7–7 tie in Allentown. Although now described as the "national colored champions," the visiting Lions were no match for the Bulldogs, who rolled to an easy victory by the lopsided score of 42 to 6. This Saturday night game was played at Cottingham Stadium in the neighboring town of Easton, located about ten miles east of Bethlehem.

In the final regular game of the season Bethlehem participated in the highest scoring game in American Football League history when they dropped a hard-fought game to the Akron Bears by a score of 54–30. Despite the grueling nature of this last league game, in which no fewer than five Bulldogs players suffered minor injuries, a final exhibition game was hastily scheduled for the following Saturday when the York Roses, champions of the Pennsylvania Professional League, challenged Bethlehem to a friendly match. This December 7 exhibition game was cancelled at the eleventh hour by Bethlehem, however, as most of the team's players had by then gone home for the season.

The team finished in middle of the pack for the league in their inaugural season, finishing with a record of 5 wins, 4 losses, and 1 tie — third place in the Western Division.

| Week | Date | Opponent | Result | Record | Venue | Attendance | Source |
|---|---|---|---|---|---|---|---|
| 1 | September 22 | Paterson Panthers | W 27–9 | 1–0 | Liberty High Field, Bethlehem | 8,500 | clipping |
| 2 | October 2 | Scranton Miners | T 14–14 | 1–0–1 | Liberty High Field, Bethlehem | 10,500 | clipping |
| 3 | October 9 | Akron Bears | W 30–7 | 2–0–1 | Liberty High Field, Bethlehem | 10,000 | clipping |
| 4 | October 13 | Wilmington Clippers | W 13–0 | 3–0–1 | Wilmington Park, Wilmington, DE | 4,000 | clipping |
| 5 | October 20 | Jersey City Giants | L 17–21 | 3–1–1 | Roosevelt Stadium, Jersey City, NJ | 12,000 | clipping |
| 6 | October 23 | Wilmington Clippers | W 23–20 | 4–1–1 | Liberty High Field, Bethlehem | 13,000 | clipping |
| 7 | October 30 | Newark Bombers | L 16–23 | 4–2–1 | Liberty High Field, Bethlehem | 9,000 | clipping |
| 8 | November 6 | Scranton Miners | L 10–7 | 4–3–1 | Liberty High Field, Bethlehem | 13,000 | clipping |
| 9 | November 17 | Long Island Indians | W 21–14 | 5–3–1 | Firemen's Memorial Field, Valley Stream, NY | "Less than 1,000" | clipping |
| EXHIB | November 24 | Washington Lions | W 42–6 | Exhibition | Cottingham Stadium, Easton, PA | 7,500 | clipping |
| 10 | November 28 | Akron Bears | L 30–54 | 5–4–1 | Akron Rubber Bowl, Akron, OH | 6,000 | clipping |

Attendance for the Bethlehem team was healthy, averaging about 10,600 fans per game — second highest total in the league, behind only the Eastern Division winners, Jersey City. Lefty quarterback Warren Harris finished the season going 42-for-92 passing (45.2%) for 604 yards.

In January 1947, President Joe Rosentover announced the AFL's first all-star team, as elected by the league's coaches. No Bethlehem players were elected to the 11-member first team, although 5 were named to the second team. These included center George Turner, end Bob Friedlund, fullback and placekicker John Rogalla, and halfbacks John Baronchok, and Camille Piccone.

=== 1947 season ===
Assistant coach Gauer, head coach Prendergast, general manager Heppe, and assistant coach Crum consult as 1947 training camp opens near Easton, Pennsylvania

In February 1947, the Bethlehem School Board approved a rental agreement with Bob Sell and his Bethlehem Bulldogs for the use of its 16,000-seat stadium for the 1947 season. Terms of the deal called for the school district to receive $400 for each of five scheduled league games and an additional $600 for any additional exhibition games played there.

Sell announced in March the hiring of former Bethlehem high school and Lehigh University coach Leo Prendergast as head coach of the Bulldogs for 1947, replacing Ed Conti. Already a Bethlehem resident and thus able to easily and economically assume the new position, Prendergast's contract was to run for three years. A farm team agreement with the Philadelphia Eagles was continued and former Eagles assistant general manager Hank Heppe was named as new general manager of the Bethlehem team. Advisory coach for the season was J. Birney Crum and backfield coach was Charley Gauer.

The team was bolstered in April by the resigning of star halfback and punter Camille Piccone as well as southpaw quarterback Warren Harris for the 1947 season. Piccone was secured only after legal wrangling with the Baltimore Colts of the All-America Football Conference, who attempted to lure him away while already under contract to Bethlehem. The team cleared space for a major restructuring of its roster with a major transactions which sent seven players, including starting end Cecil Pirkey, to the Paterson Panthers in exchange for an undisclosed cash amount. The Bulldogs added former LSU star halfback Bill Montgomery, who saw time with the NFL's Chicago Cardinals in 1946.

The team opened its training camp with 50 invitees on August 1 at a lighted drill grounds behind a business establishment owned by team owner Bob Sell on the Easton Pike, with two-a-day practices open to the public.

The Bulldogs booked an aggressive pre-season schedule for the 1947 campaign, including an August 22 exhibition game against the NFL's Pittsburgh Steelers in Erie (a 28–0 loss); a match against the Wilkes-Barre Barons, formerly the Scranton Miners, in Allentown on September 3 (a 34–0 victory); and a test against its own NFL affiliate, the Philadelphia Eagles, at Liberty High School Field in Bethlehem on September 17 (a wild 42–7 loss that saw four players ejected).

The schedule was lopsided, with the Bulldogs at home for five of their first six contests, concluding the season with four straight road games — necessitating a fast start if the 1947 season was to end in success. Disaster nearly struck in the home opener, with Bethlehem falling behind the visiting Long Island Indians by a score of 12 to 7 at halftime. The game turned in the third quarter with a three touchdown Bulldog outpouring, marked by reserve halfback Billy Kline breaking off a wild 80-yard run in which he reversed field twice and shook off several tacklers. Bethlehem then cruised to an easy 34–12 victory.

Kline would repeat his heroics in the second game of the year, a 4th quarter victory over the Wilkes-Barre Barons, breaking away with an 81-yard touchdown scamper.

Halfback Elliott "Buz" Ormsbee sets up a Bulldog touchdown in the 1947 championship game.

A showdown between the 3–0 Bulldogs and the 4–0 Paterson Panthers, scheduled to be held under the lights in New Jersey on October 19, was postponed due to weather. Panthers ownership stated: "The condition of the field would not have permitted the game to be played under proper conditions. Certainly the seats were much too wet for spectator comfort." The game was rescheduled for the following night, with Bethlehem emerging victorious in convincing fashion, by a score of 20 to 0.

Playing their third game in just seven days, a 243-yard passing attack by Bulldog quarterback Warren Harris rocked the visiting Wilmington Clippers 42–0 on October 22. League-leading scorer, halfback Elliott "Buz" Ormsbee, racked up three more touchdowns for Bethlehem in a laugher that was effectively over at halftime.

The Western Division crown was wrapped up in the sixth Bulldog contest in the month of October, a 13–0 win over the Jersey City Giants. This was followed by an upset loss to the cellar-dwelling Richmond Rebels, newcomers from the defunct Dixie League.

The Bulldogs got right the next week, blasting the Wilkes-Barre Barons 46 to 0, with Bethlehem's star QB Warren Harris throwing an astounding seven touchdown passes. Former University of Oklahoma end Flip McConnell was the Bulldog star, hauling down 8 passes for 116 yards and 3 touchdowns.

After a fourth quarter come-from-behind game against Newark-Bloomfield, the Bulldogs saw their season finale against the Wilmington Clippers postponed by rain that made the field unplayable, followed by cancellation when the Clippers team disbanded for the year.

Controversy swirled around the location of the league championship game, with AFL Commissioner Joseph Rosentover announcing Paterson, New Jersey, as the site of the contest. With 88 percent of proceeds earmarked for the game's players, members of the Bulldogs sought relief in court in an attempt to force the game to be played in Bethlehem's capacious 17,000-seat stadium. National Football League Commissioner Bert Bell intervened, however, having the final say in matters of dispute under the AFL charter, threatening to revoke the Bethlehem franchise if the game was not played at Paterson as scheduled. The Bulldog litigants grudgingly acceded to league demands.

| Week | Date | Opponent | Result | Record | Venue | Attendance | Source |
|---|---|---|---|---|---|---|---|
| 1 | October 1 | Long Island Indians | W 34–12 | 1 — 0 | Liberty High Field, Bethlehem | 6,500 | clipping |
| 2 | October 8 | Wilkes-Barre Barons | W 26–20 | 2 — 0 | Liberty High Field, Bethlehem | 9,000 | clipping |
| 3 | October 15 | Newark-Bloomfield Cardinals | W 43–13 | 3 — 0 | Liberty High Field, Bethlehem | 10,000 | clipping |
| 4 | October 20 | Paterson Panthers | W 20–0 | 4 — 0 | Hinchliffe Stadium, Paterson, NJ | 10,000 | clipping |
| 5 | October 22 | Wilmington Clippers | W 42–0 | 5 — 0 | Liberty High Field, Bethlehem | 11,000 | clipping |
| 6 | October 29 | Jersey City Giants | W 13–0 | 6 — 0 | Liberty High Field, Bethlehem | 11,000 | clipping |
| 7 | November 2 | Richmond Rebels | L 14–21 | 6 — 1 | City Stadium, Richmond, VA | 4,000 | clipping |
| 8 | November 9 | Wilkes-Barre Barons | W 46–0 | 7 — 1 | Artillery Park, Wilkes-Barre, PA | 3,000 | clipping |
| 9 | November 16 | Newark-Bloomfield Cardinals | W 26–7 | 8 — 1 | Bloomfield, NJ | ??? | clipping |
| 10 | November 30 | Wilmington Clippers | Cancelled | 8 — 1 | Wilmington Park, Wilmington, DE | n/a | clipping |
| EXHIB | December 2 | Vineland Senators | W 27–7 | Exhibition | Gittone Stadium, Vineland, NJ | 1,000 | clipping |
| POST | December 7 | Paterson Panthers | W 23–7 | Championship | Hinchliffe Stadium, Paterson, NJ | 10,587 | clipping |

December 7 was reserved ahead of the 1947 season as a playoff date pitting the East and West Division winners. Sudden death overtime was to be in effect, it was announced, with the time of the game moved up to 1:45 to allow extra time should the fourth quarter end with a tie score. A crowd of more than 11,000 was anticipated.

The Paterson crowd was not far short of the pregame estimate, totaling 10,587, packed into Hinchliffe Stadium to watch the home team convincingly defeated by the visitors from Pennsylvanian, 23 to 7.

Bethlehem finished at the top in league attendance for 1947, drawing an average just shy of 10,000 fans to each of its five home contests. Ominously, however, the AFL — already down to just seven teams — was seeing attendance dwindle outside of its mecca cities of Bethlehem, Paterson, and Jersey City.

The Bulldogs finished the regular season with a record of eight wins and one loss, best in the league and champions of the Western Division. For the year the Bethlehem outscored their opponents 264 to 73, pitching four shutouts while breaking the 40 point mark three times. Halfback Buz Ormsbee led the American League in rushing, with 595 yards on 101 carries (5.8 yards per carry average) with another 499 yards gained in the air on 11 catches. Ormsbee also led the league with 16 touchdowns for 96 points in 1947.

Emulating the NFL, whose season champions traditionally played a charity game against a college all-star team each year, the AFL champion Bulldogs played a New Year's Day game against a select team called the Sacramento All-Stars in Albuquerque, New Mexico. This so-called "Youth Bowl" game was no contest, with Bethlehem rolling to a one-sided triumph, 56–0. Promoter of the game, the Albuquerque Co-Op Club, absorbed a substantial loss when only 2,800 fans turned up in the rain to watch the mismatch — for which the Bulldogs collected a $6,500 guarantee and the Sacramento All-Stars another $5,000.

=== 1948 season ===
During the off-season rumors were rife that the Bethlehem Bulldogs and Wilkes-Barre Barons would join the Scranton Miners (formerly of the AFL), Allentown Buccaneers, Pottsville Maroons, and others in the Eastern Division of the Pennsylvania Pro Football League since "the American League may not be in operation this coming fall because of financial difficulties."

Reports of the league's death proved greatly exaggerated, however, as in May a 10-game schedule was announced for each of the league's six teams — the Newark-Bloomfield Cardinals having suspended operations. Affiliations of AFL teams with the National Football League would not be continued in 1948, Commissioner Joe Rosentover stated. A playoff of the league's top four teams would be held November 28 and December 5, it was announced. Still, there was an ill wind surrounding the league, with affiliations to NFL clubs ended and "drastic" salary cuts in effect around the league.

In June the team announced the resigning of former Allentown High School star Ray Dini to quarterback the team in 1948. Dini, previously employed as a backup to Warren "TD" Harris, did not play football collegiately but had signed straight out of high school in 1947 to Bethlehem. That seem month the team added former Bloomfield Cardinals QB Roy Anderson to help fill the gap left by Harris' departure to become a coach at Missouri Valley College.

Once again, the Bulldogs were scheduled to play a schedule frontloaded with Wednesday night games to start the season. Each team in the six-team league were scheduled to play each other twice, home and away, in the 1948 season.

| Week | Date | Opponent | Result | Record | Venue | Attendance | Source |
|---|---|---|---|---|---|---|---|
| 1 | September 13 | Richmond Rebels | W/L (score) | (record) | Liberty HS Stadium | (attendance) | |
| 2 | October 3 | Jersey City Giants | W/L (score) | (record) | Away | (attendance) | |
| 3 | October 6 | Wilmington Clippers | W/L (score) | (record) | Liberty HS Stadium | (attendance) | |
| 4 | October 13 | Paterson Panthers | W/L (score) | (record) | Liberty HS Stadium | (attendance) | |
| 5 | October 20 | Jersey City Giants | W/L (score) | (record) | Liberty HS Stadium | (attendance) | |
| 6 | October 24 | Richmond Rebels | W/L (score) | (record) | Away | (attendance) | |
| 7 | October 27 | Wilkes-Barre Barons | W/L (score) | (record) | Liberty HS Stadium | (attendance) | |
| 8 | November 7 | Wilkes-Barre Barons | W/L (score) | (record) | Away | (attendance) | |
| 9 | November 14 | Paterson Panthers | W/L (score) | (record) | Away | (attendance) | |
| 10 | November 21 | Wilmington Clippers | W/L (score) | (record) | Away | (attendance) | |

=== 1949 season ===
| Week | Date | Opponent | Result | Record | Venue | Attendance | Source |
|---|---|---|---|---|---|---|---|
| 1 | (date) | (opponent) | W/L (score) | (record) | (venue) | (attendance) | |
| 2 | (date) | (opponent) | W/L (score) | (record) | (venue) | (attendance) | |
| 3 | (date) | (opponent) | W/L (score) | (record) | (venue) | (attendance) | |
| 4 | (date) | (opponent) | W/L (score) | (record) | (venue) | (attendance) | |
| 5 | (date) | (opponent) | W/L (score) | (record) | (venue) | (attendance) | |
| 6 | (date) | (opponent) | W/L (score) | (record) | (venue) | (attendance) | |
| 7 | (date) | (opponent) | W/L (score) | (record) | (venue) | (attendance) | |
| 8 | (date) | (opponent) | W/L (score) | (record) | (venue) | (attendance) | |
| 9 | (date) | (opponent) | W/L (score) | (record) | (venue) | (attendance) | |
| 10 | (date) | (opponent) | W/L (score) | (record) | (venue) | (attendance) | |

=== 1950 season ===
The Bulldogs disbanded in mid-October 1950, having played (and lost) only 2 games.

| Week | Date | Opponent | Result | Record | Venue | Attendance | Source |
|---|---|---|---|---|---|---|---|
| 1 | Sept. 13, 1950 | Stapleton Stapes | W/L (score) | (record) | (venue) | (attendance) | |
| EXHIB | Sept. 23, 1950 | New York Giants (NFL) | W/L (score) | (record) | (venue) | (attendance) | |
