= Charlotte Clippers =

Charlotte Clippers may refer to

- Charlotte Clippers (EHL), later the Charlotte Checkers, a team in the Eastern Hockey League from 1956 to 1977
- Charlotte Clippers (1941–1949), an American football team originally in the Dixie League
