= Elliott Ormsbee =

American football player (1921–2010)

No. 40, 37, 42
- Position: Halfback

Personal information
- Born: September 19, 1921; Hamilton, Illinois, U.S.
- Died: December 12, 2010 (aged 89); Hot Springs, Arkansas, U.S.
- Listed height: 5 ft 11 in (1.80 m)
- Listed weight: 185 lb (84 kg)

Career information
- High school: Hamilton
- College: Bradley (1940-1942)
- NFL draft: 1944: 11th round, 102nd overall pick

Career history
- Philadelphia Eagles (1946); Bethlehem Bulldogs (1946-1948)

Career NFL statistics
- Rushing yards: 12
- Rushing average: 3
- Return yards: 5
- Stats at Pro Football Reference

Ezra Elliott "Bus" Ormsbee (September 19, 1921 – December 12, 2010) was an American professional football halfback. He played for the Philadelphia Eagles in 1946.

In 1947, Ormsbee played for the Bethlehem Bulldogs, American Football League affiliate of the Eagles. Ormsbee led the American League in rushing in that season, gaining 595 yards on 101 carries (5.8 yards per carry) with another 499 yards gained in the air on 11 catches. He also led the league in scoring in 1947, tallying 16 touchdowns for 96 points.

He died on December 12, 2010, in Hot Springs, Arkansas at age 89.
