= Bob Friedlund =

American football player (1920–1991)

No. 85
- Position: End

Personal information
- Born: January 6, 1920; Galesburg, Illinois, U.S.
- Died: August 24, 1991 (aged 71); Indian River County, Florida, U.S.
- Listed height: 6 ft 3 in (1.91 m)
- Listed weight: 210 lb (95 kg)

Career information
- High school: Schenectady (Schenectady, New York); Peekskill Military Academy (Peekskill, New York)
- College: Michigan State

Career history

Playing
- Philadelphia Eagles (1946)

Coaching
- 300th Infantry (1943) Head coach; Drake (1947–1948) Line coach; Temple (1949–1951) Line coach; Pittsburgh (1952–1954) Line coach; Sarnia Imperials (1955) Head coach; Olivet (1976) Head coach
- Stats at Pro Football Reference

Robert Memler Friedlund (January 6, 1920 – August 24, 1991) was an American football player and coach. He played college football for Michigan State from 1938 to 1941, served on General Douglas MacArthur's staff during World War II, and worked as a coach and business executive after the war.

== Early life ==
Friedlund was born in 1920 at Galesburg, Illinois. He attended Schenectady High School and the Peekskill Military Academy.

== Michigan State ==
Friedlund played college football at Michigan State College (now known as Michigan State University) from 1938 to 1941.

== Army and coaching career ==
Friedlund served in the Army during World War II. He was a liaison officer on General Douglas MacArthur's staff from 1942 to 1945. After the war, Friedlund played professional football in the National Football League (NFL) for the Philadelphia Eagles. He appeared in two games for the Eagles in 1946. before being demoted to the Eagles' American Football League affiliate, the Bethlehem Bulldogs. He appeared in eight games for Bethlehem during the 1946 season.

== Coaching and later years ==
In 1947, Friedlund was hired as an assistant football coach at Drake University.

Friedlund left coaching in the 1950s for a career in business. He held positions with General Motors Institute in Flint, Michigan, the Martin Aircraft Co. in Baltimore, Aeroquip Corp. in Jackson, Michigan, and as chairman of the product liability steering of Shea Management Corp. in Pittsburgh. He lived in Battle Creek, Michigan, from 1968 to 1984. He was an executive with Clark Equipment Co. in Battle Creek. In 1976, Friedlund returned to coaching as the head coach for Olivet. He coached for one season before resigning after a winless 0–9 campaign.

Friedlund moved to Vero Beach, Florida, in 1984. He died there in 1991.

== Head coaching record ==
Year	Team	Overall	Conference	Standing	Bowl/playoffs
300th Infantry Sabers (Independent) (1943)
1943	300th Infantry	5–3			
300th Infantry:		5–3			
Olivet Comets (Michigan Intercollegiate Athletic Association) (1976)
1976	Olivet	0–9	0–5	6th	
Olivet:		0–9	0–5		
Total:		5–12			
