= John Spirida =

American football player (1914–1966)

Profile
- Position: End

Personal information
- Born: November 4, 1914; Bridgewater, Massachusetts, U.S.
- Died: April 16, 1966 (aged 51)
- Listed height: 6 ft 0 in (1.83 m)
- Listed weight: 195 lb (88 kg)

Career information
- High school: Bridgewater (MA)
- College: St. Anselm

Career history
- Wilmington Clippers (1937); Baltimore Blue Birds (1937); Hazleton Redskins (1938); Washington Redskins (1939); Paterson Panthers (1940, 1946)
- Stats at Pro Football Reference

John Martin Spirida, Jr. (November 4, 1914 – April 16, 1966) was an American football end in the National Football League (NFL) for the Washington Redskins.

== Biography ==
A native of Bridgewater, Massachusetts, Spirida attended Bridgewater High School, and played college football for Saint Anselm College from 1933 to 1936. A fullback and kicker, Spirida was described as "a player's player," who "can do everything and do it well."

Spirida began his professional football career in 1937 playing for the Wilmington Clippers alongside teammate Vince Lombardi. In 1938, Spirida played for the Hazelton Redskins, a farm team of the Washington Redskins that was led by player-coach Ed Kahn. Spirida was called up to the Washington club for the 1939 season, and joined Pro Football Hall of Fame quarterback Sammy Baugh under Hall of Fame head coach Ray Flaherty. Spirida saw action in nine games, and the team finished the season with an 8–2–1 record. After his lone NFL campaign, Spirida played for the Paterson Panthers of the American Association in 1940.

Spirida was also a star baseball player. A burly slugger who was "always a dangerous batter," he played several summers in the Cape Cod Baseball League, and was a member of two league championship clubs. From 1935 to 1937, he played for Barnstable, the league champion in 1937. The following season, Spirida played for league champ Falmouth, and returned in 1939 to Barnstable. In 1938, he also played professionally for the Thomasville Orioles in the Georgia–Florida League, batting .280 over 30 games.

Spirida died in 1966 at age 51.
