= Hazleton Redskins =

American professional gridiron football team

General information
- Founded: September 1938
- Ended: September 18, 1939
- Stadium: Cranberry Park
- Headquartered: Hazleton, Pennsylvania

Personnel
- Head coach: Ed Kahn

League / conference affiliations
- Eastern Pennsylvania Football League

Championships
- League championships: 1 EPFL (1938)

The Hazleton Redskins were a professional American football team that played in the Eastern Pennsylvania Football League in 1938. In their single season of existence, they were named league champions after achieving a win-loss record of 5–1. The Redskins were a farm team of the Washington Redskins and wore colors very similar to that of Washington. Their team president was Dr. Frank Veneroso and their manager was Lou Reynolds.

== 1938 ==
The team's first game was against the Brooklyn Bay Parkways of the American Association. They won the game 19 to 12. Even though it was a close score, the Redskins dominated, as they had 223 yards to Brooklyn's 33. They were led by coach Ed Kahn and quarterback LeRoy "Sunshine" Campbell. The next week they won 14–0 against the Wilkes-Barre Panthers. In their third game of the season, the Redskins had their only loss, which was 0–7 against the Scranton Miners. They had more first downs, passes, rushing yards and passing yards than Scranton but could not score any points. On the final play of the game, Hazleton threw a pass which was caught at Scranton's one-yard line, but the team could not get there quick enough as the game ended. Shortly afterwards, they scheduled a rematch against Scranton, which they won 20–0. Shortly before the rematch, they had scheduled a game with the Wilmington Clippers, but it was canceled. Their next game after Scranton was a matchup with the Reading Rams. They won 19–7. On October 30, they won 32–2 against the Wilkes-Barre Panthers. In the final game of the EPFL season (and the last of the league before folding) the Redskins won 13–0 over the Shenandoah Rams (they were previously the Reading Rams, but moved before the last game of the season). On December 11, they scheduled a game against the Dixie League Champion Norfolk Shamrocks to be named "Minor-League champions" and won 16–14. On December 18, they scheduled a game against the Paterson Panthers, which was canceled.

On September 18, 1939, the team, along with the rest of the EPFL, folded.
