= Bill Montgomery (halfback) =

American football player (1923–2003)

No. 40, 43
- Position: Halfback

Personal information
- Born: June 3, 1923; Murphysboro, Illinois, U.S.
- Died: August 21, 2003 (aged 80)
- Listed height: 6 ft 0 in (1.83 m)
- Listed weight: 205 lb (93 kg)

Career information
- High school: Murphysboro
- College: LSU (1942-1943, 1945)
- NFL draft: 1945: 15th round, 151st overall pick

Career history
- Chicago Cardinals (1946); Bethlehem Bulldogs (1946-1947)

Career NFL statistics
- Rushing yards: 11
- Rushing average: 1.4
- Stats at Pro Football Reference

William N. "Bill" Montgomery (June 3, 1923 – August 21, 2003) was an American professional football player who played halfback in the National Football League (NFL) with the Chicago Cardinals for one season, in 1946. He played in three games and had eight rushing attempts for 11 yards. He attended Louisiana State University where he played college football for the LSU Tigers football team.

Montgomery signed for the 1947 season with the Bethlehem Bulldogs of the American Football League.
