= Wilkes-Barre Bullets =

Football team in America

The Wilkes-Barre Bullets were a professional football team in the American Association that played from 1948 to 1949.

In 1948, the Bullets went 1-9, finishing in last place in the six-team league.

In 1949, six games through the season, the League revoked the Bullets franchise and listed the four remaining games as forfeits. Their official record for the season 3-7, finishing fifth.
