= John J. Miller Jr. =

American politician

John Joseph Miller Jr. (October 14, 1923 – December 9, 2012) was an American Democratic Party politician who served in the New Jersey General Assembly from 1962 to 1964.

Known as Jack, he was born in the Vailsburg section of Newark, New Jersey and was a 1941 graduate of Irvington High School. He spent a year at the Newark College of Engineering (now the New Jersey Institute of Technology) before enlisting in the U.S. Navy during World War II. He served in anti-submarine patrols piloting PBY Catalinas and Venturas in South America, North Africa, and the Mediterranean, until November 1945. He received a B.A. in Economics from Fordham University and worked as an American Airlines pilot and at Hardware Mutual Insurance Co. before being recalled to active duty in the Korean War in 1952.

In 1955, he purchased a local insurance agency and renamed it the John J. Miller Agency. In addition to the Miller Agency, Jack owned and operated the Philip V. Wilder Agency in Irvington, which specialized in his dual passions: boats and airplanes.

Miller was active in community affairs, serving as vice president of the Irvington Chamber of Commerce, vice chair of the Irvington Housing Agency, and chair of the Friends of the Irvington Library. He was a member of the American Legion, the Veterans of Foreign Wars, the Knights of Columbus, and the Ancient Order of Hibernians. He was active in the Naval Reserves from 1954 until 1983, and served as commanding officer of the Naval Air Reserve Intelligence Unit at Floyd Bennett Field in Brooklyn, New York, retiring with the rank of captain.

In 1961, Miller was elected to the New Jersey General Assembly. He defeated incumbent Republican Assemblyman Philip Lindeman by a vote of 136,067 to 126,909. He lost his bid for re-election to a second term in 1963, losing to Republican James Wallwork by 2,185 votes.

Miller married the former Madelyn Stanton in September 1963. She died in September 2012 after 49 years of marriage.

When Democrats regained control of the Assembly in the 1965 elections, Miller was named Clerk of the Assembly. He became Assistant Clerk when the Republicans took the majority in 1967. He became Clerk again after Democrats won the Legislature in the 1973 election, and Assistant Clerk when Republicans took control in 1985. He was Clerk again under Democratic control after the 1989 election, and Assistant Clerk under a Republican majority after the 1991 election. He retired in 1993.
