= Philip Lindeman =

American politician

Philip Lindeman II (October 1, 1925 – December 26, 2011), was an American Republican Party politician who served in the New Jersey General Assembly from 1960 to 1962.

== Biography ==
He was born on October 1, 1925.

Lindeman was a 1948 graduate of Yale University and a 1951 graduate of Yale Law School.

He was elected to the Assembly in 1959, at the age of 34. He ran for one of 12 At-Large Essex County Assembly seats. Lindeman finished fourth in a field of 24 candidates, receiving 115,361 votes. He sought re-election to a second term in 1961, but lost to Democrat John J. Miller, Jr. by nearly 10,000 votes.

He was a partner at the Newark law form of Hellring, Lindeman, Goldstein & Siegal, LLP before retiring to Manhattan and Nantucket.

He died on December 26, 2011, and was buried at the Prospect Hill Cemetery in Nantucket.
