= Maruta Gardner =

American education administrator

- Born: Maruta Rubens; February 20, 1947
- Died: February 13, 2016 (aged 68); San Diego, California, U.S.
- Education: Parsons College; San Diego State University; University of Southern California
- Occupation: Educator
- Known for: School administration Graffiti cleanup

Maruta Rubens Gardner (February 20, 1947 – February 13, 2016) was an American community activist and public school administrator serving in the roles of teacher, vice principal, principal, and assistant superintendent of schools in San Diego County, California who has a City of San Diego half-acre park and playground named after her.

== Education and early life ==
Gardner graduated in 1965 from Irvington High School in Irvington, New Jersey. She then earned a Bachelor of Arts degree in education in 1969 from Parsons College in Fairfield, Iowa, where she served as president of the Alpha Gamma Delta sorority. Maruta received a Master of Arts in administration and supervision in 1976 from San Diego State University, and a doctorate of education in administration in 1988 from the University of Southern California.

== Career ==
Gardner worked for 38 years in public education, teaching school before becoming an administrator, vice principal, a principal at Mission Bay High School, assistant superintendent of the Poway Unified School District, and an instructional leader at the Institute for Learning at San Diego Unified School District. When Gardner retired in 2008, she was the executive director of the San Diego County Office of Education, Juvenile Court and Community Schools.

== Community work ==
Gardner, beginning in 1990, chaired the Mission Beach Town Council's Graffiti Patrol. Before painting over graffiti in the beach area, Gardner would take photos and then send them to the San Diego Police Department's gang unit so officers could identify the gangs to which the graffiti was tied. The police department deputized her and gave her an honorary badge, making her graffiti-abatement role official. For more than 20 years, Gardner, riding a three-wheeled bicycle, hauled supplies and paint as she pedaled to different spots in the beach area to paint over graffiti in an effort to improve the community. Gardner also was a former president of the Mission Beach Women's Club. At the time of her death, Gardner sat on the City of San Diego's Consolidated Plan Advisory Board.

=== Fatal crash ===
Gardner died from a severe head injury in February 2016 in what police called a road rage-fueled hit-and-run crash by a drunken driver as Gardner removed graffiti from a beach wall. The driver, Jonathan Domingo Garcia, 23, was charged with gross vehicular manslaughter while intoxicated and felony hit-and-run. He pleaded guilty in June to gross vehicular manslaughter while intoxicated and was sentenced in 2016 to 11 years in a California State Prison.

== Recognition ==
Three months before Gardner's unexpected death, the City of San Diego in 2015 declared November 3 as Maruta Gardner Day in recognition of Gardner's years of service to the community through the Mission Beach Women's Club, for her graffiti eradication work in the Mission Beach and Pacific Beach communities, and for her efforts through the woman's club to upgrade a playground at Bonita Cove, Mission Beach, through the "Play by the Bay" fundraising effort.

Every November 3 since Gardner's death, residents participate in a beach cleanup as a continuing memorial to her and to honor her dedication to community service.

A large mural, painted on a Mission Bay High School wall by artist John Vallas, was unveiled in Gardner's memory in 2017.

A year after Gardner's death, the City of San Diego began giving an annual Maruta Gardner Excellence in Volunteering Award, presented to a volunteer by a councilmember.

=== Maruta Gardner Playground ===
San Diego Mayor Kevin Faulconer, at a November 2019 groundbreaking of a $3.4 million renovation of the playground at Mission Bay Park, officially renamed the Bonita Cove Playground after Gardner. The renovated half-acre Maruta Gardner Playground was dedicated by the City of San Diego on Nov. 20, 2020.

A bronze plaque with Gardner's image was installed at the playground on January 10, 2024.

=== Scholarship ===
In 2017, Gardner's Irvington High School class of 1965 designated funds for a Maruta Rubens Gardner Scholarship, which was awarded in a ceremony to graduating senior Ashley Moreno.

=== Awards ===
- Outstanding Educator by the Association of California School Administrators 1988-1989
- Distinguished Leader by the San Diego Administrators Association 1989-1990 and 2005-2006
- Administrator of the Year in 1990 by the Council of Exceptional Children
- Woman of Achievement in 2001 by the San Diego Council of Administrative Women in Education
- Tribute to Women and Industry Honoree 2005
- Volunteer of the Year 2003 by the Mission Beach Town Council

== Personal life ==
Gardner was married for 50 years to William Gardner, and the couple resided in Mission Beach.
