= Dixie League (American football) =

Historical professional football league in United States

- Sport: American football
- Founded: 1936
- First season: 1936
- Last season: 1947
- Folded: 1947
- Claim to fame: highest level pre-World War II minor football league
- No. of teams: 5 (1936–1937, 1940–1947), 6 (1938–1939)
- Last champion: Charlotte Clippers

The "Dixie League" was a professional American football minor league founded in 1936 originally as the "South Atlantic Football Association", with six charter member teams in the Middle Atlantic states of Maryland, Virginia, and Washington, D.C. Like the American Association (nicknamed the 'A.A.', which was another minor league in pro football that formed in 1936, (not to be confused with another "American Association", an early famous major league baseball group from 1881 to 1892), its popularity (and attendance) rivaled that of another earlier established "major league" grouping, the National Football League of 1922 (originally the "American Professional Football Conference" formed in 1920, later quickly renamed "American Professional Football Association"). Unlike most professional football minor leagues, the "Dixie League" had a relative stability in membership during the "Great Depression" in the years prior to World War II, maintaining a five or six-team lineup membership of franchises (and adding a team in North Carolina upon the demise of their Washington team franchise in 1941).

Like the competitor 'AA' and the third "American Football League", the "Dixie League" suspended operations after the Pearl Harbor attack by Japan, on the "Day of Infamy" – Sunday, December 7, 1941; unlike the AFL, the football minor league reorganized after the end of the War and resumed competition in the first post-war season year of 1946. The following year, the 'D.L.' collapsed when one of its member teams purchased the assets of a defunct team in the other pro football minor loop, the "American Association" (which then changed its name to the "American Football League" in 1946) and opted to jump leagues.

== Origin ==
The "Dixie League" began its existence in 1936 when six independent teams joined forces for the purposes of competition. Charter members included the Maryland Athletic Club (which moved to Washington, D.C. in 1936 to become the Washington Pros), the Baltimore Orioles (also known sometimes as the Baltimore Blue Jays, but no relation to the later major league "Orioles" baseball team in the American League, (1954 to present), Norfolk Clancys, Richmond Arrows, Portsmouth Cubs, and the Alexandria Celtics (the last was a "traveling team" with no regular home city). Charles Hamilton became the new "Dixie League's" first president.

Although the new League officially called itself at first, the "South Atlantic Football League" in its first year of existence, various sportswriters repeatedly unofficially called it the "Dixie League." The name was officially adopted for the second 1937 pro season.

== 1936 ==
Like the New York Yankees pro football team of the first "American Football League", the Richmond Arrows provided the financial backbone of the Dixie League in its first year, averaging twice as many paying spectators per home game as the other league members. The Arrows played all their games at home, offering the visiting teams a five percent bonus for the privilege. On November 15, 1936, Richmond's team coach (Dave Miller) and the players walked off the team in an effort for more pay. Richmond manager Blair Meaney, Jr. hired a new head coach (Bob Burdette) and new players (to join the five who didn't strike) to finish the season.

Baltimore's Ted Wright led the scoring, while the Orioles/Blue Jays also featured the League's top passer, Leroy "Sunshine" Campbell. Until the player strike, back Mush DeLotto provided an explosive running game for the Richmond Arrows.

| Team | W | L | T | Pct. | PF | PA |
|---|---|---|---|---|---|---|
| Washington Pros | 6 | 3 | 2 | .667 | 66 | 47 |
| Richmond Arrows | 4 | 3 | 3 | .571 | 61 | 43 |
| Baltimore Orioles (Baltimore Blue Jays) | 4 | 4 | 2 | .500 | 97 | 85 |
| Portsmouth Cubs | 4 | 5 | 2 | .444 | 71 | 82 |
| Norfolk Clancys | 3 | 4 | 2 | .429 | 56 | 69 |
| Alexandria Celtics | 3 | 5 | 1 | .375 | 41 | 66 |

"Playoffs": Washington defeated Richmond; Baltimore defeated Alexandria
"Championship": Washington beat Baltimore, 3–0, on a Willis Brenner field goal with 13 seconds left in regulation.

Fourth-place finisher Portsmouth declined to participate in the playoffs, opting for a game against nearby rival Norfolk. Despite finishing in last place, Alexandria took Portsmouth's place against Baltimore.

In the first game of a series between the 'D.L.' champion and the winners of the American Association, the Washington Pros (Dixie League) defeated the Brooklyn Bay Parkways (American Association) 13–6 in Richmond, Virginia, January 1, 1937. While there would be more exhibition games involving members of the two leagues, this was the last time that an "American Association" team lost to a team in the "Dixie League" on the gridiron.

== 1937 ==
Compared to most sporting leagues in their beginning years, the "Dixie League" had begun strongly. All six charter members were in strong enough shape to compete in a second season (three of the six remained 'D.L.' members from the 1936 beginning to the aborted 1947 season).

Richmond was still recovering from the effects of the player rebellion when the strikers formed a new team, the Richmond Rebels, and tried to replace the Arrows in the league. After being rebuffed, the Rebels tried to compete against the Arrows by forming the "Virginia-Carolina Football League" and then marched through the season undefeated. The 'V-CFL' lasted only the 1937 season; the Rebels folded along with the league.

Despite the competition from the Rebels, the Arrows held their own, both on the field and at the turnstiles with their fans. Despite their improved record, the Arrows could finish no higher than third place, behind the undefeated defending champion Washington (which became the Presidents) and the newly rechristened Baltimore Blue Jays or Blue Birds.

| Team | W | L | T | Pct. | PF | PA |
|---|---|---|---|---|---|---|
| Washington Presidents | 5 | 0 | 2 | 1.000 | 53 | 20 |
| Baltimore Blue Jays (or Blue Birds) | 5 | 1 | 1 | .833 | 89 | 18 |
| Richmond Arrows | 6 | 2 | 1 | .750 | 90 | 28 |
| Alexandria Celtics | 2 | 5 | 0 | .286 | 30 | 63 |
| Norfolk Clancys | 1 | 5 | 1 | .167 | 34 | 112 |
| Portsmouth Cubs | 0 | 6 | 1 | .000 | 20 | 75 |

Championship: no playoffs – Washington clinches title on 3–3 tie with Baltimore

While the league featured balance from top to bottom in its maiden season, it clearly divided into the "haves" and "have nots" in 1937. Five members of the Washington Presidents (including backfield mates Tom Oliver and Gene Augusterfer) were named to the all league team. Baltimore's Ted Wright was once again the league's leading scorer while teammate "Sunshine" Campbell dented defenses with his passes. Richmond placed three linemen on the all league team, including league most valuable player Lyle Graham. The winless Portsmouth team had a future team member of the Pro Football Hall of Fame in Canton, Ohio on its roster, player-coach "Ace" Parker, who played in only one game for the Cubs before he signed with the NFL's Brooklyn Dodgers team in early November.

== 1938 ==
After two years of stability, the "Dixie League" made some adjustments in 1938. William Nickels, Jr. became the league's second president, replacing Charles Hamilton. The DL was forced to play with only five teams after the folding of the Baltimore Blue Jays/Blue Birds, and the Washington Patriots minor league squad became a traveling team (having been upstaged by the NFL's former Boston Braves, later renamed the Boston Redskins later becoming the Washington Redskins and the League's entry into the District of Columbia, the Nation's Capital, the year before) under owner George Preston Marshall.

A. E. Stutz, the founder and owner of the Norfolk Clancys, died in late 1937; in 1938, new owner Harry Howren started stockpiling talent (including back Mush DeLotto, formerly of Richmond), sufficient for the newly renamed the "Shamrocks" to dominate League play that year. Another Shamrock player, tackle Vernon "Buck" Miles, was named the league's most valuable player at the end of the season.

The Portsmouth Cubs, winless in 1937, reached .500 in 1938 as quarterback Larry Weldon led the League in scoring.

| Team | W | L | T | Pct. | PF | PA |
|---|---|---|---|---|---|---|
| Norfolk Shamrocks | 5 | 1 | 1 | .833 | 59 | 30 |
| Richmond Arrows | 5 | 3 | 0 | .625 | 81 | 38 |
| Portsmouth Cubs | 4 | 4 | 0 | .500 | 96 | 86 |
| Washington Patriots | 1 | 3 | 1 | .250 | 27 | 50 |
| Alexandria Celtics | 1 | 5 | 0 | .167 | 42 | 101 |

"No playoffs": Norfolk was declared league champions

After the season, Norfolk was defeated 16–14 by the Hazelton Redskins, of Pennsylvania, champions of the Eastern Pennsylvania Football League in a game for the "National Minor League title". Two members of the 1937 Baltimore Blue Jays/Blue Birds ("Sunshine" Campbell and John Spirida) provided the difference in the game, with Campbell throwing two touchdown passes and Spirida scoring ten points in the game.

== 1939 ==
The number of traveling teams in the "Dixie League" was halved with the folding of the Alexandria Celtics team in Virginia. The number of league members stayed at five with the entrance of the Newport News Builders, which actually played its home games in neighboring Hampton southeast of Newport News on the Virginia Peninsula.

“Buck” Miles became the league "M.V.P." as he repeated his feat of scoring the most points in the "Dixie League". His Cubs finished the season in a tie for the league lead with the Richmond Arrows (the Cubs had a 6–1 record, the Arrows 6–1–1). For the last game, the Cubs added Ace Parker (after he finished an All-Pro season with the NFL's team, the Brooklyn Dodgers). He scored the only touchdown in a 7–0 Cubs victory over Newport News Builders to force a playoff with the Richmond Arrows for the league championship (in which Parker scores the only touchdown in a Cubs 7–0 win).

| Team | W | L | T | Pct. | PF | PA |
|---|---|---|---|---|---|---|
| Richmond Arrows | 6 | 1 | 1 | .833 | 77 | 31 |
| Portsmouth Cubs | 6 | 1 | 0 | .833 | 79 | 42 |
| Newport News Builders | 2 | 4 | 1 | .333 | 45 | 47 |
| Washington Presidents | 2 | 4 | 1 | .333 | 43 | 62 |
| Norfolk Shamrocks | 0 | 6 | 1 | .286 | 34 | 96 |

Playoff: Portsmouth 7, Richmond 0 – Portsmouth wins league championship

== 1940 ==
With the addition of the Roanoke Travelers, the "Dixie League" returned to having six teams for the 1940 season. While the team made a successful debut, finishing in second place, the Travelers had the misfortune of having almost half of its season canceled as a result of bad weather.

Two early losses deprived Richmond of a chance for competing for the league title (which was easily won by Portsmouth), but the Arrows entertained the fans by being the first 'D.L.' team to average more than two touchdowns a game. "Sunshine" Campbell, returning to the Dixie League after playing in the American Association and the E.P.F.L., provided the passes, and A. B. Conner became the "M.V.P." of the "Dixie League" by scoring 49 points.

Portsmouth's Larry Weldon set a new league record by throwing seven touchdown passes in the span of ten games. Over a span of 20 games in 1939 and 1940, Weldon and the Cubs won 16 games, lose two, and tie two games (a .889 winning percentage) – and win two league titles.

Washington's Presidents struggled through its third consecutive season as a "traveling team", and left the League after the end of the 1940 season.

| Team | W | L | T | Pct. | PF | PA |
|---|---|---|---|---|---|---|
| Portsmouth Cubs | 8 | 1 | 1 | .889 | 101 | 51 |
| Roanoke Travelers | 4 | 2 | 0 | .667 | 55 | 58 |
| Richmond Arrows | 5 | 4 | 0 | .556 | 155 | 69 |
| Washington Presidents | 2 | 3 | 2 | .400 | 47 | 99 |
| Norfolk Shamrocks | 3 | 6 | 1 | .333 | 73 | 105 |
| Newport News Builders | 1 | 7 | 0 | .200 | 43 | 92 |

No playoffs: Portsmouth declared league champions for the second straight year.

== 1941 ==
For the first time, the "Dixie League" had six teams with actual home fields, with the Charlotte Clippers of Charlotte in North Carolina replacing Washington. As the United States started preparing for a war with the "Axis powers", (Nazi Germany, Fascist Italy, and Imperial Japan) that appeared to be inevitable in the fall of 1941, the League benefited from the addition of military personnel from bases in the region.

Playing for the Newport News Builders, two such newcomers broke passing and scoring records that were established just the previous year. George Cafego had eight of his passes go for touchdowns, while Ken Fryer scored 61 points, more than any minor league player in a single season before the entry of the U.S. into World War II. Despite the records on offense, the Builders finished the 1941 season in third place.

Charlotte had a successful freshman season in the "Dixie League", scoring 184 points, roughly 30 more than Newport News and Norfolk... and the previous record set in 1940 by Richmond. The Clippers finished second to Norfolk, whose star back Pete Sachon was billed as "Pistol Pete" three decades before Pete Maravich. "Pistol Pete" Sachon was selected the 'D.L.' most valuable player for 1941.

| Team | W | L | T | Pct. | PF | PA |
|---|---|---|---|---|---|---|
| Norfolk Shamrocks | 7 | 1 | 2 | .875 | 156 | 58 |
| Charlotte Clippers | 7 | 3 | 0 | .700 | 184 | 76 |
| Newport News Builders | 6 | 3 | 1 | .667 | 158 | 87 |
| Richmond Arrows | 4 | 5 | 1 | .444 | 63 | 132 |
| Portsmouth Cubs | 3 | 7 | 0 | .300 | 60 | 163 |
| Roanoke Travelers | 1 | 9 | 0 | .100 | 42 | 147 |

No playoffs: Norfolk declared league champion

== 1942–1946 ==
Like two other professional football leagues – the "American Association" and the third "American Football League" – the "Dixie League" suspended its operations in early 1942 in the wake of the December 7, 1941 Pearl Harbor attack and the U.S. entry into World War II. The League stayed in limbo until 1946. As American troops returned to the homefront in the United States after the end of World War II, the owners of the "Dixie League" member teams, led by Howren, announced plans for "reorganizing" the League. With the exception of Roanoke (which was replaced by a team from Greensboro), the "Dixie League" of 1946 resembled the 'D.L.' of five years earlier, although a couple of members (Richmond and Portsmouth) opted for changes in their team names. William Nickels, Jr. continued as the League president.

While the league opted to maintain continuity on the playing field, the "Dixie League" joined forces with the "American Association" (which now had changed its name in 1946 to the (third) third "American Football League") along with the far western Pacific Coast Professional Football League. On March 24, 1946, P.C.P.F.L. president J. Rufus Klawans announced the "Big Three" of the U.S.A.'s pro football's minor leagues had formed the coordinating "Association of Professional Football Leagues". The new A.P.F.L. entered into a working compact with the NFL, prohibiting the participation of players signed to "outlaw leagues" (originally directed toward the third AFL – which never returned from "its" limbo – but was subsequently applied to the now newly formed pro football "major league" competitor to the old National Football League, known as the "All-America Football Conference" of 1946–1949 which competed with the older pro football loop). The new coordinating Association however, lasted less than two years.

=== Virginia Football League (1942) ===
Norfolk Shamrocks owner Harry Howren disagreed with the decision of the League (and getting inspiration from 32nd President Franklin D. Roosevelt, who was quoted as saying that it would be good if the national baseball and football leagues were able to continue to play some games of their seasons, giving inspiration and entertainment to weary war-workers) and opted to form the "Virginia Football League" for the 1942 season with 'D.L.' member teams Portsmouth, Newport News, and Richmond. The plans were short-lived as Newport News failed to field a team and the other three teams played only a few games before competition was canceled due to lack of spectator interest (or else the extremely high work-load in the numerous local defense plants and shipyards just getting started up to speed in the War's first year).

==== Games ====
Richmond Rockets 32 vs. Portsmouth Cubs 18 (October 11, 1942 in Richmond, VA)
Norfolk Shamrocks 17 vs. Richmond Rockets 0 (October 18, 1942 in Greensboro, NC)
Richmond Rockets 33 vs. Portsmouth Cubs 6 (October 27, 1942 in Norfolk, VA)
Richmond Rockets 19 vs. Norfolk Shamrock 26 (November 1, 1942 in Richmond, VA)

The Rockets played an exhibition game in City Stadium against the "Norfolk Soldiers" (won 54–6), while the Shamrocks finished the season in a benefit exhibition game against Camp Lee soldiers (won 24–7) that drew 12,500 spectators.

== 1946 ==
The new "working relationship" that the "Big Three" minor leagues and the older "major league" NFL reaped positive benefits for the "Dixie League" as the 'D.L.' teams lined up various "sponsors" with team franchises in the major pro football league. While both "Dixie League" and AFL teams acted as "farm system teams" for their big league "sponsors," rules were in place to prevent the stockpiling of talent for later use by the old NFL. As a result, the major pro league teams were not permitted to "raid" their minor league brethren, and the quality of play, and the players, was a step-up compared to before World War II.

In addition to the new Greensboro franchise, the "Dixie League" of 1946 had two charter members change their names. The former Portsmouth Cubs became the Portsmouth Pirates, while the former Richmond Arrows adopted a familiar old name: the Richmond Rebels.

The 1946 "Dixie League" campaign featured a tight race between two teams with potent offenses, the Charlotte Clippers (with backs Casey Jones and Butch Butler) and Richmond (with backs Glenn Knox and Tony Gallovich). League records for offense fell as Butler threw 11 touchdown passes and Richmond's Morgan Tiller had eight touchdown receptions. The two teams were even in their battle for the league title until the Rebels lost their final two games.

The "Dixie League" had a successful revival in 1946. No one could have foreseen its sudden demise a mere one year later.

| Team | W | L | T | Pct. | PF | PA |
|---|---|---|---|---|---|---|
| Charlotte Clippers | 9 | 1 | 0 | .900 | 196 | 83 |
| Richmond Rebels | 7 | 3 | 0 | .700 | 177 | 73 |
| Norfolk Shamrocks | 5 | 5 | 0 | .500 | 131 | 155 |
| Portsmouth Pirates | 4 | 6 | 0 | .400 | 102 | 195 |
| Greensboro Patriots | 4 | 6 | 0 | .400 | 124 | 178 |
| Newport News Builders | 1 | 9 | 0 | .100 | 53 | 219 |

No playoffs: Charlotte declared Dixie League champions

== 1947 and the demise of the "Dixie League" ==
After a successful post-war revival in 1946, the "Dixie League" prepared for a season of change in 1947. It inaugurated a new president, Tom Hanes. The Greensboro Patriots moved to Winston-Salem, while the Roanoke Travelers returned to the fold, replacing the defunct Newport News franchise. Plans for possible expansion were being made for the 1948 season.

The optimism of the League for its new season started to disappear just before the first week of competition. Both Winston-Salem and Roanoke withdrew, suddenly leaving the "Dixie League" with a mere four teams. The week after the "Opening Day", (October 5, 1947) games, the League suddenly announced that it was suspending operations for the 1947 season.

| Team | W | L | T | Pct. | PF | PA |
|---|---|---|---|---|---|---|
| Richmond Rebels | 1 | 0 | 0 | 1.000 | 21 | 13 |
| Norfolk Shamrocks | 1 | 0 | 0 | 1.000 | 7 | 3 |
| Charlotte Clippers | 0 | 1 | 0 | .000 | 13 | 21 |
| Portsmouth Pirates | 0 | 1 | 0 | .000 | 3 | 7 |

On October 7, 1947, control of the Portsmouth Pirates was transferred from an ailing Charles Aberson to a group based in Charlottesville, with the agreement that the team would revert to Aberson in 1948. The next day, the League was blindsided by the announcement that longtime 'D.L.' member team, Richmond had purchased the assets of a defunct "American Football League" (former "American Association") franchise, (the Long Island Indians, which lost all three games they played that season) and defected to the other minor league.

The move inflicted a fatal wound to the "Dixie League". A month earlier, the Dixie's had six members ready for competition; after the Richmond defection, only three teams remained. The League was forced to call it quits a day after. Dixie League president Tom Hanes protested to NFL president Bert Bell, but since it didn’t involve any member team of the National Football League, he – and the Association of American Professional Football Leagues – could do nothing about it since the agreement didn't include terms of territorial rights between minor leagues and their teams.

While there were discussions of a possible reorganization for a season in 1948, the "Dixie League" was no longer a viable entity. The Charlotte Clippers continued through 1949 as an independent team, while members of the Portsmouth Pirates and Norfolk Shamrocks combined forces to also test the waters of independence competition in 1948.

The Richmond Rebels, "Dixie League" charter members like Portsmouth and Norfolk, continued their participation in the American Football League of 1946 until that league had "its" later implosion in 1950 (the Rebels won the last two AFL championships, in 1949 and 1950). The team petitioned to join the competing major league, the new "All-America Football Conference" for their fourth 1950 season, but the A.A.F.C. – major league's pending merger negotiations and later agreement with the old National Football League of 1920/1922 thwarted the club's intentions.

== Virginia Negro Football League ==
In 1946 four Virginia teams formed an all-black league, making it in essence a scaled-down black version of the segregated Dixie League. The league lasted only one season, and most remembered by the fact that they played also against local historically black colleges and universities (HBCUs): Virginia Union, Virginia State and Norfolk State.

Fred Cooper from the Richmond Rams would later become the first black player of the Richmond Rebels in 1949, after they moved to the AFL.

| Team | W | L | T | Pct. | PF | PA |
|---|---|---|---|---|---|---|
| Richmond Rams | 4 | 0 | 1 | 1.000 | 58 | 14 |
| Norfolk Brown Bombers | 3 | 1 | 1 | .750 | 44 | 16 |
| Newport News Lighthearts | 1 | 4 | 0 | .200 | 29 | 70 |
| Portsmouth Swans | 1 | 4 | 0 | .200 | 27 | 58 |

No playoffs: Richmond declared League champions after beating out Norfolk. The teams would later play a "Post-season exhibition game" in Greensboro, NC to a 0–0 tie.

== See also ==
- Pacific Coast Professional Football League
- American Association (American football)
