= Nate Robinson (American football) =

American gridiron football player (born 1985)

Profile
- Position: Defensive tackle

Personal information
- Born: January 18, 1985 (age 41); Irvington, New Jersey
- Listed height: 6 ft 4 in (1.93 m)
- Listed weight: 320 lb (145 kg)

Career information
- High school: Irvington (NJ)
- College: Akron
- NFL draft: 2008: undrafted

Career history
- New York Giants (2008)*; New York Jets (2009)*; New York Sentinels (2009)*; Toronto Argonauts (2011)*
- * Offseason or practice squad member only

Nathaniel Robinson (born January 18, 1985) is an American former football defensive tackle. He was signed by the New York Giants as an undrafted free agent in 2008. Once a heralded high school athlete, Robinson was an underachiever during his college football career at Rutgers and Akron.

== Early life ==
A native of Irvington, New Jersey, Robinson attended Irvington High School, a school that struggled with gang-related violence. As a junior in 2001, he recorded 82 tackles, including 17 tackles for loss, as well as 14 quarterback sacks, nine pass deflections and six caused fumbles. He missed most of his senior season due to a knee injury, but was still rated one of the best defensive lineman in the nation. In fact, Rivals.com gave Robinson their only five-star rating among defensive tackles, and ranked him No. 1 in a class that also included Sedrick Ellis, Marcus Thomas, and Fili Moala.

After official visits to Rutgers, Syracuse, and Miami (FL), Robinson committed to the Hurricanes, together with the only other five-star recruit from New Jersey, Greg Olsen of Wayne Hills. Unlike Olsen, however, Robinson was unable to meet the school's academic qualification standards. Although Robinson's SAT score of 800 met the NCAA minimum for high school students with a 3.0 grade point average, it was 20 points shy of Miami's institutional standard. With the perspective of being declared ineligible, Robinson decided to not enroll at Miami, and instead went to Rutgers. He was the only four- or five-star recruit in Rutgers' class.

== College career ==
The injury from his high school senior year also caused Robinson to miss the first half of his true freshman year at Rutgers. He only saw action in the final six games of the season, and recorded a total of three tackles and a single quarterback sack—coincidentally against the Miami Hurricanes. In his sophomore year, Robinson played in eight of 11 games, including the final six contests, finishing the season with 15 tackles, including five solo stops. In April 2005, he was dismissed for violation of team policy, and eventually transferred to Akron.

After sitting out the 2005 season while fulfilling NCAA transfer requirements, Robinson played 11 of 12 games for the Akron Zips in 2006. He had 23 tackles, including six for losses with a sack. In his senior year, he was moved in and out of the lineup, registering 26 tackles, including five for a loss, for the season.

== Professional career ==
=== 2008 NFL draft ===
After a disappointing college career, Robinson was projected to go undrafted in the 2008 NFL draft. After doing so, he was signed as an undrafted free agent by the Giants.

=== New York Sentinels ===
Robinson was signed by the New York Sentinels of the United Football League on September 9, 2009. He was released before the season began.

=== Toronto Argonauts ===
On April 4, 2011, Robinson signed with the Toronto Argonauts of the Canadian Football League. He was released by the Argonauts on June 15, 2011.

== Personal ==
On December 26, 2013, Robinson was arrested on gun and drug charges in Newark, New Jersey.
