= Irvington High School (New Jersey) =

High school in Essex County, New Jersey, US

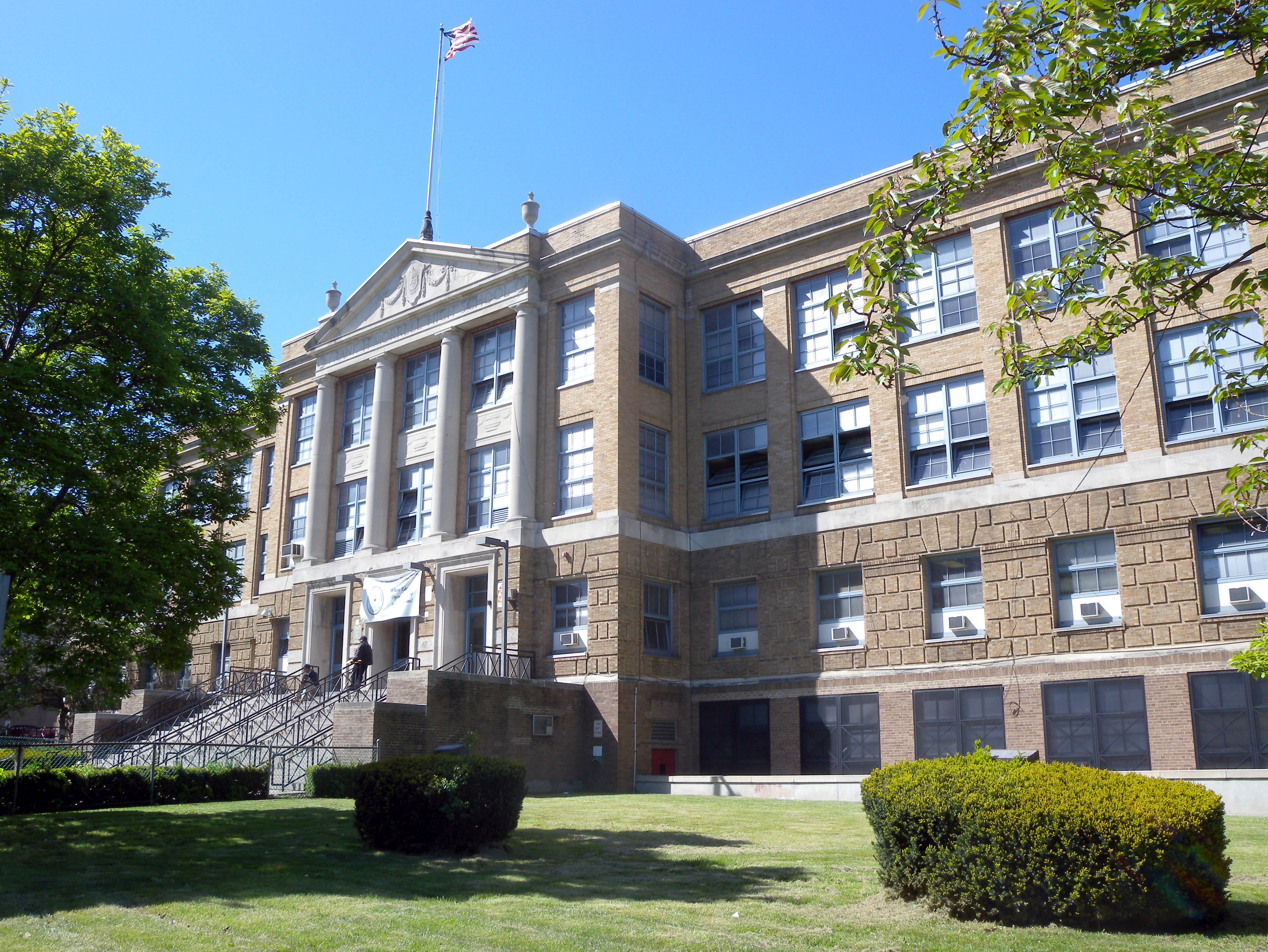
- Irvington High School in April 2010

Location
- 1253 Clinton Avenue; Irvington, Essex County, New Jersey 07111; United States; 40.728822°N 74.233985°W

Information
- Type: Public high school
- Established: 1926
- School district: Irvington Public Schools
- NCES School ID: 340768002104
- Principal: Darnel Mangan
- Faculty: 126.5 FTEs
- Grades: 9–12
- Enrollment: 1,913 (as of 2024–25)
- Student to teacher ratio: 15.1:1
- Colors: Navy blue and white
- Athletics conference: Super Essex Conference (general); North Jersey Super Football Conference (football)
- Team name: Blue Knights
- Accreditation: Middle States Association of Colleges and Schools
- Newspaper: Knightline
- Website: irvington.k12.nj.us/schools/irvington-high-school/

Irvington High School is a four-year comprehensive community public high school in Irvington, in Essex County, in the U.S. state of New Jersey, that serves students in ninth through twelfth grades, as the lone secondary school of the Irvington Public Schools. IHS has three main floors and a basement, with each floor holding up to 23 classrooms. A west wing of the building was erected in the 1970s. The school is accredited by the Middle States Association of Colleges and Schools Commission on Elementary and Secondary Schools through July 2027.

As of the 2024–25 school year, the school had an enrollment of 1,913 students and 126.5 classroom teachers (on an FTE basis), for a student–teacher ratio of 15.1:1. There were 1,121 students (58.6% of enrollment) eligible for free lunch and 75 (3.9% of students) eligible for reduced-cost lunch.

== History ==
Before Frank H. Morrell High School was completed in 1926, the district's high school program was housed at Madison Avenue School.

== Awards, recognition and rankings ==
The school was the 331st-ranked public high school in New Jersey out of 339 schools statewide in New Jersey Monthly magazine's September 2014 cover story on the state's "Top Public High Schools", using a new ranking methodology. The school had been ranked 309th in the state of 328 schools in 2012, after being ranked 287th in 2010 out of 322 schools listed. The magazine ranked the school 307th in 2008 out of 316 schools. The school was bottom-ranked, 316th, in the magazine's September 2006 issue, which surveyed 316 schools across the state.

== Extracurricular programs ==
Irvington High School's Crusader Battalion is the oldest Junior Reserve Officers' Training Corps (JROTC) program in the state of New Jersey. Approximately 200 students participate in the program, of whom one third will continue on to enlist in the military, while the remaining two-thirds will move on to college or a job after graduation.

=== Athletics ===
The Irvington High School Blue Knights compete in the Super Essex Conference, which is comprised of public and private high schools in Essex County and operates under the supervision of the New Jersey State Interscholastic Athletic Association (NJSIAA). Prior to the 2010 reorganization, the school had competed in the Watchung Conference, which consisted of public and private high schools in Essex County, Hudson County and Union County in northern New Jersey. With 1,058 students in grades 10-12, the school was classified by the NJSIAA for the 2019–20 school year as Group III for most athletic competition purposes, which included schools with an enrollment of 761 to 1,058 students in that grade range. The football team competes in the Liberty Red division of the North Jersey Super Football Conference, which includes 112 schools competing in 20 divisions, making it the nation's biggest football-only high school sports league. The school was classified by the NJSIAA as Group V North for football for 2024–2026, which included schools with 1,317 to 5,409 students.

The baseball team won the Greater Newark Tournament in 1933, 1938-1940 and 1947. The program's five titles are the fourth-most in tournament history.

The girls' basketball team won the Group IV state championship in 1985 (defeating Washington Township High School in the tournament final) and 1986 (vs. Hightstown High School). The 1985 team won the Group IV title with a 58-53 win against Washington Township in the championship game played at the Brendan Byrne Arena. The 1986 team finished the season at 27-4 after winning their second straight Group IV title with a 71-61 win against Hightstown in the championship game played at the Rutgers Athletic Center. The 1985 and 1986 team roster included Tammy Hammond, who was named the 1986 USA Today National High School Player of the Year, and Dana Owens, who is known today as actress and singer, Queen Latifah.

The boys' basketball team won the Group IV state championship in 1993 (defeating runner-up Shawnee High School in the tournament final) and was declared as winner of the North III regional in 2020, after the group finals had been canceled due to COVID. The 1993 team won the Group IV title with a 71-67 win against Shawnee in the tournament final.

The boys' track team won the Group III indoor track championship in 2008 (as co-champion). The team won the Group III indoor relay state championship in 2009 (as co-champion with West Windsor-Plainsboro High School North) and the girls track team won the Group III title in 2012 (also as co-champion with West Windsor-Plainsboro High School North).

The football team won their first sectional championship in 2021 after defeating Middletown High School South in the North II Group IV tournament finals and won the 2021 North Group IV regional championship after beating previously undefeated Northern Highlands by a score of 19-14 to finish the season with a record of 11-2.

The 2022 girls' flag football team won the high school state championship with a 33-6 win against Hawthorne High School in the finals to finish the season undefeated.

== Administration ==
The school's principal is Darnel Mangan. His administration team includes five assistant principals.

== Notable alumni ==
- Harold A. Ackerman (1928–2009), United States district judge of the United States District Court for the District of New Jersey
- Asnage Castelly (born 1979, class of 1998), wrestler competing for Haiti at the 2016 Summer Olympics
- Josh Evans (born 1991, class of 2009), safety for the Jacksonville Jaguars
- Maruta Gardner (1947-2016, class of 1965), educator and community activist
- William C. Hill (1917–1998), associate justice of the Vermont Supreme Court
- Carl Howard (born 1961), former NFL player
- Shakur Juiston (born 1996), professional basketball player for Aris of the Greek Basket League
- Martin E. Kravarik (1936–2018), politician who served in the New Jersey General Assembly from District 7B from 1970 to 1972
- Al Sherrod Lambert (born 1985), Grammy Award-winning producer, singer, songwriter, and musician
- Jerry Lewis (1926–2017), actor and comedian
- Kenny and Keith Lucas (born 1985), Academy Award-nominated writers and producers of Judas and the Black Messiah
- John J. Miller Jr. (1923–2012), politician who served in the New Jersey General Assembly from 1962 to 1964
- Raheem Morris (born 1976, class of 1994), head coach of the Atlanta Falcons
- Mario Porter (born 1980, class of 1998), former professional basketball player
- Queen Latifah (born 1970), singer and actress
- Nate Robinson (born 1985, class of 2003), former football defensive tackle
- Adon Shuler (born 2004, class of 2023), American football safety for the Notre Dame Fighting Irish
- Alshermond Singleton (born 1975), former football linebacker who played ten seasons in the NFL for the Tampa Bay Buccaneers and Dallas Cowboys
- Gary Saul Stein (born 1933, class of 1950), attorney and former Associate Justice of the New Jersey Supreme Court, who served for 17 years where he wrote over 365 published opinions
- Red Weiner (1911–1988, class of 1930), multi-sport professional athlete and coach, who played in the NFL for the Philadelphia Eagles
