= Shakur Juiston =

American basketball player (born 1996)

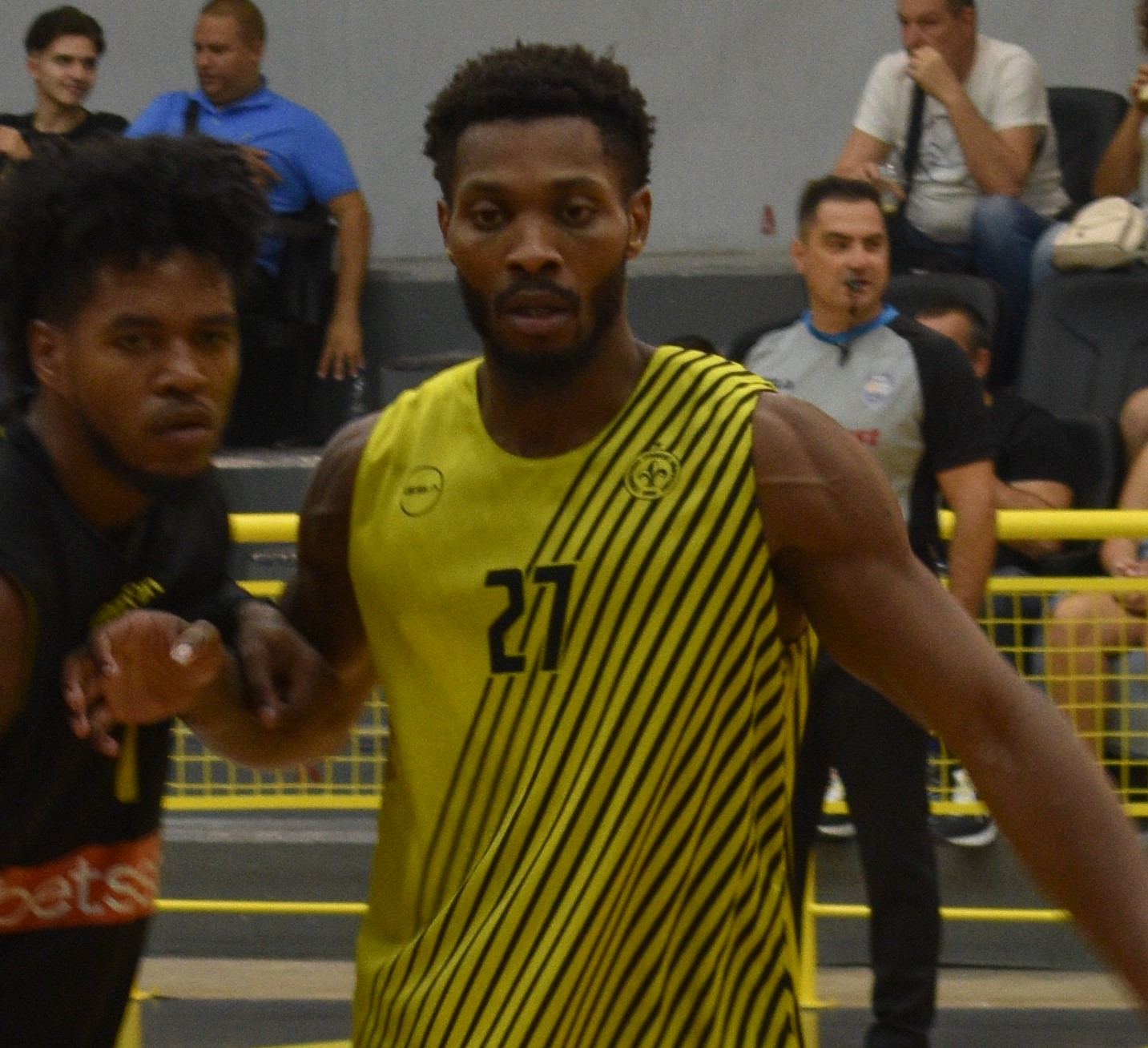
- Juiston in 2023

Free Agent
- Position: Power forward / center

Personal information
- Born: March 31, 1996 (age 30) Newark, New Jersey, U.S.
- Listed height: 2.01 m (6 ft 7 in)
- Listed weight: 102 kg (225 lb)

Career information
- High school: Irvington (Irvington, New Jersey); Eastside (Paterson, New Jersey)
- College: Hutchinson CC (2015–2017); UNLV (2017–2019); Oregon (2019–2020)
- NBA draft: 2020: undrafted
- Playing career: 2021–present

Career history
- 2021: Memphis Hustle
- 2021–2022: Aris Thessaloniki
- 2022–2023: Peristeri
- 2023: Oldenburg
- 2023–2024: Maroussi
- 2024–2025: Hapoel Galil Elyon
- 2025: Aris Thessaloniki

Career highlights
- Greek League All-Star (2022); NABC Junior College Player of the Year (2017); First-team NJCAA All-American (2017); Second-team All-Mountain West (2018)

Shakur Asiatic Juiston (born March 31, 1996) is an American professional basketball player. He played college basketball for Hutchinson, UNLV, and Oregon.

== High school career ==
Juiston began his high school career at Irvington High School, where he averaged 10 points per game during his freshman season. As a sophomore, he averaged 13.3 points per game. For his junior season, Juiston transferred to Eastside High School and averaged 11.5 points per game. As a senior, he averaged 12.5 points per game and helped lead the Ghosts to a 25–7 season and a sectional title. Juiston signed with Hutchinson Community College out of high school.

== College career ==
Juiston averaged 10.9 points and 7.5 rebounds per game for Hutchinson as a freshman. As a sophomore, he averaged 17.3 points, 12.1 rebounds, 3.9 assists, 1.5 steals, and 1.8 blocks per game, leading the Blue Dragons to the NJCAA Division I championship. Juiston was named the NABC NJCAA Player of the Year. He transferred to UNLV. As a junior, Juiston averaged 14.6 points and 10.0 rebounds per game, shooting 63.9 percent from the floor. He was named to the Second Team All-Mountain West Conference. In the first eight games of his senior season, he averaged 10.8 points and 8.8 rebounds per game. Juiston suffered a torn meniscus against Illinois on December 8, 2018, forcing him to have season-ending surgery. After the season he transferred to Oregon as a graduate transfer. He missed five games in December 2019 with a leg injury. Juiston averaged 7.9 points and 6.3 rebounds per game as a redshirt senior.

== Professional career ==
=== Memphis Hustle (2021) ===
On February 19, 2021, Juiston was acquired by the Memphis Hustle of the NBA G League.

=== Aris Thessaloniki (2021–2022) ===
On September 1, 2021, Juiston signed with Aris Thessaloniki of the Greek Basket League. In 25 league games, he averaged 9.8 points, 7.6 rebounds, 1 assist, 0.6 blocks and 1.4 steals in 24 minutes per contest.

=== Peristeri (2022–2023) ===
On June 26, 2022, Juiston signed with Peristeri of the Greek Basket League and the FIBA Champions League.

=== Oldenburg (2023) ===
On February 11, 2023, he signed with Oldenburg of the German Bundesliga.

=== Maroussi (2023–2024) ===
On August 9, 2023, Juiston returned to Greece, after he signed with Maroussi Athens.

=== Hapoel Galil Elyon (2024–2025) ===
On July 13, 2024, Juiston signed with Hapoel Galil Elyon of the Israeli Basketball Premier League.

=== Return to Aris (2025) ===
On February 22, 2025, Juiston returned to Aris for the rest of the season, replacing Nate Laszewski.

=== APU Udine (2025) ===
On June 17, 2025, Juiston signed with APU Udine.
