= Irvington Public Schools =

School district in Essex County, New Jersey, US

Address
- 1 University Place Irvington, Essex County, New Jersey, 07111; United States
- Coordinates: 40.735578°N 74.221149°W

District information
- Grades: PreK-12
- Superintendent: April Vauss
- Business administrator: Reginald Lamptey
- Schools: 12
- Affiliation(s): Former Abbott district

Students and staff
- Enrollment: 8,020 (as of 2019–20)
- Faculty: 530.0 FTEs
- Student–teacher ratio: 15.1:1

Other information
- District Factor Group: A
- Website: www.irvington.k12.nj.us
Ind.	Per pupil	District spending	Rank (*)	K-12 average	%± vs. average
1A	Total Spending	$22,440	91	$18,891	18.8%
1	Budgetary Cost	16,903	88	14,783	14.3%
2	Classroom Instruction	9,453	79	8,763	7.9%
6	Support Services	3,194	94	2,392	33.5%
8	Administrative Cost	1,526	67	1,485	2.8%
10	Operations & Maintenance	2,491	93	1,783	39.7%
13	Extracurricular Activities	124	7	268	−53.7%
16	Median Teacher Salary	56,998	12	64,043
Data from NJDoE 2014 Taxpayers' Guide to Education Spending. *Of K-12 districts with more than 3,500 students. Lowest spending=1; Highest=103

Irvington Public Schools is a public school district serving children in pre-kindergarten through twelfth grade in Irvington, in the U.S. state of New Jersey. The district is one of 31 former Abbott districts statewide that were established pursuant to the decision by the New Jersey Supreme Court in Abbott v. Burke which are now referred to as "SDA Districts" based on the requirement for the state to cover all costs for school building and renovation projects in these districts under the supervision of the New Jersey Schools Development Authority.

As of the 2019–20 school year, the district, comprising 12 schools, had an enrollment of 8,020 students and 530.0 classroom teachers (on an FTE basis), for a student–teacher ratio of 15.1:1.

The district is classified by the New Jersey Department of Education as being in District Factor Group "A", the lowest of eight groupings. District Factor Groups organize districts statewide to allow comparison by common socioeconomic characteristics of the local districts. From lowest socioeconomic status to highest, the categories are A, B, CD, DE, FG, GH, I and J.

== Schools ==
Schools in the district (with 2019–20 enrollment data from the National Center for Education Statistics) are:

Preschool

- Augusta Preschool Academy (with 341 students; in PreK)
  - Hubert Ato-Bakari Chase

Elementary schools

- Berkeley Terrace School (387; PreK–5)
  - Rose Gorgdon, principal
- Chancellor Avenue School (527; K–5)
  - Andrea Tucker, principal
- Florence Avenue School (672; K–5)
  - Frantz Meronvil, principal
- Grove Street School (428; PreK–5)
  - Deniese Cooper, principal
- Madison Avenue School (410; PreK–5)
  - Malikita Wright, principal
- Thurgood G. Marshall School (398; PreK–5)
  - Stacey Love, principal
- Mount Vernon Avenue School (542; K–5)
  - ,Edna Correia principal
- University Elementary School (403; K–5)
  - Chinaire Simons, principal

Middle schools

- Union Avenue Middle School (778; 6–8)
  - Kcyied Zahir, principal
- University Middle School (403; 6–8)
  - Michael Bussacco, principal

High school

- Irvington High School (1,558; 9–12)
  - Darnell Mangan, principal
- Rita L. Owens STEAM Academy (9-12)
  - Tyisha Bennett, principal

== Administration ==
Core members of the district's administration are:

- April Vauss, superintendent
- Reginald Lamptey, business administrator and board secretary

== Board of education ==
The district's board of education, comprised of nine members, sets policy and oversees the fiscal and educational operation of the district through its administration. As a Type II school district, the board's trustees are elected directly by voters to serve three-year terms of office on a staggered basis, with three seats up for election each year held as part of the April school election. The board appoints a superintendent to oversee the district's day-to-day operations and a business administrator to supervise the business functions of the district. Of the nearly 600 school districts statewide, Irvington is one of 12 districts with school elections in April, in which voters also decide on passage of the annual school budget.
