= Joe Rosentover =

- Born: Joseph Rosentover; January 12, 1903; US
- Died: December 4, 1973 (aged 70); Clifton, Passaic County, New Jersey
- Occupation: Football Manager
- Known for: Manager, President: American Association minor football league; Atlantic Coast Football League

Joseph Rosentover (12 January 1903 - 4 December 1973) became the manager and president of the American Association football league in 1936 and also became the president of Atlantic Coast Football League in 1963.

== Personal life ==
Rosentover was born in 1903. He died at the age of 70 in 1973.

== American Association ==
In 1936, when he was 33, Rosentover was made president of the newly founded American Association. In 1940 the league started to include teams from Ohio and Pennsylvania. He was inducted into the American Football Association Hall of Fame in 1983.

== Atlantic Coast Football League ==
In 1963, the year after the league was started, Rosentover was made president and manager of the Atlantic Coast Football League, a league that included teams from several former AA/AFL markets (including two, the Newark Bears and Providence Steam Roller that revived former AA teams). Rosentover was with the league through no later than the 1967 season; by 1968, Cosmo Iacavazzi had replaced him as head of the league.
