= Union City Rams =

Defunct American football team

General information
- Founded: 1937
- Folded: 1940
- Stadium: Dexter Park; Roosevelt Stadium
- Headquartered: Brooklyn, New York, Union City, New Jersey

Personnel
- Head coach: Paul Riblett (1937); Bob Rosen (1938); Tony Sarausky (1939)

Team history
- Brooklyn Bushwicks (1937), Union City Rams (1938–1939)

League / conference affiliations
- American Association (1937–1939): Northern (1937); None (1938); Southern (1939)

The Union City Rams, originally known as the Brooklyn Buswicks were a minor league American football team that played from 1937 to 1939. They never had more than 2 wins in a season.

== Brooklyn Bushwicks ==
They were originally named the Brooklyn Bushwicks in 1937. They played in the Northern Division and had a 1-4-1 record. Their head coach was Paul Riblett.

== Union City Rams ==
=== 1938 Season ===
In 1938 they moved and changed their name to the Union City Rams. The Rams had a 2-5-1 record. Their head coach was Bob Rosen.

=== 1939 Season ===
Their third and final season was in 1939. They were moved to the Southern Division and had a 2-5-2 record. They folded after the season.
