= Ed Kahn =

American football player (1911–1945)

No. 43
- Position: Guard

Personal information
- Born: November 9, 1911; New York City, U.S.
- Died: February 17, 1945 (aged 33); Leyte, Philippines †

Career information
- College: North Carolina

Career history
- 1935–1936: Boston Redskins
- 1937: Washington Redskins

Awards and highlights
- NFL champion (1937)
- Stats at Pro Football Reference

Other information
- Military career
- Allegiance: United States
- Branch: United States Army
- Rank: First Lieutenant
- Conflicts: World War II: Battle of Kwajalein; Battle of Leyte

Edwin Bernard Kahn (November 9, 1911 – February 17, 1945) was an American football guard in the National Football League (NFL) for the Boston and Washington Redskins. He played college football at the University of North Carolina.

== Early life and college career ==
Edwin Bernard Kahn was born in New York City on November 9, 1911. He grew up in Roxbury, Massachusetts, attended Boston English High School, and played on the football team in his sophomore year with limited success.

He went to the North Carolina to study law, but after he put on enough weight, he tried football again, making the freshman football team as a fullback. He lettered for three years as a guard on the varsity team, and acquired the nickname "King Kong". The 1934 Tar Heels, coached by Carl Snavely, went 7–1–1, with the "ladies from hell" Kahn and George Barclay as guards, and Jim Tatum (later the coach of the 1953 University of Maryland national champion team) at tackle. Kahn was All-Southern Conference in 1933, and All-Southern Conference, All South Atlantic, Players All-America, and Jewish All America in 1934.

== Professional career ==
After graduating in 1935, Kahn tried out for the Boston Redskins, making the team as a guard and becoming the third North Carolina player to join the NFL. The owner George Preston Marshall gave Kahn permission to sit out the first game in 1935 because it fell on Rosh Hashanah. Kahn played for Boston in the 1935 and 1936 seasons. He won a starting position in the sixth game of the 1936 season against the Philadelphia Eagles, helping the Ray Flaherty-coached Redskins to their first winning season (7–5) and the Eastern Division title. The Redskins lost to the Packers in the championship game and Kahn was selected to the 1936 All-NFL 2nd team.

After the 1936 season, Kahn was traded to the Bears, but was bought back by the Redskins before the 1937 season. That year, he scored a touchdown on a fumble return against the Eagles as the Redskins went 8–3 and beat the Bears for the championship.

In August 1938, the Redskins played and lost to a college all-star team at the Cotton Bowl in Dallas. The program listed "Kahn, Edwin [...] Nationality, Hebrew." Later that month, they lost to another college all-star team at the Chicago College All-Star Game at Soldier Field. October 1938 featured a full-page picture of Kahn, taken by Carl Mydans, in Life magazine.

The Redskins purchased a Hazleton, Pennsylvania-based minor league football team in 1938, and appointed Kahn as player-coach. He led the Hazelton Redskins to the Eastern Pennsylvania League and Dixie Championships before retiring from football at the end of the season.

Kahn was remembered by Corinne Griffith, film star and wife of Marshall, in her book My Life with the Redskins: "... Eddie Kahn, one of the original eleven Redskins who made the famous goal-line stand against the Giants there on the 1-yard line in Griffith Stadium in the opening game of the 1937 season. That night when the Washington Redskins were born."

== Death ==
Kahn volunteered for the United States Army when the country entered World War II, joining the infantry. His sister, Edna May (Kahn) Schneider, was in the Women's Army Corps.

A first lieutenant, he was wounded in the Battle of Kwajalein and received a Purple Heart and Presidential Unit Citation. In the invasion of Leyte in the Philippines in October 1944, Kahn suffered serious injuries during the beach landing from which he died in February 1945.

He was inducted into the Greater Washington Jewish Sports Hall of Fame in 2013. His sister Edna died in 2014.
