= American Association (American football) =

Defunct football minor league

- Sport: American football
- Founded: 1936
- First season: 1936
- Folded: 1950
- Claim to fame: First official NFL minor-league
- No. of teams: 6 (1940, 1948–1950) to 9 (1937)
- Country: United States
- Last champion: Richmond Rebels
- Related competitions: Northeast Football League, Atlantic Coast Football League

The American Association (AA) was a professional American football minor league based in New York City. Founded in 1936 with teams in New York and New Jersey, the AA extended its reach to Providence, Rhode Island prior to the onset of World War II. After a four-year hiatus, the league was renamed the American Football League as it expanded to include teams in Ohio and Pennsylvania. In 1947, the Richmond Rebels of the Dixie League purchased the assets of the defunct AFL Long Island Indians and jumped leagues (causing the demise of the DL).

The American Association was the first minor football league with a working arrangement with the National Football League as a system of farm clubs, beginning with the purchase of the Stapleton Buffaloes (which played one game as the New York Tigers) by New York Giants owner Tim Mara in 1937.

In the late 1930s and 1940s, the league enjoyed popularity comparable to that of the more established National Football League (NFL) of 1920/1922, despite being in direct competition. In 1949 and 1950, the league was adversely affected by instability of membership. After starting its last season with six teams, only two league members survived to the end of the year.

The Atlantic Coast Football League originally established itself in several former American Association markets (reviving some of the team names as well) and hiring the same president, Joe Rosentover, when it began play in 1962.

== Origin of league ==
The American Association was formed after a proposal by Edwin Simandl, manager of the Orange Tornadoes football team. Members of the defunct Eastern League (1932) and Interstate League (1933) became charter members of the new AA and Joe Rosentover, the owner of the Passaic Red Devils, became the league's president. The original lineup consisted of four teams from New York (Mt. Vernon Cardinals, Brooklyn Bay Parkways, New Rochelle Bulldogs, and White Plains Bears) and four from New Jersey (Orange Tornadoes, Paterson Panthers, Passaic Red Devils, and Stapleton Buffaloes, the last of which consisted mostly of the remains of the defunct Staten Island Stapletons). The formation of the league was announced in June 1936.

From 1936 to 1937, there was at least one "groupie" team that never joined the league, but played the bulk of its games against AA franchises: the Harlem Brown Bombers, a barnstorming/traveling team that consisted entirely of black players and was coached by Fritz Pollard, played seven games against AA teams over two years, compiling a 1-4-1 record.

== American Association (1936–1941) ==
=== 1936 ===
While the league did not have official divisions, several sources show the membership divided into a “New York Division” (NY) and a “New Jersey Division” (NJ). Teams are ranked by win percentage.

Team	W	L	T	Pct.	PF	PA
Paterson Panthers (NJ)	4	1	0	.800	59	13
Brooklyn Bay Parkways (NY)	4	2	2	.667	86	32
New Rochelle Bulldogs (NY)	3	2	1	.600	30	40
Mt. Vernon Cardinals (NY)	3	2	0	.600	37	42
Orange Tornadoes (NJ)	4	4	0	.500	54	55
Passaic Red Devils (NJ)	3	5	0	.375	33	76
White Plains Bears (NY)	2	4	0	.333	27	40
Stapleton Buffaloes (NJ)	1	4	1	.200	26	54

Playoffs: Brooklyn 18, New Rochelle 0; Paterson 10, Orange 0 (Mt. Vernon declined to participate in playoffs)

Championship: Brooklyn wins title after Paterson withdraws (Paterson stays in the league)

In the first game of a series between the AA champion and the winners of the Dixie League, the Washington Pros (Dixie League) defeated the Brooklyn Bay Parkways (American Association) 13-6 in Richmond, Virginia, January 1, 1937. It was the last time that an American Association team lost to a team in the Dixie League in a football game.

=== 1937 ===
Passaic dropped out due to stadium issues and was replaced by the Brooklyn Bushwicks and the Danbury Trojans; the Brooklyn Bay Parkways were renamed the Brooklyn Eagles (remiscent of the iconic daily newspaper in the borough, the "Brooklyn Eagle"); the Orange Tornadoes moved to Newark, New Jersey; and the Stapleton Buffaloes officially "moved" to Manhattan to become the New York Tigers, a traveling team that lasted only one game. Although Passaic dropped out, owner Rosentover continued serving as A.A. president, a position he would hold for another 13 years, until the dissolution of the league.

While the league was "unofficially divided" into two divisions in its first year, the realigned American Association was put into two official divisions for 1937: a Northern and a Southern division. For the 1937 season only, standings were based on two points per win and one point per tie.

Point totals do not include 1-0 forfeit scores.

The 1937 championship game matched the Newark Tornadoes against the White Plains Bears, which ended in a 3-3 tie. Newark suggested an extra period to end the game, with the blessing of the league commissioner provided that White Plains agreed, but the Bears refused and the title was shared.

==== Northern Division ====
Team	W	L	T	Pct.	PF	PA	Pts.
White Plains Bears	3	2	1	.600	19	49	7
Danbury Trojans	3	1	0	.750	58	0	6
New Rochelle Bulldogs	3	6	0	.333	62	65	6
Brooklyn Bushwicks	1	4	1	.200	17	74	3
Mt. Vernon Cardinals	1	6	1	.143	14	88	3

==== Southern Division ====
Team	W	L	T	Pct.	PF	PA	Pts.
Newark Tornadoes	6	1	3	.857	96	31	15
Paterson Panthers	4	1	1	.800	95	7	9
Brooklyn Eagles	4	3	1	.571	35	62	9
New York Tigers	0	1	0	.000	0	20	0

Championship: Newark 3, Paterson 3 (co-champions declared when Paterson refused to play the suggested overtime period)

=== 1938 ===
Gone were Mt. Vernon, New Rochelle, and White Plains; the Clifton Wessingtons received the rights to White Plains' 1937 team and joined the AA for 1938; and the Brooklyn Bushwicks moved to Union City, New Jersey, and became the Rams. Tim Mara, New York Giants owner, purchased the Stapleton franchise, moved it to Jersey City, New Jersey, and made it the first farm team in professional football. Bill Owen, brother of Steve Owen, managed the team. A number of former New York Giant players were on the New Jersey team, including Ken Strong, who was barred from the NFL club until 1939 after defecting to the New York Yankees of the second American Football League in 1936.

In the lineup of the Brooklyn Eagles was a reserve guard who eventually made his mark as a head coach: Vince Lombardi. The Clifton Wessingtons featured tailback Joe Lillard, the last African American NFL player before the imposition of a color line in 1936.

Down to seven teams, the league decided to scrap the divisional alignment for 1938. In addition, there were no plans for championship playoffs: the championship was determined strictly by winning percentage (ignoring tie games).

Team	W	L	T	Pct.	PF	PA
Jersey City Giants	7	1	0	.875	133	7
Danbury Trojans	4	1	1	.800	67	26
Paterson Panthers	6	3	0	.667	114	60
Brooklyn Eagles	3	5	1	.375	81	70
Union City Rams	2	5	1	.286	52	121
Newark Tornadoes	2	5	0	.286	28	119
Clifton Wessingtons	1	5	1	.167	27	199

No playoffs: Jersey City was declared league champions

=== 1939 ===
A year after Tim Mara bought the Jersey City Giants and used it as a farm team for his New York Giants NFL franchise, the AA underwent more change in 1939. Gone was Clifton, but the league returned to a two-division, eight team format as the Wilmington Clippers and the Providence Steamroller (independent teams in 1937 and 1938) joined the AA. Chicago Bears owner George Halas purchased the Newark Tornadoes and renamed them the Bears (Wilmington protested the Bears' use of Sid Luckman in a playoff game, which the Bears won, 13-6, to win the Southern Division title).

==== Northern Division ====
Team	W	L	T	Pct.	PF	PA
Paterson Panthers	7	5	0	.583	145	115
Providence Steamroller	3	4	0	.429	53	89
Danbury Trojans	0	5	1	.000	26	114
Brooklyn Eagles	0	7	1	.000	26	140

==== Southern Division ====
Team	W	L	T	Pct.	PF	PA
Newark Bears	6	2	1	.750	122	71
Wilmington Clippers	9	3	1	.750	158	66
Jersey City Giants	7	3	1	.700	148	52
Union City Rams	2	5	2	.286	82	113

Championship: Newark 27, Paterson 7

=== 1940 ===
Brooklyn, Danbury, and Union City dropped out in the offseason; the Long Island Indians join the league for the 1940 season... and was promptly raided by members of the new American Football League and lost four starters. The rest of the American Association was similarly hurt by defections to the new league (the Boston Shamrocks, champions of the AFL in both 1940 and 1941, got the bulk of its roster by raiding the Indians and the Steamroller).

Back to only six teams, the AA instituted a Shaughnessy playoff system, with the fourth-place team facing the first-place team and the second- and third-place teams meeting in semifinal matches, with the winners facing each other in a championship game.

Team	W	L	T	Pct.	PF	PA
Jersey City Giants	6	3	1	.667	104	46
Paterson Panthers	6	4	0	.600	106	133
Wilmington Clippers	5	4	1	.556	139	64
Newark Bears	5	5	1	.500	136	121
Long Island Indians	5	5	1	.500	88	123
Providence Steamroller	2	8	0	.200	41	127

Standings include two forfeits by Providence; the point totals do not. Providence dropped out of the league November 12, 1940, but was expected to return for the 1941 season.

Playoffs: Newark and Long Island tied for the last playoff spot. The two teams played to a 0-0 tie on December 1, 1940. A rematch scheduled for December 5 was cancelled due to snow; the league broke the tie with a best three-of-five coin toss, which Newark won to enter the playoffs.

Semifinal games: Jersey City 7, Newark 6; Wilmington 11, Paterson 8

Championship: Jersey City 17, Wilmington 7

=== 1941 ===
While Tim Mara sold the Jersey City Giants, the team was sold to the owners of the N.F.L.'s Cleveland Rams, setting off a sequence of arrangements that tied the membership of the AA (except Providence) with the NFL. The raiding of the AA by the AFL continued, with Wilmington and Providence being particularly hard hit. The Steamroller's loss of seven players forced the team to drop out of the league. The A.A. found a replacement team with a connection with the AFL: the New York Yankees.

The 1941 New York Yankees was not the same team as the 1940 Yankees. The latter was team of the AFL that was sold to Douglas Hertz in late 1940, but the AFL revoked the franchise in August 1941 in response to a financial controversy on the part of Hertz. The team was then sold to a group headed by William Cox (who later became the president of the AFL) as preparations for the new season had begun (under the new regime, the name of the team was changed to the New York Americans). Hertz then formed a new barnstorming team, called it the New York Yankees, and started playing independent teams in the American northeast before accepting the invitation to join the American Association. The team left the League after losing all six of its games and folded after the Japanese attack on Pearl Harbor ushered in the United States' participation in World War II, December 7th, 1941, and making a question in the future temporarily for all professional sports.

Team	W	L	T	Pct.	PF	PA
Long Island Indians	8	2	0	.800	176	45
Paterson Panthers	6	2	2	.750	142	72
Wilmington Clippers	4	3	2	.571	120	77
Jersey City Giants	4	4	2	.500	47	99
Newark Bears	3	6	0	.333	62	105
Providence Steamroller	0	2	0	.000	7	24
New York Yankees	0	6	0	.000	13	143

Playoffs: Wilmington 33, Paterson 0; Long Island 7, Jersey City 6

Championship: Wilmington 21, Long Island 13

=== 1942 ===
The Hartford Blues were expected to replace the New York Yankees for the 1942 season; the Churchill Pros (based in Springfield, Massachusetts) were enlisted to replace Providence when the team became the new Springfield Steamroller.

American Association president John Rosentover announced in August 1942, that the AA was following the lead of the third American Football League, in that the league was suspending operations due to World War II.

Despite the absence of the AA, there was an unofficial "league" operating in the area - the Northeast Football League, with an informal association of teams that operated since 1940. To the already existing Blues, Steamroller, Wilmington Clippers and Paterson Panthers joined the newly formed Holyoke Golden Bears, Long Island Clippers, New London Diesels and Worcester Panthers. Wilmington considered the best team in the circuit, finishing undefeated with only one tie against Philadelphia Eagles.

While some member teams kept playing on in an informal assemblage, the Northeast circuit did not return in 1943, and the AA remained officially out of action until the post-war year of 1946.

== American Football League (1946–1950) ==
In the autumn of 1945, after the surrender of Japan in World War II, the American Association returned to business, unlike the third American Football League. John Rosentover remained league president, and the five teams that finished the 1941 AA season (Jersey City, Long Island, Newark, Paterson, and Wilmington) returned to the fold, but the two franchises that were supposed to join the league in 1942 (Hartford and Springfield) did not survive the league's layover.

The third American Football League, which had originally announced intentions of resuming play after the war, did not survive it either, so the American Association adopted a new name upon resumption of operations: "American Football League". The league renewed its working relationship with the old National Football League, of 1920/1922, considered a "major league" of pro football. A compact with the Dixie League and the far west's Pacific Coast Professional Football League prohibited the participation of players signed to "outlaw leagues" (originally directed toward the third AFL, but, starting 1946, also applied to the newly formed All-America Football Conference of 1946–1949, soon to be involved in major league competition with the old NFL). On March 24, 1946, the formalization of the compact, the Association of Professional Football Leagues as the "Big Three" of the minor leagues of pro football in the United States, was announced by PCPFL president (and Association chairman) J. Rufus Klawans.

=== 1946 ===
The resurrected league had three new entries for the first post-war season: the Scranton Miners, Newark Bombers (replacing the Bears, who moved to Akron, Ohio), and the Bethlehem Bulldogs. As the games resumed, fan attendance returned to prewar levels.

==== Eastern Division ====
Team	W	L	T	Pct.	PF	PA
Jersey City Giants	9	1	0	.900	204	86
Long Island Indians	5	5	0	.500	104	124
Newark Bombers	2	7	1	.222	99	166
Paterson Panthers	2	8	0	.000	102	195

==== Western Division ====
Team	W	L	T	Pct.	PF	PA
Akron Bears	8	2	0	.800	263	122
Scranton Miners	5	3	2	.625	160	143
Bethlehem Bulldogs	5	4	1	.556	203	172
Wilmington Clippers	1	7	2	.125	57	184

Championship: Jersey City 14, Akron 13

=== 1947 ===
Akron left the AFL in early 1947, leaving Newark as the Chicago Bears' primary farm team. Newark moved to Bloomfield, New Jersey, and became the Cardinals. Similarly, the Scranton Minors moved to Wilkes-Barre and became the Barons. The league retained its divisional setup despite having only seven teams.

==== Eastern Division ====
Team	W	L	T	Pct.	PF	PA
Paterson Panthers	8	2	0	.800	152	111
Bloomfield Cardinals	6	4	0	.600	184	134
Jersey City Giants	5	5	0	.500	139	128
Richmond Rebels	3	3	1	.500	112	105
Long Island Indians	0	3	0	.000	19	72

==== Western Division ====
Team	W	L	T	Pct.	PF	PA
Bethlehem Bulldogs	8	1	0	.900	264	73
Wilmington Clippers	2	5	1	.286	74	147
Wilkes-Barre Barons	0	9	0	.000	77	251

The Long Island Indians dropped out after three games; their franchise was acquired in October 1947 by the Richmond Rebels, which started the season competing in the Dixie League. The defection reduced the Dixie League to just three members, and another long-standing minor league (founded 1936) folded within a week.

Championship: Bethlehem 23, Paterson 7

=== 1948 ===
Bloomfield folded before the start of play in 1948 and the league scrapped its two-division setup for the upcoming season. The Shaughnessy playoff system was reinstated.

Bethlehem was crippled by a pair of events prior to play. First, the Philadelphia Eagles ended their working arrangement with the Bulldogs and worked with Paterson instead; second, the league instituted a new rule limiting salaries to $2000 a game per team (in 1947, the Bulldogs averaged $5500 a week). After a 0-4 start blamed in part by salary dissention, owner Bob Sell released seven players. The team barely missed the playoffs despite playing the last six games with a 4-1-1 record.

It was the last year that the league had an official working agreement with NFL teams, as the league severed ties with all minor league teams. The last affiliate teams were Paterson Panthers (Eagles), Jersey City Giants and Richmond Rebels (Bears), although some teams kept an informal relationship with their NFL affiliates until the AFL collapsed.

Team	W	L	T	Pct.	PF	PA
Paterson Panthers	7	1	2	.875	224	103
Richmond Rebels	6	4	0	.600	164	142
Wilmington Clippers	5	4	1	.556	148	137
Jersey City Giants	5	5	0	.500	154	168
Bethlehem Bulldogs	4	5	1	.444	158	155
Wilkes-Barre Bullets	1	9	0	.100	57	200

Playoffs: Wilmington defeated Richmond; Paterson beat Jersey City

Championship: Paterson 24, Wilmington 14

=== 1949 ===
With the dissolution of the Pacific Coast Professional Football League in 1948, the American Football League (formed as the American Association in 1936) became the sole remaining prewar minor league. Charter member Paterson had not missed a week of league play (except refusing to play the 1936 league championship game), and would not until the end of the league. For the first time since the end of World War II, there were no changes in membership prior to league play in 1949.

Team	W	L	T	Pct.	PF	PA
Richmond Rebels	8	1	1	.889	285	99
Paterson Panthers	6	3	1	.667	192	141
Bethlehem Bulldogs	6	4	0	.600	154	138
Wilmington Clippers	5	5	0	.500	93	155
Wilkes-Barre Bullets	3	7	0	.300	81	112
Jersey City Giants	1	9	0	.100	68	228

Playoffs: Richmond 66, Wilmington 0; Paterson 16, Bethlehem 7

Championship: Richmond 35, Paterson 14

After winning three games in their first four games, Wilkes-Barre was hit by a rash of injuries in their games with Richmond and Paterson. Bob Edgerson, Bullets president, informed the league that the injuries would force him to cancel an upcoming game with Wilmington. Two days later, league president Joe Rosentover revoked the franchise. Rosentover then asked the independent Erie Vets if they could finish the Bullets' schedule, but the team had disbanded for the season. The last four scheduled Wilkes-Barre games were declared forfeits.

Richmond owner Harry Seibold applied for an expansion franchise in the All-America Football Conference, which had lost a member when the New York Yankees and the Brooklyn Dodgers merged for the 1949 season. No action was taken on the application as the AAFC merged with the NFL for the 1950 season. Richmond remained in the AFL.

=== 1950 ===
Although the Erie Vets could not complete Wilkes-Barre's schedule in 1949, they did join the AFL for the 1950 season; in addition, the Wilmington Clippers left the league and were replaced by the Brooklyn Brooks. The league made an unsuccessful overture to the Buffalo Bisons (AAFC), who had been rejected when the AAFC and the NFL merged, to have the Bisons join the AFL. The league abandoned the Shaughnessy playoff system and opted to have only the top two finishers play for the championship. It turned out that only two teams were still playing at the end of the season.

Bethlehem called it quits in early October, having lost two games (one by forfeit); later that week, the Brooklyn franchise was revoked for failure to pay the entrance fee. After Joe Rosentover announced the revocation, he announced that the games involving the Bulldogs or the Brooks would not count (they are included below). A new league schedule was drawn up, but in early November, charter member Paterson was forced to close up shop because of a financial dispute.

Later that month, longtime league member Jersey City Giants (who entered the league in 1938 after its owners purchased the assets of charter member Stapleton Buffaloes) also called it quits after being crushed by each of the other two remaining teams in the league. Thus after nine weeks, Erie and Richmond were the last teams standing.

Team	W	L	T	Pct.	PF	PA
Richmond Rebels	6	3	0	.667	239	145
Erie Vets	5	3	0	.625	154	142
Paterson Panthers	4	4	0	.500	94	76
Jersey City Giants	3	4	0	.429	83	137
Brooklyn Brooks	0	2	0	.000	21	63
Bethlehem Bulldogs	0	2	0	.000	7	35

Includes forfeits by Brooklyn and Bethlehem (point totals exclude them); official league records have the games involving Brooklyn and Bethlehem stricken.

Championship: Richmond 35, Erie 7

With only two teams remaining in the league, this American Football League (the fourth of that name) folded after the championship game.

== See also ==
- Pacific Coast Professional Football League
- American Football League (1934)
- American Football League (1936)
- American Football League (1938)
- American Football League (1940)
- Atlantic Coast Football League
