= United States at the 2025 World Games =

- IOC code: USA
- NOC: United States Olympic Committee

in Chengdu, China 7 August 2025 – 17 August 2025
- Competitors: 180 (76 men and 104 women) in 24 sports
- Medals Ranked 6th: Gold 11 Silver 10 Bronze 7 Total 28

World Games appearances (overview)
- 1981; 1985; 1989; 1993; 1997; 2001; 2005; 2009; 2013; 2017; 2022; 2025

The United States competed at the 2025 World Games held in Chengdu, China from 7 to 17 August 2025. Athletes representing the United States won 11 gold medals, 10 silver medals and 7 bronze medals. The country finished in 6th place in the medal table.

== Competitors ==
The following is the list of number of competitors in the Games.

Sport	Men	Women	Total
Air sports	1	1	2
Archery	5	3	8
Billiards	2	2	4
Cheerleading	0	2	2
Dancesport	2	2	4
Fistball	0	9	9
Flag football	0	12	12
Flying disc	8	8	16
Gymnastics	5	10	15
Karate	2	1	3
Kickboxing	1	0	1
Korfball	3	3	6
Lacrosse	0	12	12
Muaythai	1	1	2
Powerboating	2	1	3
Powerlifting	6	6	12
Racquetball	1	1	2
Roller sports	13	1	14
Sambo	1	0	1
Softball	15	15	30
Sport climbing	4	4	8
Tug of war	0	8	8
Wakeboarding	3	2	5
Wushu	1	0	1
Total	76	104	180

== Medalists ==
Medal	Name	Sport	Event	Date
Gold	United States men's national softball team: Tyler Damon; Yusef Davis; Marco Diaz; Braden Ducharme; Brennan Ducharme; Cody Gibbons; Tyler Johnson; Bradley Kilpatrick; Frank Kimlinger; Jeff Lewis; Jonathan Lynch; Blaine Milheim; Nick Mullins; Erick Ochoa; Zachary Shaw	Softball	Men's tournament	10 August
Gold	Jett Lambert	Wakeboarding	Men's skim	10 August
Gold	Gannon Buhr; Missy Gannon	Flying disc	Mixed doubles disc golf	10 August
Gold	Kaden Brown	Trampoline gymnastics	Men's tumbling	10 August
Gold	United States women's national lacrosse team: Chloe Humphrey; Sam Apuzzo; Marie McCool; Cassidy Weeks; Charlotte North; Ally Mastroianni; Kenzie Kent; Izzy Scane; Ally Kennedy; Taylor Moreno; Shea Dolce; Ellie Masera	Lacrosse	Women's tournament	11 August
Gold	United States men's national inline hockey team: Patrick Pugliese; Nicholas DellaMorte; Scott Savage; Corey Hodge; Ryan Marker; Joseph DiMartino; Charles Vaughan; Kyle Mooney; Keith Johnson; Maxwell Halvorsen; Jose Cadiz; William Pascalli; Kevin Mooney	Inline hockey	Men's tournament	11 August
Gold	Marques Brownlee; Claire Chastain; Dawn Culton; Carolyn Finney; Dylan Freechild; Kameryn Groom; Raphael Hayes; Kaela Helton; Christopher Kocher; Henry Ing; Grant Lindsley; Anna Thompson; Claire Trop	Flying disc	Ultimate flying disc	16 August
Gold	Taylor Lachapelle	Powerlifting	Women's equipped middleweight	16 August
Gold	Sydney Martin	Cheerleading	Pom doubles	16 August
Gold	Jacob Bredenbeck; Naomi Ros	Racquetball	Mixed doubles	17 August
Gold	United States women's national softball team: Maya Brady; Ally Carda; Jayda Coleman; Megan Faraimo; Hannah Flippen; Rachel Garcia; Sahvanna Jaquish; Janae Jefferson; Tiare Jennings; Amanda Lorenz; Kelly Maxwell; Dejah Mulipola; Bubba Nickles; Skylar Wallace; Jessie Warren	Softball	Women's tournament	17 August
Silver	Ariel Torres	Karate	Men's kata	8 August
Silver	Curtis Broadnax	Archery	Men's compound	9 August
Silver	Caylei Caldwell; Olivia Green; Rebecca Greenberg	Acrobatic gymnastics	Women's group	9 August
Silver	Aaron Ortiz	Muaythai	Men's 86 kg	10 August
Silver	Grace Harder	Trampoline gymnastics	Women's double mini	10 August
Silver	Sam Watson	Sport climbing	Men's speed single	14 August
Silver	Michael Hom; Logan Schlecht	Sport climbing	Men's speed relay	16 August
Silver	Kelsey Mc Carthy	Powerlifting	Women's equipped heavyweight	17 August
Silver	United States women's national flag football team: Brianna Hernandez-Silva; Ashley Edwards; London Jenkins; Vanita Krouch; Madison Fulford; Maci Joncich; Amber Clark-Robinson; Deliah Autry; Addison Orsborn; Isabella Geraci; Laneah Bryan; Ashlea Klam	Flag football	Women's tournament	17 August
Silver	Jared Martin	Powerlifting	Men's equipped super heavyweight	17 August
Bronze	Curtis Broadnax; Alexis Ruiz	Archery	Mixed team compound	8 August
Bronze	Shea Rudolph	Parkour	Men's freestyle	12 August
Bronze	Anthony Schleicher	Kickboxing	Men's K1 75 kg	14 August
Bronze	Sam Watson; Zachary Hammer	Sport climbing	Men's speed relay	16 August
Bronze	Fawn Girard	Archery	Women's barebow	16 August
Bronze	Ian Bell	Powerlifting	Men's equipped heavyweight	17 August
Bronze	Mary Krebs	Powerlifting	Women's equipped super heavyweight	17 August

Medals by sport
Sport	1st place, gold medalist(s)	2nd place, silver medalist(s)	3rd place, bronze medalist(s)	Total
Flying disc	2	0	0	2
Softball	2	0	0	2
Powerlifting	1	2	2	5
Trampoline gymnastics	1	1	0	2
Cheerleading	1	0	0	1
Inline hockey	1	0	0	1
Lacrosse	1	0	0	1
Racquetball	1	0	0	1
Wakeboarding	1	0	0	1
Sport climbing	0	2	1	3
Archery	0	1	2	3
Acrobatic gymnastics	0	1	0	1
Flag football	0	1	0	1
Karate	0	1	0	1
Muaythai	0	1	0	1
Kickboxing	0	0	1	1
Parkour	0	0	1	1
Total	11	10	7	28

== Flag football ==
Women

Team	Event	Group play				Quarterfinals	Semifinal	Final / BM	
Team	Event	Opposition Result	Opposition Result	Opposition Result	Rank	Opposition Result	Opposition Result	Opposition Result	Rank
USA women	Women's tournament	Canada; W 39–31	Austria; W 48–34	China; W 39–12	1 Q	Italy; W 33–12	Austria; W 46–39	Mexico; L 21–26	2nd place, silver medalist(s)

== Gymnastics ==
=== Parkour ===
Athlete	Event	Qualification		Final	
Athlete	Event	Result	Rank	Result	Rank
Shea Rudolph	Men's freestyle	25.2	3 Q	26.7	3rd place, bronze medalist(s)
Audrey Johnson	Women's speed	33.80	5 Q	40.33	4
Audrey Johnson	Women's freestyle	20.0	5 Q	20.5	4

== Inline hockey ==
Summary

Team	Event	Group stage				Semifinal	Final / BM	
Team	Event	Opposition Score	Opposition Score	Opposition Score	Rank	Opposition Score	Opposition Score	Rank
USA men	Men's tournament	China; W 20–1	Chinese Taipei; W 1–4	Namibia; W 7–0	1 Q	France; W 2–1	Czech Republic; W 4–3	1st place, gold medalist(s)

== Korfball ==
Beach

The United States qualified in beach korfball at the 2024 World Beach Korfball Championship.

Athlete	Event	Group stage				Quarterfinal	Semi-final	Final / BM	
Athlete	Event	Opposition Score	Opposition Score	Opposition Score	Rank	Opposition Score	Opposition Score	Opposition Score	Rank
Team USA	Beach Korfball	Chinese Taipei; L 8–5	Hungary; D 5–5	China; L 18–6	4	Netherlands; L 13–8	Poland; L 8–12	New Zealand; W 7–3	7

== Softball ==
Men

Team	Event	Group play				Semifinal	Final / BM	
Team	Event	Opposition Result	Opposition Result	Opposition Result	Rank	Opposition Result	Opposition Result	Rank
USA Men	Men's tournament	Singapore; W 15–2	Canada; W 6–3	Australia; W 3–14	1 Q	Venezuela; W 0–7	Japan; Cancelled	1st place, gold medalist(s)

Women

Team	Event	Group play				Semifinal	Final / BM	
Team	Event	Opposition Result	Opposition Result	Opposition Result	Rank	Opposition Result	Opposition Result	Rank
USA women	Women's tournament	Chinese Taipei; W 4–0	Netherlands; W 1–8	China; W 1–8	1 Q	Japan; W 6–7	Chinese Taipei; W 5–0	1st place, gold medalist(s)
