= Brianna Hernandez-Silva =

American flag football player (born 1999)

Personal information
- Born: April 13, 1999 (age 27)
- Home town: Las Vegas, Nevada, U.S.
- Height: 5 ft 4 in (163 cm)

Sport
- Country: United States
- Sport: Flag football
- Position: Defensive back, quarterback
Medal record
Women's flag football
Representing United States
World Games
Silver medal – second place	2025 Chengdu	Team
IFAF Americas Continental Championship
Bronze medal – third place	2025 Penonomé	Team

Brianna Hernandez-Silva (born April 13, 1999) is an American international flag football player. She has represented the United States national team since 2025. After playing college softball for the Southern Nevada Coyotes, she played college flag football for the Kansas Wesleyan Coyotes and the Keiser Seahawks.

== Early life ==
Hernandez-Silva grew up in Las Vegas, the daughter of Brian Hernandez and Christy Silva. She played multiple sports at Bonanza High School, earning letters in volleyball, flag football, and softball. In 2017, she was named second-team all-state in flag football after throwing for 1,733 yards and 22 touchdowns and rushing for 2,671 yards and 26 touchdowns. Her flag football jersey number 16 was retired by the school where she was named team MVP three times. With college scholarships not yet available in flag football, she enrolled in the College of Southern Nevada to play college softball. She spent one season with the Coyotes in 2019 and had 8 runs batted in (RBI) in 42 games.

== College career ==
When the National Association of Intercollegiate Athletics (NAIA) announced sanctioning for flag football, Hernandez-Silva transferred to Kansas Wesleyan University before their debut season with the sport in 2021. She was named the Kansas Collegiate Athletic Conference (KCAC) Offensive Player of the Year in both 2022 and 2023. She was also named Co-KCAC Player of the Year in 2022 while being named first-team All-KCAC at quarterback and second-team All-KCAC at safety. She was named second-team All-KCAC at quarterback in 2023.

After playing three seasons at Kansas Wesleyan and appearing at the invitational The One Flag Championship, she transferred to Keiser University in Florida for a fourth and final season in 2024, joining United States national teamers Kennedy Foster, Ashlea Klam, and Brenna Ramirez. She was named first-team All-Sun Conference at running back after catching 96 passes for 826 yards and 14 touchdowns. She helped the Seahawks to the NAIA national title game, where she caught a touchdown in the loss to Ottawa University.

== National team career ==
Hernandez-Silva made the United States national team as an alternate for the 2024 IFAF Women's Flag Football World Championship in Finland. She made the final roster and made her international debut at the 2025 World Games in China. She mostly played defense but also caught a touchdown pass from Maci Joncich in the opening game against the hosts. She earned a silver medal after the United States lost 26–21 to Mexico in the final. She settled for bronze at the 2025 IFAF Americas Continental Flag Football Championship in Panama, throwing a touchdown in the loss to Mexico in the semifinals before defeating the hosts in the third place game.
