= Tania Rincón (flag football) =

Mexican flag football player

Personal information
- Education: UNAM
- Height: 1.64 m (5 ft 5 in)

Sport
- Sport: Flag football
- Position: Quarterback
- College team: Pumas UNAM
- Team: Osas de Monterrey
Medal record
Women's flag football
Representing Mexico
World Games
Gold medal – first place	2025 Chengdu	Team
IFAF World Championship
Silver medal – second place	2024 Lahti	Team
IFAF Americas Continental Championship
Gold medal – first place	2025 Penonomé	Team

Tania Rincón Samperio (born c. 2001) is a Mexican flag football player who plays as a quarterback for the Mexico women's national flag football team. She won a gold medal at the 2025 World Games and a silver medal at the 2024 World Championship.

== Early life ==
Rincón began playing flag football at the age of six, initially with a team in Ciudad Nezahualcóyotl before she joined another team in Jardín Balbuena. Her mother also played the sport.

Rincón attended the National Autonomous University of Mexico (UNAM), where she played college flag football as a quarterback. She helped the Pumas win back-to-back gold medals at the Universiada Nacional in 2022 and 2023, followed by a bronze in 2024. She also helped the team win bronze at the 2025 national collegiate championships.

== Career ==
Rincón played for the Pioners LH México, (Note: The Pioners LH México are a Mexican affiliate of the Spanish club L'Hospitalet Pioners.) then members of the AFFEMEX, in 2023 and 2024. In its debut season, the team won the 2023 AFFEMEX Big Ten spring championship. Rincón played in the inaugural AFFEMEX Tazón de Campeonas in 2024, a super cup contested between the league's spring and fall season champions. She later played for the Bulldogs of the Liga Mexicana de Tocho (LMT).

In 2025, Rincón joined the Osas de Monterrey for the second season of the LFA Torneo de Flag Football Femenil Profesional, a professional flag football league sponsored by the Liga de Fútbol Americano Profesional (LFA). She helped the team to a runner-up finish.

=== National team ===
In December 2023, Rincón was named to a provisional squad for the Mexico women's national team in preparation for the 2024 IFAF Women's Flag Football World Championship. She was named to the final roster the following August.

Rincón made her international debut for Mexico at the 2024 World Championship in Finland. She threw four touchdown passes, and caught another from fellow quarterback Diana Flores, in a 42–6 win over Israel in the round of 16. Rincón threw a touchdown pass to Andrea Martínez in Mexico's 35–20 quarterfinal win over Canada. She then recorded three touchdowns (two rushing, one passing) in a 40–31 win over Japan in the semifinals. Rincón helped her team to a silver medal following a 31–18 defeat to the United States in the final. Her positional versatility, agility, and arm strength were later praised by ESPN Deportes, who described her as "one of the surprises Mexico presented to the world in Finland".

Rincón starred in a Peter Berg-directed commercial which aired immediately after the Super Bowl LIX halftime show in February 2025 as part of the "NFL Flag 50" campaign, aimed at celebrating and promoting women's flag football ahead of its debut at the 2028 Summer Olympics. She spoke about the extra motivation that came with the opportunity to represent Mexico at the Olympics.

Rincón has been described as a potential successor or heir apparent to legendary Mexican quarterback Diana Flores. The two are employed in dual-quarterback sets. In 2025, Rincón said: "We complement each other well. We are both equally versatile. We can do incredible things."

Rincón was named to Mexico's 12-woman roster for the 2025 World Games in Chengdu, China. After going undefeated in group stage play, she threw five touchdown passes – including three to Ana Aguayo in a 40–0 win over hosts China in the quarterfinals, followed by three more touchdown passes in Mexico's 25–13 semifinal win over Canada, which brought her to nine touchdown passes for the tournament. In the final, Rincón scored two touchdowns (one passing, one receiving) in a 26–21 win over the United States, helping Mexico defend its gold medal from the previous Games.

The following month, Rincón represented Mexico at the 2025 IFAF Americas Continental Flag Football Championship in Panama. She caught two touchdown passes from Flores in a 26–13 semifinal win over the United States. Rincón then threw a touchdown pass in Mexico's 12–0 win over Canada in the final to secure the gold medal. (Note: Due to inclement weather, the women's final was suspended and Mexico were named champions as they led 12–0.)

== Personal life ==
Rincón studied psychology at UNAM.
