= Ana Aguayo =

Mexican flag football player (born 1993)

Personal information
- Full name: Ana Consuelo Aguayo Elías
- Nickname: Anaconda
- Born: 3 April 1993 (age 33)
- Home town: Hermosillo, Sonora, Mexico
- Education: ITESM (Lic.)
- Height: 1.78 m (5 ft 10 in)

Sport
- Sport: Flag football
- Position: Wide receiver
- Club: Yaks de Hermosillo
- Team: Osas de Monterrey
Medal record
Women's flag football
Representing Mexico
World Games
Gold medal – first place	2025 Chengdu	Team
IFAF World Championship
Silver medal – second place	2024 Lahti	Team
IFAF Americas Continental Championship
Silver medal – second place	2023 Charlotte	Team
Women's basketball
Representing Mexico
FIBA U16 Women's Centrobasket
Gold medal – first place	2009 León	Team

Ana Consuelo Aguayo Elías (born 3 April 1993) is a Mexican flag football and basketball player. She plays as a wide receiver for the Mexico women's national flag football team and won a gold medal at the 2025 World Games.

Standing at 1.78 m (5 ft 10 in) tall, Aguayo usually has a height and physicality advantage over most opponents in women's flag football.

== Early life and basketball career ==
Aguayo was born on 3 April 1993, and is a native of Hermosillo, Sonora. She began playing sports around the age of seven, participating in athletics and basketball growing up. Consuelo attended the Colegio Americano del Pacífico in Hermosillo. She represented the Mexico women's national under-16 basketball team at the 2009 FIBA U16 Women's Centrobasket, helping her team win the gold medal after averaging 10.3 points, 5.3 rebounds, and 2.5 assists per game. Aguayo then played at the 2009 FIBA Americas Under-16 Championship for Women, where she averaged nine points, 2.3 rebounds, and 1.3 assists per game. Mexico finished in fifth place.

Aguayo played college basketball at the Monterrey Institute of Technology and Higher Education (ITESM), initially at the Sonora Norte campus, and later at the Guadalajara campus. She participated in the inaugural Midnight Basketball Classic tournament in Hermosillo in 2018, and helped Hermosillo BXT win the ADEMEBA Sonora women's state title in 2021.

In mid-2025, Aguayo signed with the Nogales Guinda of the Circuito de Baloncesto del Pacífico Femenil (CIBAPAC Femenil) ahead of the 2025 CIBAPAC Femenil season.

== Flag football career ==
After graduating from ITESM in 2017, Aguayo started playing flag football for the Yaks of the Liga Municipal de Hermosillo, which she had previously been unable to do while on a basketball scholarship. Over the years, she became one of the best players in the state while playing the wide receiver position. Following her performance at the FMFA club national championships in Mexico City in November 2022, Aguayo was named to a preliminary roster for the Mexico women's national flag football team, to which she expressed surprise. Aguayo told El Imparcial that she felt "super proud, super privileged" for the chance to represent her country as well as her home state of Sonora.

In 2025, Aguayo joined the Osas de Monterrey for the second season of LFA Flag Femenil, a professional flag football league sponsored by the Liga de Fútbol Americano Profesional (LFA).

=== National team ===
Aguayo was named to the final national team roster for the 2023 IFAF Americas Continental Championship in Charlotte, North Carolina. She helped her team reach the final, catching a touchdown pass from Diana Flores in a 26–21 loss to the United States. Aguayo was called up again for the 2024 IFAF Women's World Championship in Finland. Ahead of the competition, she and teammate Silvia Contreras were described by American Football International as "two players who have proven to be essential in the offensive game with their ability to create spectacular plays". Aguayo caught a touchdown pass from Flores in a 40–31 win over Japan in the semifinals. She was later described as Mexico's most reliable receiver at the tournament by ESPN Deportes after she helped her team to a silver medal following a 31–18 defeat to the United States in the final.

Aguayo was named to Mexico's final 12-woman roster for the 2025 World Games in Chengdu, China. She scored five touchdowns in six games, including a pair of touchdown receptions on passes from Flores and Tania Rincón in their 25–13 semifinal win over Canada. Aguayo made several key catches in the final, helping Mexico defeat the United States, 26–21, to capture the gold medal.

== Personal life ==
Aguayo earned her Licentiate degree in architecture from ITESM. After graduation, she worked in construction. Aguayo has spoken about how playing sports has given her the confidence to operate in a male-dominated industry. She considers Kobe Bryant an inspiration.

Upon her return from the 2025 World Games in China, Aguayo was surprised by fans at the Hermosillo International Airport and honored by the Liga de Flag y Futbol Americano de Hermosillo (Liffamh) for her "participation as a key piece" of the national team.
