= Deliah Autry-Jones =

American flag football player (born 1995)

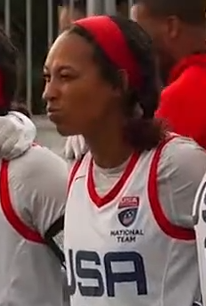
- Autry-Jones in 2023

Personal information
- Born: August 14, 1995 (age 31) Tampa, Florida, U.S.
- Height: 5 ft 5 in (165 cm)

Sport
- Country: United States
- Sport: Flag football
- Position: Defensive back, wide receiver
Medal record
Women's flag football
Representing United States
World Games
Silver medal – second place	2022 Birmingham	Team
Silver medal – second place	2025 Chengdu	Team
IFAF World Championship
Gold medal – first place	2021 Jerusalem	Team
Gold medal – first place	2024 Lahti	Team
IFAF Americas Continental Championship
Gold medal – first place	2023 Charlotte	Team
Bronze medal – third place	2025 Penonomé	Team

Deliah Autry-Jones (born August 14, 1995) is an American international flag football player. She has represented the United States national team since 2021, winning two IFAF Women's Flag Football World Championships and two World Games silver medals.

== Early life ==
Autry-Jones was born and raised in Tampa, Florida. She watched her brother's tackle football practices growing up and often threw a football with her father, though she didn't have the opportunity to play the sport herself. She was finally able to play flag football when she got to Robinson High School, where she also joined the basketball and volleyball teams. She later said flag football "gave me a purpose in my life". In flag football, she was named first-team all-state twice and was named the Hillsborough County Player of the Year as a senior after throwing for 36 touchdowns and 1,800 yards in 2013. With colleges yet to offer flag football as a varsity sport, she played for the club team at the University of South Florida from 2013 to 2016. During college, she also coached flag football and other sports with the Tampa parks and recreation department. She then attended Florida A&M University, again playing for the club team, and earned a Doctor of Physical Therapy in 2020.

== National team career ==
Autry-Jones made her debut for the United States national team at the 2021 IFAF Women's Flag Football World Championship in Jerusalem, helping the US defend their world title by defeating Mexico 31–21 in the final. US head coach Christopher Lankford said that her ability to play multiple positions helped her earn a place on the team. She settled for silver at the 2022 World Games in Birmingham, Alabama, after losing 39–6 to Mexico in the final. She won her second gold medal with the US at the 2023 IFAF Americas Continental Flag Football Championship in Charlotte, North Carolina, defeating Mexico 26–21 in the final.

By her fourth year on the team, Autry-Jones was considered the captain of the US defensive unit. She was also open about her mental health as a competitive athlete, taking care of that side of her game for the first time that year. She helped lead the US to their third consecutive world title at the 2024 IFAF Women's Flag Football World Championship in Finland, winning 31–18 against Mexico in the final. She then caught a team-high four interceptions at the 2025 World Games in China, including one in the 26–21 loss to Mexico in the final, joining quarterback Vanita Krouch as the only players from the previous World Games squad to earn a second silver medal. Another loss to Mexico consigned the US to bronze at the 2025 IFAF Americas Continental Flag Football Championship in Panama.

== Personal life ==
Autry-Jones founded Camp13, a non-profit organization hosting flag football clinics for girls in Tampa Bay, in 2020. She has also worked as an assistant coach for flag football at her alma mater Robinson High School. She has also served as the southeast regional director in a development role for USA Football. Outside of flag football, she works as a pediatric physical therapist.
