= Laneah Bryan =

American flag football player (born 1996)

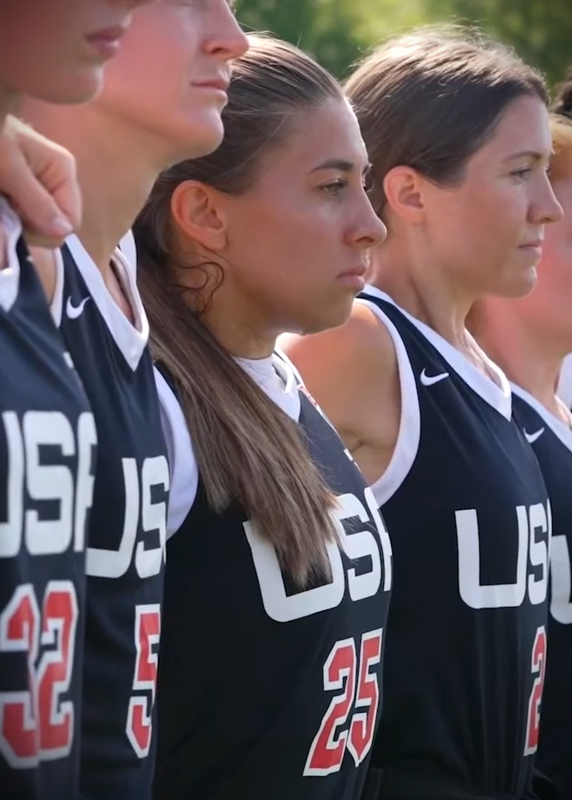
- Bryan (#25) in 2023

Personal information
- Born: May 23, 1996 (age 30) Weatherford, Texas, U.S.
- Home town: El Paso, Texas, U.S.
- Height: 5 ft 6 in (168 cm)

Sport
- Country: United States
- Sport: Flag football
- Position: Defensive back, wide receiver
Medal record
Women's flag football
Representing United States
World Games
Silver medal – second place	2025 Chengdu	Team
IFAF World Championship
Gold medal – first place	2024 Lahti	Team
IFAF Americas Continental Championship
Gold medal – first place	2023 Charlotte	Team
Bronze medal – third place	2025 Penonomé	Team

Laneah Bryan (born May 23, 1996) is an American international flag football player. She has represented the United States national team since 2023, winning the 2024 IFAF Women's Flag Football World Championship. She previously played college basketball for the New Mexico Lobos.

== Early life ==
Born in Weatherford, Texas, Bryan played high school basketball at Volcano Vista High School in Albuquerque, New Mexico, for two years before moving to Franklin High School in El Paso, Texas. She was named second-team all-state as a sophomore at Volcano Vista after helping lead the team to the 2012 NMAA 5A state championship. She was named the District 1-5A MVP as a senior at Franklin, after averaging 20.8 points per game and winning the district title. She grew up as a fan of the Dallas Cowboys and has said she would have wanted to play football when she was young if she had the opportunity.

Bryan accepted a scholarship to play college basketball for the New Mexico Lobos from 2014 to 2018. Under head coaches Yvonne Sanchez and Mike Bradbury, she played rotation minutes as a defensive-minded guard and averaged 4.0 points per game in her final three seasons. She scored a career-high 14 points against Air Force, going 3-for-4 from three, as a junior in 2017.

== Flag football career ==
Bryan began playing flag football after college with her local league in El Paso. Within five years, she earned a place on the United States national team and made her international debut at the 2023 IFAF Americas Continental Flag Football Championship in Charlotte. She caught seven interceptions at the tournament including one in the 26–21 win over Mexico in the final. She broke her ankle after the tournament but recovered in time for the next major competition.

Bryan won her second gold medal with the US at the 2024 IFAF Women's Flag Football World Championship in Finland, grabbing an interception in the 31–18 win against Mexico in the final. Later in the year, she and Madison Fulford joined the Caudillas de Chihuahua in Mexico and helped the team reach the championship game in the inaugural Torneo Nacional de Flag Femenil. She earned a silver medal at the 2025 World Games in China after losing 26–21 to Mexico in the final. She settled for bronze at the 2025 IFAF Americas Continental Flag Football Championship in Panama, defeating the hosts after a semifinal loss to Mexico.

== Personal life ==
Bryan is the daughter of Sharon and Shawn Bryan and has four siblings. Outside of flag football, she founded two businesses in El Paso, MountainStar Solar and GOAT Roofing & Construction. She has also coached at flag football camps.
