= Sara Parker =

Canadian flag football player (born 2000)

Personal information
- Born: March 11, 2000 (age 26) Greenfield Park, Quebec, Canada

Sport
- Country: Canada
- Sport: Flag football
- Position: Quarterback
Medal record
Women's flag football
Representing Canada
World Games
Bronze medal – third place	2025 Chengdu	Team
IFAF World Championship
Gold medal – first place	2026 Düsseldorf	Team
IFAF Americas Continental Championship
Silver medal – second place	2025 Penonomé	Team

Sara Parker (born March 11, 2000) is a Canadian flag football player. She plays as a quarterback and is a member of the Canada national team.

== Flag football career ==
When she turned 15, Parker began playing flag football since it was played in the spring. She started the women's flag football programs at Champlain College Saint-Lambert and Concordia University, the former where was inducted in school's Hall of Fame.

Parker competed in the 2024 IFAF Women's Flag Football World Championship, where she helped the team finished in fifth place and qualify for the 2025 World Games. At the 2025 World Games, she contributed to Canada winning a bronze after defeating Austria in the score of 38-20. The following month, she took part in 2025 IFAF Americas Continental Women's Flag Football Championship, where her team won the silver medal.

In August 2026, Parker contributed to the Canadian squad that won the gold medal in the 2026 IFAF Women's Flag Football World Championship, enabling the team to qualify the 2028 Summer Olympics in Los Angeles.
