= Caroline Moquin-Joubert =

Canadian flag football player (born 1999)

Personal information
- Born: 1999 (age 26–27) Saint-Lambert, Quebec, Canada
Ice hockey career
- Position: Forward
- Shoots: Right
- Played for: Concordia University

Sport
- Country: Canada
- Sport: Flag football
- Position: Wide receiver
Medal record
Women's flag football
Representing Canada
World Games
Bronze medal – third place	2025 Chengdu	Team
IFAF World Championship
Gold medal – first place	2026 Düsseldorf	Team
IFAF Americas Continental Championship
Silver medal – second place	2025 Penonomé	Team

Caroline Moquin-Joubert (born 1999) is a Canadian flag football player. She plays as a wide receiver and is a member of the Canada national team. She also played her college ice hockey career with Concordia University in Montréal.

== College career ==
Moquin-Joubert played for the Concordia Stingers' women's flag football and ice hockey team for four seasons, the latter with whom she helped them win the U Sports national championship in 2022 and 2024.

== Flag football career ==
Moquin-Joubert competed in the 2024 IFAF Women's Flag Football World Championship, where she contributed to the team finishing in fifth place and qualify for the 2025 World Games. In August 2025, at the aforementioned World Games, she was part of the Canada squad that won the bronze after defeating Austria in the score of 38-20. The following month, she took part in IFAF Americas Continental Women's Flag Football Championship, where her team won the silver medal.

In August 2026, Moquin-Joubert contributed to the Canadian squad that won the gold medal in the IFAF Women's Flag Football World Championship, enabling the team to qualify the 2028 Summer Olympics in Los Angeles.
