= Maci Joncich =

American flag football player (born 2006)

Personal information
- Born: 2006 (age 19–20)
- Home town: Henderson, Nevada, U.S.
- Height: 5 ft 4 in (163 cm)

Sport
- Country: United States
- Sport: Flag football
- Position: Wide receiver, quarterback
Medal record
Women's flag football
Representing United States
World Games
Silver medal – second place	2025 Chengdu	Team
IFAF World Championship
Gold medal – first place	2024 Lahti	Team
IFAF Americas Continental Championship
Bronze medal – third place	2025 Penonomé	Team

Maci Joncich (born 2006) is an American international flag football player. She debuted for the United States national team at age 17 in 2024, becoming the youngest player in team history and winning the 2024 IFAF Women's Flag Football World Championship.

== Early life ==
Joncich grew up in Henderson, Nevada, and began playing flag football with her older brothers when she was six. She was the only girl in the area league at the time. She also played basketball, soccer, and tennis growing up. With flag football sanctioned as a girls' varsity sport in Nevada, she played three seasons at Coronado High School. She also traveled with the Apex Predators. As a senior, she was named the Class 4A Player of the Year after leading Coronado to a 20–2 record and the 2024 state championship. She finished the season with 5,216 passing yards for 81 touchdowns and added 2,060 yards and 21 touchdowns on the ground. She struggled in the state title game with one touchdown pass against two interceptions but also rushed for three touchdowns in the victory.

Joncich went on to play club flag football at the University of Florida. She led the Gators to the NIRSA national championship as a freshman in 2024, catching 12 passes for three touchdowns in the 32–0 win over Central Florida in the final. She was named tournament MVP. She helped win a second consecutive NIRSA national title as a sophomore in 2025.

== Flag Football Career ==
Joncich represented the United States at the 2022 15U and 2023 17U Junior International Cups, winning gold medals at both events. Soon after graduating from high school, she made the senior United States roster for the 2024 IFAF Women's Flag Football World Championship in Finland, becoming the youngest player in team history at 17 years old. She joined longtime quarterback Vanita Krouch as the squad's number two passer. Playing both quarterback and wide receiver, she completed 26-of-32 passes for 239 yards for six touchdowns, caught 12 passes for 99 yards and three touchdowns, and rushed for 113 yards and three touchdowns during the tournament. She rushed for a touchdown and threw for a touchdown in the 31–18 win over Mexico in the final.

Joncich earned a silver medal at the 2025 World Games in China, where she threw for six touchdowns, rushed for a touchdown, and caught two touchdowns, but lost 26–21 to Mexico in the final. She settled for bronze at the 2025 IFAF Americas Continental Flag Football Championship in Panama, throwing a touchdown in the loss to Mexico in the semifinals before defeating the hosts in the third place game.

In 2026 Joncich transferred to Cal Poly for the Mustangs' inaugural season of NCAA Women's Flag Football. Cal Poly is one of the first 10 NCAA D1 schools to sponsor Flag Football as a Varsity NCAA D1 sport.
