= Sabrina Gervais =

Canadian flag football player (born 1989)

Personal information
- Born: November 9, 1989 (age 36) Maskinongé, Quebec, Canada

Sport
- Country: Canada
- Sport: Flag football
- Position: Defensive back
Medal record
Women's flag football
Representing Canada
World Games
Bronze medal – third place	2025 Chengdu	Team
IFAF World Championship
Gold medal – first place	2014 Grosseto	Team
Gold medal – first place	2026 Düsseldorf	Team
IFAF Americas Continental Championship
Silver medal – second place	2025 Penonomé	Team

Sabrina Gervais (born November 9, 1989) is a Canadian flag football player. She plays as a defensive back and is a member of the Canada national team, winning two IFAF Flag Football World Championships and a World Games bronze medal.

== Flag football career ==
Gervais was part of the Canada squad that won the 2014 IFAF Women's Flag Football World Championship. She was also part of the Canada squad that finished in fourth place in the 2016 IFAF Women's Flag Football World Championship.

Gervais competed in the 2024 IFAF Women's Flag Football World Championship, where she contributed to the team finishing in fifth place and qualify for the 2025 World Games. In August 2025, at the aforementioned World Games, she was part of the Canada squad that won the bronze after defeating Austria in the score of 38–20. The following month, she took part in IFAF Americas Continental Women's Flag Football Championship, where her team won the silver medal.

In August 2026, Gervais was part of the Canadian squad that won the gold medal in the IFAF Women's Flag Football World Championship, enabling the team to qualify the 2028 Summer Olympics in Los Angeles.

== Personal life ==
Gervais is a mother of twins and also works as an osteopath and kinesiologist.
