= Ashley Edwards =

American flag football player (born 1989)

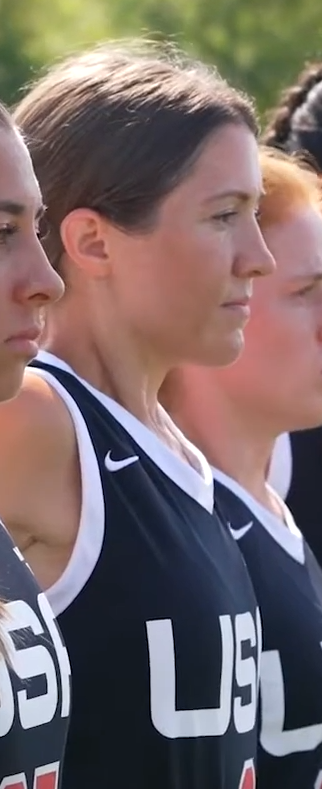
- Edwards in 2023

Personal information
- Born: 1989 (age 36–37)
- Home town: San Antonio, Texas, U.S.
- Height: 5 ft 6 in (168 cm)

Sport
- Country: United States
- Sport: Flag football
- Position: Defensive back, wide receiver
Medal record
Women's flag football
Representing United States
World Games
Silver medal – second place	2025 Chengdu	Team
IFAF World Championship
Gold medal – first place	2024 Lahti	Team
IFAF Americas Continental Championship
Gold medal – first place	2023 Charlotte	Team
Bronze medal – third place	2025 Penonomé	Team

Ashley Edwards (born 1989) is an American international flag football player. She has represented the United States national team since 2023, winning the 2024 IFAF Women's Flag Football World Championship.

== Early life ==
Edwards grew up in San Antonio, Texas. She attended Central High School in San Angelo, Texas, where she played basketball. She loved football when she was young and played flag football recreationally in college before joining a local co-ed league in San Antonio. She eventually played at national tournaments and began pursuing the United States national team after hearing that such a team existed "really ignited something in me".

== National team career ==
Edwards made her debut for the United States national team in 2023, winning the 2023 IFAF Americas Continental Flag Football Championship in Charlotte, North Carolina, as she helped the US defeat Mexico 26–21 in the final. She then helped the US to their third consecutive world title at the 2024 IFAF Women's Flag Football World Championship in Finland, winning 31–18 against Mexico in the final. She earned a silver medal at 2025 World Games in China after a 26–21 loss to Mexico in the final. Another loss to Mexico led the US to win bronze at the 2025 IFAF Americas Continental Flag Football Championship in Panama.

== Personal life ==
Edwards married her wife, Kelsey Krueger Edwards, in 2022. She often trains with US teammate Madison Fulford.
