= Amber Clark-Robinson =

American flag football player (born 1993)

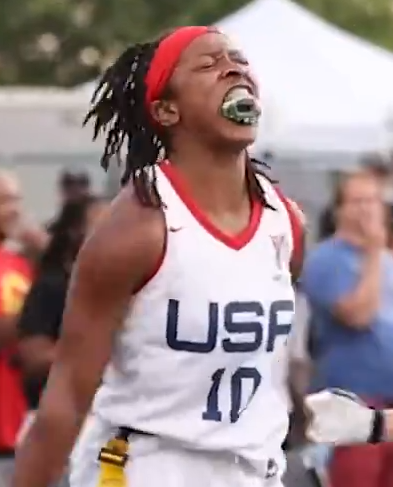
- Clark-Robinson in 2023

Personal information
- Born: Amber Shantel Clark; April 3, 1993 (age 33) Greenville, North Carolina, U.S.
- Height: 5 ft 6 in (168 cm)
- Football career

No. 10 – United States
- Title: Defensive back

Career history

Playing
- Atlanta Steam (2016–2019); United States (2023–)

Coaching
- Saint Mary (KS) (2023–)
Medal record
World Games
Silver medal – second place	2025 Chengdu	Team
IFAF World Championship
Gold medal – first place	2024 Lahti	Team
IFAF Americas Continental Championship
Gold medal – first place	2023 Charlotte	Team
Bronze medal – third place	2025 Penonomé	Team

Amber Clark-Robinson (née Clark; born April 3, 1993) is an American international flag football player. She has represented the United States national team since 2023, winning the 2024 IFAF Women's Flag Football World Championship. She has also been the head women's flag football coach at the University of Saint Mary since 2023. She previously played tackle football in the Legends Football League (LFL) and was a long jumper and triple jumper for the North Carolina Tar Heels.

== Early life ==
Clark-Robinson was born in Greenville, North Carolina, and grew up in Winterville, North Carolina. She attended South Central High School in Winterville, where she played for the track and field, volleyball, and basketball teams. She won three NCHSAA state track titles in the 4 × 400 meter relay and led the basketball team to the state title in 2011, becoming the school's all-time assist leader. She said she wanted to play football after watching her brothers and cousins in the sport, but her parents did not allow her because she was a girl, and she played only occasional powderpuff games or pick-up games at recess. She went on to join the North Carolina Tar Heels track and field team as a long jumper and triple jumper. She set personal bests of 18 feet 10 inches (5.74 m) in long jump and 39 feet 9 inches (12.12 m) in triple jump.

== Playing career ==
Clark-Robinson began playing tackle football after college with the Atlanta Steam of the Legends Football League (LFL). She trained with former NFL wide receiver Terrance Copper before making the team as a wideout but soon moved to defensive back, where she flourished. She played four seasons with the Steam from 2016 to 2019, earning nominations for the league's Most Valuable Player and Defensive Player of the Year awards.

After the LFL shut down during the COVID-19 pandemic, she transitioned to flag football. She unsuccessfully tried out for the United States national team in 2021, then suffered an medial collateral ligament tear in her knee before the tryouts in 2022. She finally made the national team roster for the 2023 IFAF Americas Continental Flag Football Championship in Charlotte, North Carolina, where she recorded five interceptions in six games. She grabbed the championship-sealing interception in the 26–21 win over Mexico in the final.

She recorded 27 flag pulls, 11 passes defensed, and one interception in eight games at the 2024 IFAF Women's Flag Football World Championship in Finland. The United States won 31–18 against Mexico in the final. She helped the team reach the final at the 2025 World Games in China, earning a silver medal after the 26–21 loss to Mexico in the final.

== Coaching career ==
Clark-Robinson became the head women's flag football coach at the University of Saint Mary, a National Association of Intercollegiate Athletics (NAIA) program in Leavenworth, Kansas, before the 2023 season.

== Personal life ==
Clark-Robinson is the daughter of Michael and Machell Clark. She was named to USA Football's board of directors in January 2024.
