= Victoria Chávez =

Mexican flag football player

Personal information
- Born: Chihuahua City

Sport
- Country: México
- Sport: Flag football
- Position: Wide receiver / defensive back
Medal record
Women's flag football
Representing Mexico
World Games
Gold medal – first place	2025 Chengdu	Team
IFAF World Championship
Silver medal – second place	2024 Lahti	Team
Bronze medal – third place	2026 Düsseldorf	Team
IFAF Americas Continental Championship
Gold medal – first place	2025 Penonomé	Team

Victoria Chávez López is a Mexican flag football player. She plays as a wide receiver or defensive back and is a member of the Mexico national team. In 2025, she became the first Mexican to be awarded the "World Games Athlete of the Year 2025" award, given by the International World Games Association.

== Early life and education ==
Chávez migrated to Mexico City to pursue her university studies and further her athletic career. She graduated with a degree in communication and is currently a master's student in Innovation for Business Development at the Monterrey Institute of Technology and Higher Education.

== Flag football career ==
From an early age, Chávez showed an interest in sports; however, when she turned 15, she began playing flag football, first as a hobby and then more seriously. It was then that she received an educational offer from the Monterrey Institute of Technology to study.

For three years, Chávez played for the Borregos Santa Fe team at her alma mater, winning three gold and one silver medal in national championships of the National Student Sports Commission of Private Institutions. In 2019, she made her first attempt to join the Mexican women's flag football team, but it wasn't until 2024 that she finally made the team after recovering from a knee injury.

In August 2025, during the final of the 2025 World Games against the United States, Chávez scored the touchdown that gave them the championship with three seconds remaining on the clock and a score of 26–21. She also helped the team remain undefeated during the tournament, which positioned them at number 1 in the 2025-2026 world rankings of the International Federation of American Football (IFAF). For her performances, Chávez was awarded the World Games Athlete of the Year award, presented by the International World Games Association, becoming the first Mexican to win the award. The following month, she took part in 2025 IFAF Americas Continental Women's Flag Football Championship, where her team won the championship.

In early 2026, Chávez helped the Borregos Salvajes win the CONADEIP National Championship, in which she was named MVP. In August, she was part of the Mexican squad that won the bronze medal in the 2026 IFAF Women's Flag Football World Championship.
