= London Jenkins =

American flag football player (born 2006)

Personal information
- Born: May 1, 2006 (age 20)
- Home town: Jacksonville, Florida, United States
- Height: 5 ft 3 in (160 cm)

Sport
- Country: United States
- Sport: Flag football
- Position: Wide receiver, defensive back
Medal record
Women's flag football
Representing United States
World Games
Silver medal – second place	2025 Chengdu	Team
IFAF Americas Continental Championship
Bronze medal – third place	2025 Penonomé	Team

London Jenkins (born May 1, 2006) is an American international flag football player. She has represented the United States national team since 2025. She plays college flag football for Florida Gateway College, winning the NJCAA national championship as a freshman in 2025.

== Early life ==
Jenkins grew up in Jacksonville, Florida. She played flag football with boys at the YMCA when she was seven or eight but did not have the opportunity to play organized flag football at the time. She instead played basketball and averaged 20.1 points per game as a junior at Fleming Island High School, earning college scholarship offers. After being recruited by quarterback Mykayla Maddox, she joined the Fleming Island flag football team as a junior and caught 18 touchdowns for the Class 2A state runners-up in 2023. As a senior, she was named The Florida Times-Union and All-News4JAX Player of the Year after displaying her ability on both sides of the ball with 5 touchdown catches, 5 touchdown passes, 22 touchdowns rushing, and 14 interceptions. Upon her high school graduation, the Times-Union described Jenkins as "one of the faces of flag football in Florida and beyond".

She enrolled in Florida Gateway College to play for their NJCAA flag football program. She helped lead the Timberwolves to their third consecutive NJCAA national title as a freshman in 2025, returning three interceptions for touchdowns in the 68–13 win over Daytona State.

== National team career ==
Jenkins debuted for the United States national team at the 2025 World Games in China. She caught three touchdowns at the tournament and earned a silver medal after the 26–21 loss to Mexico in the final. She settled for bronze at the 2025 IFAF Americas Continental Flag Football Championship in Panama, defeating the hosts after a semifinal loss to Mexico.
