= Diana Flores =

Mexican flag football player

Personal information
- Full name: Diana Alejandra Flores Arenas
- Born: September 28, 1997 (age 29) Mexico City

Sport
- Country: México
- Sport: Flag football
- Position: Quarterback
Medal record
Women's flag football
Representing Mexico
World Games
Gold medal – first place	2022 Birmingham	Team
Gold medal – first place	2025 Chengdu	Team
IFAF World Championship
Silver medal – second place	2021 Jerusalem	Team
Silver medal – second place	2024 Lahti	Team
Bronze medal – third place	2016 Miami	Team
Bronze medal – third place	2026 Düsseldorf	Team
IFAF Americas Continental Championship
Gold medal – first place	2025 Penonomé	Team
Silver medal – second place	2023 Charlotte	Team

Diana Alejandra Flores Arenas (born September 28, 1997) is a Mexican flag football player. She is a quarterback and captain of the Mexico national team.

== Flag football career ==
Flores started playing flag football when she was eight years old. From an early age she joined important female leagues, among them the "Tocho Bandera" team of the Águilas Blancas of the Instituto Politécnico Nacional. In 2012, at the age of 14, she was called up to lead the North Penn High School team in Pennsylvania, United States, where they were crowned NFL regional champions.

In 2014, at the age of 16, she joined the Mexico national team that contended in that year's IFAF Flag Football World Championship in Grosseto, Italy. She became the youngest player to compete in an international tournament. In 2016, at the age of 18, she participated in the IFAF Flag Football World Championship held in Miami, Florida. The team won the bronze medal. Flores also played for the Mexico national team in Panama in 2018, and Jerusalem in 2021.

As quarterback, she took the team to gold at the 2022 World Games. She led the team to a record of six wins and 0 losses. In the final, she completed 20 of 28 pass attempts for 210 yards and four touchdowns in a 39–6 win over the United States.

She played the Pro Bowl in Las Vegas in February 2023 where she played offense.

Flores is an ambassador for the NFL and during Super Bowl LVII she starred in the commercial Run With it, promoting flag football as an Olympic sport in 2028. The cast for the ad included flag football players Bella Rasmussen and Vanita Krouch, as well as Billie Jean King, and MrBeast.

== Education ==
Flores studied marketing and communications at the Tecnológico de Monterrey, Santa Fe Campus.
