= Ashlea Klam =

American flag football player (born 2004)

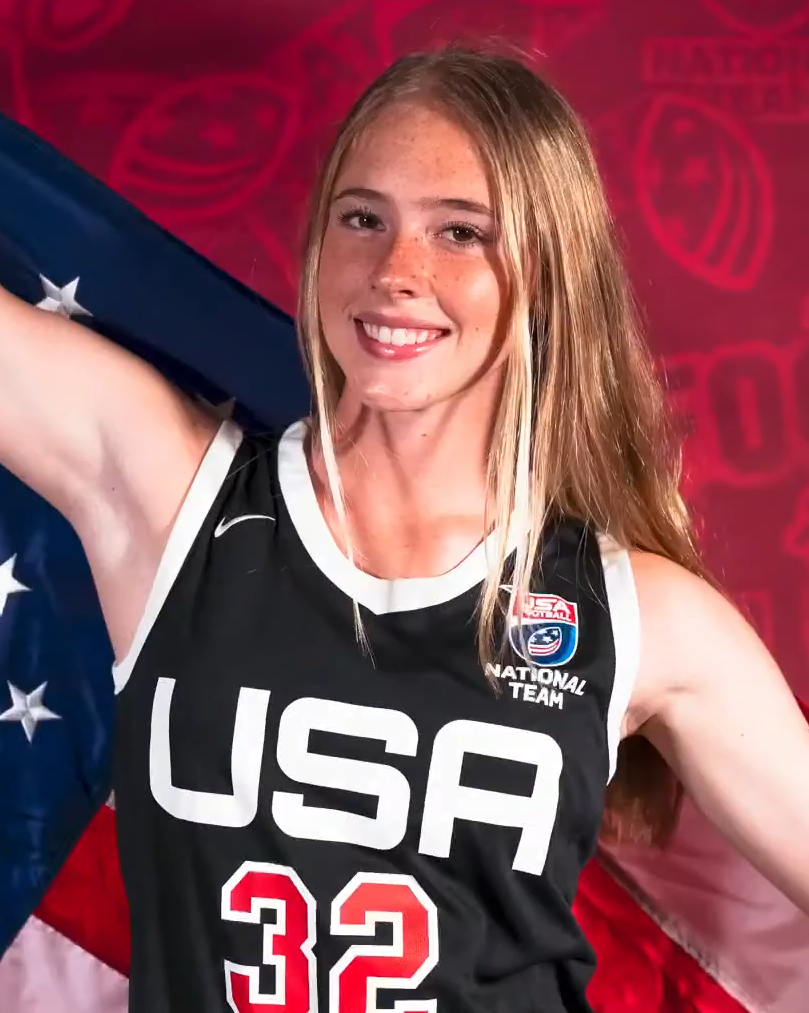
- Klam in 2023

Personal information
- Born: 2004 (age 21–22)
- Home town: Austin, Texas, U.S.
- Height: 5 ft 8 in (173 cm)

Sport
- Country: United States
- Sport: Flag football
- Position: Center, defensive back
Medal record
Women's flag football
Representing United States
World Games
Silver medal – second place	2025 Chengdu	Team
IFAF World Championship
Gold medal – first place	2024 Lahti	Team
IFAF Americas Continental Championship
Gold medal – first place	2023 Charlotte	Team
Bronze medal – third place	2025 Penonomé	Team

Ashlea Klam (born October 2004) is an American international flag football player. She has represented the United States national team since 2023, winning the 2024 IFAF Women's Flag Football World Championship. She plays college flag football for the Keiser Seahawks.

== Early life ==
Born to Amber and Jason Klam and raised in Austin, Texas, Klam started playing flag football at age six after seeing her brother Peyton play. She began to play competitively the year after, initially playing on boys' teams. She also excelled at a number of sports as a youngster: soccer, volleyball, basketball, baseball, softball, and track and field.

== Flag football career ==
Klam received a scholarship to study sports management and play flag football for Keiser University in Florida.

She played for the Texas Fury club based in Austin, Texas, created by her parents as a girls-only flag football team that has expanded to eight different teams for different age groups.

In 2023, she became the youngest player on the United States women's national flag football team, at the age of 19. She was a member of the American team which won the 2024 IFAF Women's Flag Football World Championship.

She settled for bronze at the 2025 IFAF Americas Continental Flag Football Championship in Panama, catching a touchdown in the loss to Mexico in the semifinals before defeating the hosts in the third place game.

In 2026 Klam transferred to Cal Poly for the Mustangs' inaugural season of NCAA Women's Flag Football. Cal Poly is one of the first 10 NCAA D1 schools to sponsor Flag Football as a Varsity NCAA D1 sport.

== Personal life ==
Klam has also worked as an actress, appearing in The Long Road Home miniseries, as well as a television show based on the Sage Alexander young adult novel series, and films such as Jack’s Apocalypse.
