= Madison Fulford =

American flag football player (born 1995)

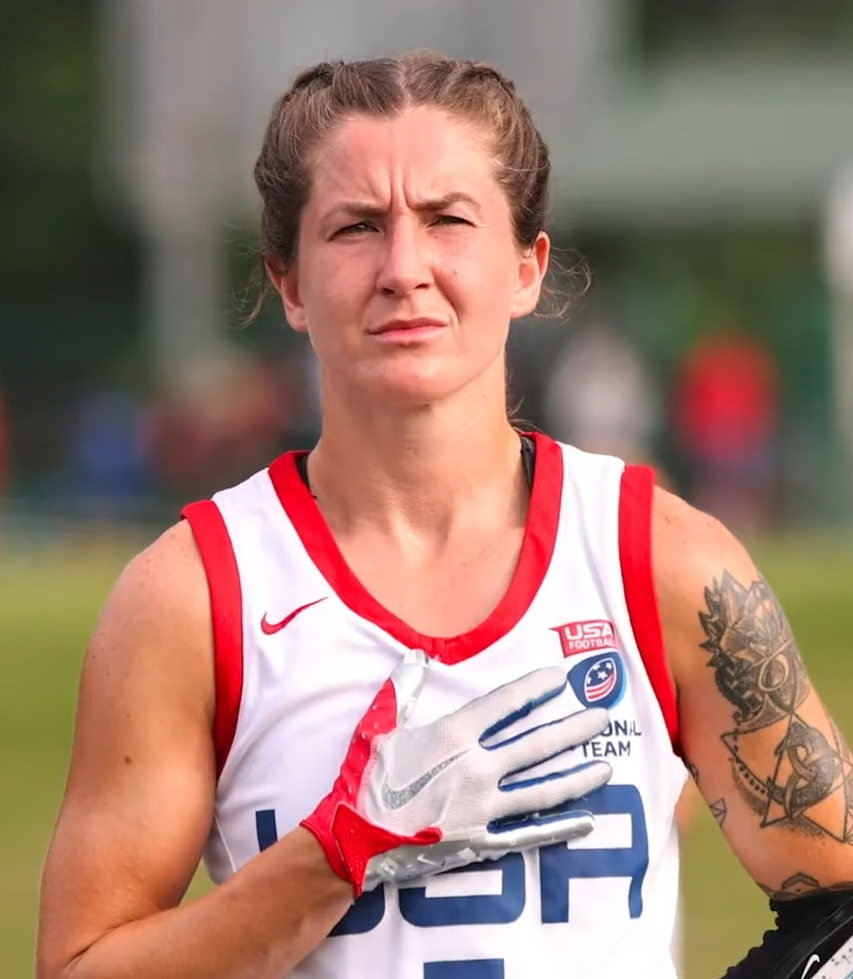
- Fulford in 2023

Personal information
- Born: 1995 (age 30–31)
- Home town: Concord, North Carolina, U.S.

Sport
- Country: United States
- Sport: Flag football
- Position: Wide receiver, defensive back, pass rusher
Medal record
Women's flag football
Representing United States
World Games
Silver medal – second place	2025 Chengdu	Team
IFAF World Championship
Gold medal – first place	2024 Lahti	Team
IFAF Americas Continental Championship
Gold medal – first place	2023 Charlotte	Team
Bronze medal – third place	2025 Penonomé	Team

Madison Fulford (born 1995) is an American international flag football player. She has represented the United States national team since 2023, winning the 2024 IFAF Women's Flag Football World Championship. She previously competed in track and field for the Limestone Saints.

== Early life ==
Fulford grew up in Concord, North Carolina, outside of Charlotte, and attended Jay M. Robinson High School. She was a fan of the Carolina Panthers and star receiver Steve Smith Sr. She attended Limestone University in Gaffney, South Carolina, and competed for their NCAA Division II track and field team, winning Conference Carolinas championships in the javelin, high jump, and 400 meters. She then enlisted in the United States Air Force as a mental health counselor.

== Flag football career ==
Fulford began playing flag football while stationed at Langley Air Force Base in Virginia in January 2022. Within a year and a half, she made the United States national team as a versatile player capable of playing wide receiver, defensive back, and pass rusher. She made her international debut at the 2023 IFAF Americas Continental Flag Football Championship in Charlotte, finishing the tournament with 33 catches for 578 yards and 14 touchdowns. She caught all four touchdowns for the United States in the 26–21 win over Mexico in the final.

Fulford was the leading receiver for the US with 48 catches for 709 yards and 20 touchdowns at the 2024 IFAF Women's Flag Football World Championship in Finland. She had a touchdown in the 31–18 win over Mexico in the final. Later in the year, she and Laneah Bryan joined the Caudillas de Chihuahua in Mexico and helped the team reach the championship game in the inaugural Torneo Nacional de Flag Femenil.

Fulford again led the US in receiving yards and matched Isabella Geraci with 10 touchdowns at the 2025 World Games in China. She had one touchdown in the 26–21 loss to Mexico in the final, earning a silver medal. Another loss to Mexico consigned the US to bronze at the 2025 IFAF Americas Continental Flag Football Championship in Panama, with one touchdown for Fulford in the third place game.
