= Isabella Geraci =

American flag football player (born 2000)

Personal information
- Nickname: Izzy
- Born: September 19, 2000 (age 26) North Ridgeville, Ohio, U.S.
- Height: 5 ft 7 in (170 cm)

Sport
- Country: United States
- Sport: Flag football
- Position: Wide receiver
Medal record
Women's flag football
Representing United States
World Games
| Silver medal – second place | 2025 Chengdu | Team |
IFAF World Championship
| Gold medal – first place | 2024 Lahti | Team |
IFAF Americas Continental Championship
| Bronze medal – third place | 2025 Penonomé | Team |

Isabella Geraci (born September 19, 2000) is an American international flag football player. She has represented the United States national team since 2024, winning the 2024 IFAF Women's Flag Football World Championship in her debut. She previously played college basketball for the Cleveland State Vikings and the USC Upstate Spartans.

== Early life ==
Geraci was born and raised in North Ridgeville, Ohio. She began playing flag football when she was seven, joining the boys' tackle football team in middle school. She was a fan of the Ohio State Buckeyes and star receiver Ted Ginn Jr. However, she gave up football in high school to pursue a sport that she could play in college, ranging into basketball, softball, golf, sprinting, long jump, and high jump. She was named the Lorain County Student-Athlete of the Year in 2018 after placing fourth in high jump at the state championships and averaging 17.1 points, 8.2 rebounds, 3.8 steals, and 2.4 assists per game as a basketball guard at North Ridgeville High School. Though she favored football to basketball, she became the top hardcourt scorer in school history.

== College basketball career ==
She accepted a scholarship to play college basketball for the Cleveland State Vikings. She had to adjust to a role on the bench as her lack of shooting limited her playing time. In four seasons at Cleveland State, she averaged 2.5 points, 1.9 rebounds, 0.8 steals, and 0.6 assists per game. She was part of the team that won the 2021 Women's Basketball Invitational as a junior and reached the 2022 final as a senior.

After graduating with a degree in marketing, she transferred to the USC Upstate Spartans for a fifth and final season, using an extra year of eligibility granted due to the COVID-19 pandemic. She started every game in the 2022–23 season and averaged 10.0 points, 6.7 rebounds (team high), 1.8 steals (team high), and 1.3 assists per game, scoring a career-high 23 points in a loss to Winthrop. She also made the track and field team at Upstate and placed second in high jump at the Sun Belt Conference championships.

== Flag football career ==
Geraci explored ways to play football after college and reached out to Madison Fulford, who soon invited her to join her flag football club team in Charlotte, North Carolina. After less than a year back in the sport, she successfully tried out for the United States national team in March 2024. She then made the 12-player roster for the 2024 IFAF Women's Flag Football World Championship in Finland. In the championship game in August, she caught 6 passes for 45 yards and a touchdown in the 31–18 win against Mexico. She finished the tournament with 39 catches for 464 yards (second on the team) and five touchdowns.

Geraci matched Fulford to lead the US with 10 touchdowns at the 2025 World Games in China, earning a silver medal after the 26–21 loss to Mexico in the final. Another loss to Mexico consigned the US to bronze at the 2025 IFAF Americas Continental Flag Football Championship in Panama, with three touchdowns for Geraci in the third place game.

== Personal life ==
Geraci is the daughter of Scott and Tamara Geraci and has a brother. In 2025, she worked at her family's jewelry store in Avon, Ohio.
