= Marissa Solis =

Mexican-born marketing executive

- Born: 1972 (age 53–54); Mexico City, Mexico
- Education: Georgetown University; University of Texas at Austin
- Occupation: Marketing executive
- Employer: National Football League
- Title: Senior vice president of global brand and consumer marketing

Marissa Solis (born 1972) is a Mexican-born marketing executive who has served as senior vice president of global brand and consumer marketing for the National Football League (NFL) since 2021. She previously held senior position at PepsiCo Beverages North America and Frito-Lay.

== Early life and education ==
Solis was born in 1972 in Mexico City, Mexico. At age ten, she moved to the Rio Grande Valley in Texas with her mother and sister. She attended Georgetown University on a scholarship and earned a bachelor's degree in international economics. She later received a master's degree in public administration and public affairs from the University of Texas at Austin.

== Career ==
Solis began her career as a brand manager for Procter & Gamble in Latin America. She was later a management consultant at Deloitte Consulting.

She joined PepsiCo in 2003 as an assistant brand manager for Tostitos. Over the next 18 years, she worked in brand marketing, sales, portfolio strategy, partnerships and media. She later served as vice president and general manager of PepsiCo Beverages North America's Hispanic Business Unit and senior vice president of core brands, partnerships and media at Frito-Lay North America.

The NFL appointed Solis senior vice president of global brand and consumer marketing in November 2021. Her responsibilities include developing the league's brand strategy and advertising campaigns. Her work has also included the "Helmets Off" strategy, which focuses on players' lives and interests away from the field. The NFL also promoted flag football through the 2023 Super Bowl commercial Run With It, which featured Mexico national-team quarterback Diana Flores.

Solis was an executive producer for Run With It, which won the 2023 Sports Emmy Award for Outstanding Public Service Content. She was also an EP for Somebody, which won the same category at the 2025 Sports Emmy Awards. In 2026, Adweek named her to its "Most Powerful Women in Sports" list, and People en Español included her in its annual list of the 25 most powerful women.
