= Jay M. Robinson High School =

American public school in North Carolina

Location
- 300 Pitts School Road SW; Concord, North Carolina 28027; United States; 35°21′45″N 80°39′42″W

Information
- School type: Public
- Established: 2001 (25 years ago)
- School district: Cabarrus County Schools
- CEEB code: 340890
- Principal: Erin Milam
- Teaching staff: 60.74 (FTE)
- Enrollment: 1,176 (2023-2024)
- Student to teacher ratio: 19.36
- Colors: Maroon, black, white
- Nickname: Bulldogs
- Rivals: Cox Mill High School
- Website: jmrhs.cabarrus.k12.nc.us

Jay M. Robinson High School, often referred to as Robinson, JMR, or JRob by students, is a comprehensive public high school located in Concord, North Carolina. It is the fifth high school of the Cabarrus County Schools system, opening its doors in August 2001, the county's first new high school since 1966. The school's enrollment dropped with the openings of Cox Mill High School and Hickory Ridge High School.

The school was constructed under the name Southwest Cabarrus High School, but was renamed in 2001 after the death of Jay Robinson, Chairman of the North Carolina State Board of Education and former Cabarrus County Schools administrator.

== Campus and Facilities ==
Robinson sits in the southwest sector of Cabarrus County, one mile (1.6 km) northeast of Charlotte Motor Speedway. Designed by Yates-Chreitzberg-Hughes Architects, the single-floor school is constructed around two central courtyards that can only be accessed from the interior of the school. At over 270,000 square feet (25,000 m^{2}), it is the largest school building in the county and one of the largest public buildings in the county. Robinson is locally characteristic for its distinctive architecture, 20-foot (6 m) wide hallways, and massive commons areas near the front of the school.

David S. Wright Auditorium, named for Robinson's first principal, hosts numerous functions throughout the year including concerts by high school and college groups and assemblies for community groups such as Elevation Church. Due to its large size, the school system often uses it for meetings for large numbers of staff members.

Athletic facilities located on the campus include Bulldog Stadium (football, soccer, and athletics) and a fieldhouse, a gymnasium (basketball, volleyball, wrestling) and adjoining practice gymnasium, tennis courts, and a baseball/softball complex.

== Academics ==
Jay M. Robinson High School campus from the southeast

Robinson offers classes in all subjects required under the North Carolina Department of Public Instruction (DPI). Advanced Placement courses are offered in U.S. History, World History, European History, American Government and Politics, Calculus AB and BC, Statistics, Biology, Chemistry, Environmental Science, Physics, Psychology, Music Theory, Studio Art, Spanish, English Language and Composition, and English Literature. Many online classes for college credit are provided by Rowan-Cabarrus Community College. In 2006 Robinson added an on-campus AFJROTC program. The school hosts broadcasting classes, with a 6-minute show airing each day. The marching band, named "The Pride of Robinson", won over 30 awards in 2006.

Robinson was recognized by the North Carolina Department of Public Instruction as a "School of Distinction" under the state's ABC standards for public education for the 2005–06 school year.

Its high school newspaper is the Paw Print, which is a member of the High School National Ad Network.

== Athletics ==
Robinson's athletic teams are known as the "Bulldogs". The school is a member of the 2A division of the North Carolina High School Athletic Association and competes in the Yadkin Valley Conference with several other high schools in Union, Stanly, and Cabarrus Counties. The school sponsors interscholastic football, cross country (boys and girls), volleyball, basketball (boys and girls), wrestling, swimming (boys and girls), soccer (boys and girls), tennis (boys and girls), track and field (boys and girls), golf, baseball, and softball.

From 2005 to 2009 and 2012 to 2015, Robinson competed in the 4A classification of the NCHSAA, in the MeCKa Conference. Currently, the school is in the South Piedmont Conference, with other schools in Cabarrus County.

In the 2009–2010 season Robinson won a state championship in wrestling for both the dual team tournament and the individual tournament, for Robinson's first-ever team state championships.

The 2015–2016 varsity boys basketball team earned both the South Piedmont Conference regular-season championship and the conference tournament. The Bulldogs won the NCHSAA 3A State Championship on March 12, 2016, at Carmichael Arena against the defending champion Terry Sanford 59–55.

On November 4, 2016, the varsity football team defeated Concord High School to claim the South Piedmont Conference Championship, finishing 8–1 in the conference and 9–2 overall.

On October 27, 2017, the varsity football team defeated Kannapolis to become back-to-back South Piedmont Conference Champions, finishing 5–0 in the conference and 9–2 overall.

== Principals ==
- David Wright (2001–2003)
- Jane Rollins (2003–2005)
- Todd Smith (2005–2008)
- Beverly Mack (2008–2011)
- Gregory Hall (2011–2017)
- Tripp Aldredge (2017–2018)
- Dennis Hobbs (2018–2023)
- Erin Milam (2023–present)

== Notable alumni ==
- David Ragan (2003), NASCAR driver
- Chrissy Wallace (2006), NASCAR driver
- R.J. Mattes (2008), former NFL offensive lineman
- Brody Koerner (2011), MLB pitcher
- Spencer Boyd, (2013, transfered) NASCAR driver
- Madison Fulford (2013), United States National Team flag football player
- Seth Johnson (2016), MLB pitcher
