= Coronado High School (Nevada) =

Public high school in Nevada, U.S.

Coordinates: 35.9935°N 115.1115°W

- 1001 Coronado Center Drive; Henderson, NV 89074

Information
- School type: Public High School
- Motto: Excellence by Design
- Established: 2001
- School district: Clark County School District
- Dean: Sarah Barlow; Robert Kalinowski
- Principal: Michael Piccininni
- Teaching staff: 124.00 (FTE)
- Grades: 9-12
- Enrollment: 3,147 (2024-2025)
- Student to teacher ratio: 25.38
- Colours: Red, white, and blue
- Athletics conference: Sunrise 4A Region
- Team name: Coronado Cougars
- Publication: The Roar
- Website: Coronado High School

Coronado High School is a public high school in Henderson, Nevada, part of Clark County School District. As of 2025, U.S. News rated it the 13th best high school in Nevada.

== History ==
The school was named after Francisco Vásquez de Coronado, a Spanish conquistador. It opened in 2000, with Monte Bay as its first principal. In 2005 Bay was selected as Nevada's Principal of the Year by the National Association of Secondary School Principals.

== Extracurricular activities ==
=== Clubs ===
There are more than fifty activities that a student can participate in at Coronado. Among them are Spanish and French clubs, Key Club, NHS, and AP Club.

=== Varsity Quiz ===
Coronado's Varsity Quiz team has been a state playoff team each year since 2004, and they won their first State Championship in 2008. The same year, they became the first team in Nevada to compete in the National Academic Quiz Tournaments' High School Championships. The team also won the State Championship in 2016.

=== Robotics ===
The Coronado Computer/Robotics Club once participated in the annual FIRST Robotics Competition. They received a participation grant from NASA for their "Rockin Robots" project in 2009/10.

In the mid-2010s, the Coronado Robotics Club switched to VEX Robotics. In 2020, when VEX Worlds was cancelled because of the pandemic, team 7870E for Coronado won the replacement "Virtual Worlds", a live-streamed, point-simulated tournament bracket.

=== Theatre ===
The Coronado Theatre Department puts on two mainstage productions per year: a fall play and a spring musical. Other annual productions include a musical theatre revue for charity, a student-directed short play festival, theatre awards night and occasionally, a summer musical. Notable productions include Into the Woods (2006), Disney's Beauty and the Beast (2013), the state-adjudicated production of Legally Blonde the Musical (2019), Les Misèrables (2020), and the state-adjudicated production of Mamma Mia! (2023). The theatre department also takes a biennial trip to New York City.

=== Choir ===
Coronado's choir has performed in cities such as Anaheim, Chicago, Honolulu, and Flagstaff. They performed in Carnegie Hall in New York City in the spring of 2016. The department features six official groups, including madrigals, Bella Voce, glee club,cconcert choir, and a men's and women's barbershop.

=== Band ===
Coronado High School marching band in the St. Patrick's Day parade in Dublin in 2015.

The band made finals at the 2006 Bands of America performance at Northern Arizona University as well as the 2009 Bands of America performance at St. George, Utah, at the time only the fourth school to do so in the history of Clark County School District. The band has traveled to San Diego, California, and London, England to march in the New Year's Day Parade, to Washington D.C. to perform in the National Cherry Blossom Festival and Independence Day Parade, and to Dublin, Ireland, for the St. Patrick's Day parade, and to Cleveland to perform at the Rock and Roll Hall of Fame.

== Athletics ==
=== Lacrosse ===
The boys lacrosse team won the State Championship in 2005. The girls team won the state championship in 2006, 2007, and 2019.

=== Bowling ===
The boys team won the Nevada Interscholastic Activities Association state championship in 2004, 2005, 2010, 2015 and 2026. while the girls team won 2006, 2007, 2008 and 2025.

=== Volleyball ===
Coronado High School's boys volleyball program has made ten state tournament appearances between 2004 and 2017, including four regional championships (2008, 2009, 2011, 2013), three state runners up (2009, 2010, 2011), and back-to-back state championships in 2012 and 2013.

Coronado High School's girls volleyball program has made six state tournament appearances between 2003 and 2017, including six regional titles (2003, 2005, 2013, 2014, 2015, 2017), one state runner up finish (2003), and a state championship "three-peat" with three state championship titles in 2013, 2014, and 2015.

=== Tennis ===
The women's team won the Nevada 4A State Title in 2003, 2017, and 2018.

=== Baseball ===
The 2013 boys' varsity baseball team won the state championship by defeating Bishop Gorman.

=== Baskeball ===
The 2025-26 boys' varsity basketball team won the Division 5A Nevada state championship for the first time in franchise history.

== Academics ==
Coronado offers 26 different Advanced Placement courses in English language arts, mathematics, art, science, and foreign language.

== Feeder schools ==
- Neil C. Twitchell Elementary School (2001)
- John C. Vanderburg Elementary School (1997)
- Glen C. Taylor Elementary School (2003)
- Elise L. Wolff Elementary School (2001)
- Frank Lamping Elementary School (1998)
- David M. Cox Elementary School (1990)
- Selma F. Bartlett Elementary School (1992)
- Bob Miller Middle School (1999)
- Del E. Webb Middle School (2005)
- Barbara & Hank Greenspun Junior High School (1991)

== Notable alumni ==
- Taylor Flint (2016), soccer, USWNT, Racing Louisville FC
- Frankie Collins (2021), basketball player for the Vanderbilt Commodores
- Jaden Hardy (2021), basketball player for the Washington Wizards
- Jaxon Kohler (2022 - transferred), basketball player for the Michigan State Spartans
- Maci Joncich (2024), United States National Team flag football player
- JJ Buchanan (2025), wide receiver for the Michigan Wolverines
