= South Central High School (North Carolina) =

American public school in North Carolina

Location
- 570 W Forlines Road; Winterville, North Carolina 28590; United States; 35°32′28″N 77°25′42″W

Information
- School type: Public
- Established: 2002 (24 years ago)
- Status: Active
- School district: Pitt County Schools
- Superintendent: Steve Lassiter
- CEEB code: 344096
- Principal: Chena Cayton
- Teaching staff: 94.35 (FTE)
- Enrollment: 1,738 (2024-2025)
- Average class size: 25
- Student to teacher ratio: 18.42
- Schedule: Block schedule
- Hours in school day: 8
- Colors: Maroon, Platinum, and Black
- Athletics conference: Big Carolina 6A/7A
- Sports: Basketball, Football, Baseball, Softball, Soccer, Swimming, Golf, Tennis, Volleyball, Cross Country, Cheerleading, Track and Field, Wrestling
- Mascot: Falcon
- Rival: JH Rose High School; D.H. Conley High School
- Yearbook: The Talon
- Feeder schools: A.G. Cox Middle, Hope Middle, CM Eppes Middle, E.B. Aycock
- Website: schs.pitt.k12.nc.us

South Central High School is a public high school in Winterville, North Carolina. It is the sixth high school in Pitt County's school system.

== History ==
The school opened in 2002, to ease the student load of J.H. Rose and D.H. Conley. The entire project cost approximately $28 million. The school first Principal was Mr. Art Rouse and Assistant Principal was Mrs. Singleton. The rival high schools D.H. Conley and J.H. Rose and the feeder middle schools A.G. Cox and CM Eppes helped with the naming of the school. Many subdivisions in Greenville and Winterville fall in the districts for South Central High School, including: Westhaven, Cedar Ridge, Irish Creek, Starhill Farms, Signature Place, Ashley Meadows, Augusta Trails, Barefoot Landing, Barrington Fields, Baywood, Brook Hollow, Brighton Place and Canterbury.

== Academics ==
South Central offers many classes that other schools do not, such as Japanese, Adobe, Digital Photography and African American History.

== Athletics and other extracurricular activities ==
South Central has a strong 7A athletic department, and are rivals with D.H. Conley and J.H. Rose. The sports department includes: Junior Varsity and Varsity teams of men's and women's basketball, soccer, tennis, swimming, cross country, track and field in addition to volleyball, wrestling, baseball, softball and cheerleading. South Central acquired a mascot during the 2011–2012 school year known as "Flash the Falcon."

The Performing Arts department consists of classes such as band, orchestra, dance, and theater. The band program is a Superior ranked band at the Musical Performance Assessment at Havelock High School. The dance studio puts on performances every fall and spring. The theater classes perform skits and larger scale dramas throughout the course of the school year.

== Notable alumni ==
- Amber Clark-Robinson (2011), United States National Team flag football player
