= Morris LaGrand =

American football player (born 1953)

No. 39, 45
- Position: Running back

Personal information
- Born: February 9, 1953 (age 73); Tampa, Florida, U.S.
- Listed height: 6 ft 1 in (1.85 m)
- Listed weight: 220 lb (100 kg)

Career information
- High school: Robinson (Tampa)
- College: Tampa
- NFL draft: 1975: 6th round, 137th overall pick

Career history
- Kansas City Chiefs (1975); New Orleans Saints (1975)

Career NFL statistics
- Rushing attempts: 13
- Rushing yards: 38
- Rushing TDs: 1
- Stats at Pro Football Reference

Morris LaGrand (born February 9, 1953) is an American former professional football player who was a running back in the National Football League (NFL). He played college football for the Tampa Spartans. LaGrand played in the NFL for the Kansas City Chiefs and New Orleans Saints in 1975.
