= Kickboxing at the 2025 World Games – Men's K1 style 75 kg =

Men's K1 style 75 kg at the 2025 World Games
- Venue: Sichuan Provincial Gymnasium
- Location: Chengdu, China
- Dates: 12–14 August 2025
- Competitors: 8 from 8 nations

Medalists
gold medal	Osaid Jodah	Israel
silver medal	Dimitar Stoyanov	Bulgaria
bronze medal	Anthony Schleicher	United States

The men's K1 style 75 kg competition in kickboxing at the 2025 World Games took place from 12 to 14 August 2025 at the Sichuan Provincial Gymnasium in Chengdu, China.

== Competition format ==
A total of 8 athletes entered the competition. They fought in the cup system.

== Results ==
Quarterfinals
Dimitar Stoyanov (BUL)	3
Davlatbek Rayimjonov (UZB)	0
Matías García (ARG)	0
Dominik Cinal (POL)	3
Zoltán Nardelotti (HUN)	1
Anthony Schleicher (USA)	2
Marouane Ed-Dyouri (MAR)	0
Osaid Jodah (ISR)	3

Semifinals
Dimitar Stoyanov (BUL)	2
Dominik Cinal (POL)	1
Anthony Schleicher (USA)	0
Osaid Jodah (ISR)	3

Final
Dimitar Stoyanov (BUL)	0
Osaid Jodah (ISR)	3

Third place
Dominik Cinal (POL)
Anthony Schleicher (USA)	KO
