= Thomas Richard Robinson High School =

Coordinates: 27.873898°N 82.515006°W

Thomas R. Robinson High School

Location
- 6311 S. Lois Avenue; Tampa, Florida 33616; United States

Information
- Type: Public
- Motto: Pride Through Excellence
- Established: 1959
- School district: Hillsborough County Public Schools
- Principal: David Brown
- Staff: 54.08 (on an FTE basis)
- Grades: 9–12
- Enrollment: 1,438 (2024–2025)
- Student to teacher ratio: 26.59
- Colors: Black, White and Gray
- Team name: Knights
- Rivals: Plant
- Website: www.hillsboroughschools.org/o/robinsonhs

Thomas R. Robinson High School, known as Robinson High School, is a public Hillsborough County high school in Tampa, Florida, United States. It is one of the five high schools in the county that offers the International Baccalaureate diploma program. The school was established in 1959 and is named after Thomas Richard Robinson, an educator in Hillsborough County who began teaching in 1917. Robinson High School is the smallest high school in Hillsborough County. The official mascot of Robinson is the Fighting Knight.

This is the zoned high school for on-post housing for MacDill Air Force Base.

== Athletics ==
Robinson High School offers sports including football, flag-football, baseball, basketball, volleyball, tennis, golf, cross country, soccer, lacrosse, and track. The flag-football team have been state champions 11 times (2014, 2016, 2017, 2018, 2019, 2021, 2022, 2023, 2024, 2025, and 2026). The school's rival is Plant High School.

== International Baccalaureate Programme ==
The school is the third Hillsborough County high school to have an International Baccalaureate Programme, with the other IB schools being C. Leon King High School, Strawberry Crest High School, and Hillsborough High School (Tampa, Florida). The program was established in the 2006–2007 school year and offers a Pre-IB curriculum for grades 9 and 10, and an IB Diploma Programme for grades 11 and 12. Robinson received the status of a full-fledged IB diploma school for the 2008–2009 school year. The first class of IB students graduated in 2010.

Only 150 spots are open every year for Robinson High's IB program. Robinson High School had the highest number of National Merit semi finalists in Hillsborough County in 2015.

== Notable alumni ==
- Delbert Alvarado - NFL player
- Javier Arenas - NFL player
- Deliah Autry-Jones - flag football player
- Charlie Bradley - basketball player
- Janet Cruz - Florida State Senator
- Greg Ellingson - NFL player
- Mike Graham - professional wrestler
- Bruce Hector - NFL player
- Hulk Hogan - professional wrestler and actor
- Austin Idol - professional wrestler
- Steve Keirn - professional wrestler
- Morris LaGrand - NFL player
- Joep Lange - HIV/AIDS researcher
- Cam Lockridge - college football cornerback
- Byron Pringle - NFL player
- John Reaves - NFL player
- Dirty Dick Slater - professional wrestler
- Larry Smith - NFL player
- Matt Vogler - football player
- Frankie Williams - NFL player
