= Franklin High School (El Paso, Texas) =

Public school in Texas, United States

Location
- 900 N. Resler Drive; El Paso, Texas 79912; United States; 31.8611°N 106.5564°W

Information
- Type: Public
- Established: 1993
- School district: El Paso Independent School District
- Principal: Amanda Bowser
- Staff: 161.63 (FTE)
- Grades: 9-12
- Enrollment: 2,909 (2020–22)
- Student to teacher ratio: 17.36
- Campus: Urban
- Colors: Black, purple, and silver
- Mascot: Cougar
- Website: www.episd.org/o/fhs

Franklin High School is a public high school located on the west side of El Paso, Texas, which is part of the El Paso Independent School District. It opened in 1993. Its name refers to the nearby Franklin Mountains. Although the student population of the school is usually between 2,000 and 3,000 annually, as of the 2023-24 school year, it exceeds 3,100. Since 2022, the principal has been Amanda Bowser.

== Feeder schools ==
Franklin's middle school feeder schools include: Brown Middle School, Haskins PK-8, and Hornedo Middle School. Franklin's elementary school feeder schools include: Polk, Lundy, Tippin, Kohlberg, Haskins PK-8, Rosa Guerrero, and Herrera Elementary.

== Academics ==
Since 2016, Franklin offers a magnet STEAM/New Tech program with emphasis on preparing students for nursing programs, music production, and engineering. The school partners with Texas Tech's Health Sciences Center El Paso and El Paso Community College.

== Extracurricular activities ==
=== High Q ===
The Franklin High Q team has enjoyed national success in recent years, taking three consecutive second-place trophies at the Ysleta High School Invitationals, losing only to in-city rivals and Coronado High School. The team has also reached the bracket championship on KCOS' televised tournament .

=== Band ===
The Franklin High School Band includes:

- Marching Band
- Color Guard
- 3 Concert Bands
- 2 Jazz Bands
- Winter Guard
- Baton Twirlers

All of Franklin's ensembles consistently receive 1st Division ratings at EPISD, UIL Area Contests, and other festivals locally, statewide and nationwide. Each year, a large number of students participate in All Region Band, advance to the Area level, and make the Texas All State Band. The "Star of the West" band hosts the district's Solo and Ensemble each year.

The Franklin Band has a nationally recognized drumline that was awarded second place at P.A.S.I.C. in Austin, Texas, in the Stand-still division in 2006.

The Franklin Drum Line has won the Coronado-Hosted Drumline competition, "Thunder Drums", numerous times, including 2008. The Ensemble got first place, Best Overall, and Best Front Ensemble.

The Franklin Band has achieved many awards including:

- N.M.S.U. Tournament Of Bands Finalist - 8 times
- S.I.S.D. MarchFest Finalist 2012
- UTEP Day Of Percussion Champions 1997, 1998
- Thunderdrums Percussion Festival first place 2006, 2008, 2010
- U.I.L. Region Marching Contest 12 years First Division

=== Newspaper ===
The Chronicle is Franklin High School's student newspaper. It has won numerous local and national awards. On March 20, 2009, The Chronicle was presented with a Silver Crown award at Columbia University in New York. In 2012, The Chronicle also earned a second Silver Crown.

=== Yearbook ===
Pride is the Franklin yearbook. It has been recognized as one of the best yearbooks in the nation by the National Scholastic Press Association and the Columbia Scholastic Press Association.

For the 2013 20-year anniversary yearbook, themed Icon, Pride earned both a CSPA Gold Crown and a Pacemaker, a feat accomplished by only five yearbooks in the entire nation.

Pride was named a Pacemaker Finalist in 2008, 2009, 2010 and 2011. Pride was awarded a CSPA Silver Crown award for the 2009 and 2010 yearbooks. In 2011, Pride, for the first time, earned a CSPA Gold Crown award and received it again in 2013. In addition to these national awards, Pride also received the ILPC (Interscholatic League Press Conference) Gold Star Award and the ILPC Award of Distinguished Merit. ILPC is particular to the state of Texas.

Pride 2014, themed RADICAL, earned a CSPA Silver Crown and a NSPA Pacemaker nomination.

Pride 2015, themed HUMAN, was one of 13 high schools nationally to be awarded a Columbia Scholastic Press Associations's Gold Crown.

=== Air Force JROTC ===
Franklin High School is home to TX-9410, a unit formed jointly with nearby Coronado High School. Consisting of one cadet squadron, the unit is reputable for its award-winning drill teams, high unit assessments, and the success of its graduates outside of high school. The program has had two cadets move into the U.S. military academies.

== Notable alumni ==
- Blake Allen, composer and violist
- Laneah Bryan, flag football player
- Jenny Chiu, soccer player and journalist
- Greg Jerman, professional football player
- Fernando Rodriguez - Major League Baseball relief pitcher
- Baylor Romney - former college football quarterback for the BYU Cougars
- Bryan Safi - comedian and co-host of the podcast Throwing Shade and the TV Land late-night show of the same name.
