= Greg Jerman =

American football player (born 1979)

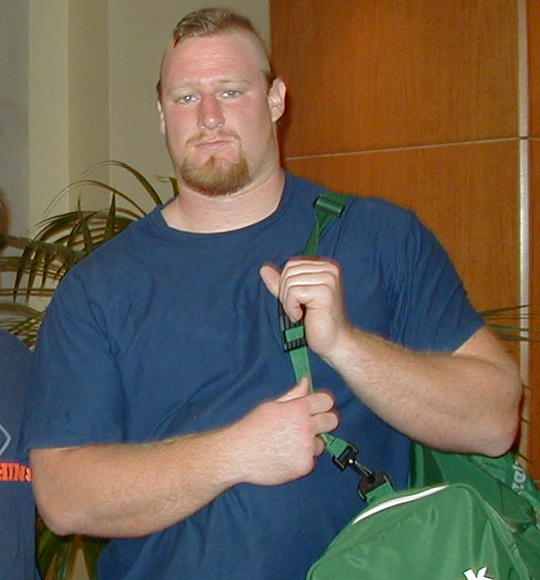
- Jerman with the Dolphins in 2002

Profile
- Position: Offensive tackle

Personal information
- Born: January 24, 1979 (age 47); Hyannis, Massachusetts, U.S.
- Listed height: 6 ft 5 in (1.96 m)
- Listed weight: 310 lb (141 kg)

Career information
- College: Baylor
- NFL draft: 2002: undrafted

Career history
- Miami Dolphins (2002–2004); Buffalo Bills (2005)

Awards and highlights
- Second-team All-Big 12 (2001)
- Stats at Pro Football Reference

Gregory Stephen Jerman (born January 24, 1979) is an American former professional football player who was an offensive tackle for four seasons in the National Football League (NFL) with the Miami Dolphins from 2002 to 2004 and for the Buffalo Bills in 2005. He played college football for the Baylor Bears from 1998 to 2001. He was born in 1979 at Hyannis, Massachusetts, and attended Franklin High School in El Paso, Texas. He was admitted to the Texas State Bar in 2014 and began practicing law with the Lubbock County Criminal District Attorney's office.
