= R.J. Mattes =

American football player (born 1990)

R. J. Mattes
No. 66
- Position: Offensive lineman

Personal information
- Born: April 29, 1990 (age 36); Redmond, Washington, U.S.
- Listed height: 6 ft 7 in (2.01 m)
- Listed weight: 315 lb (143 kg)

Career information
- High school: Jay M. Robinson (Concord, North Carolina)
- College: NC State
- NFL draft: 2013: undrafted

Career history
- New England Patriots (2013–2014)*; Tampa Bay Buccaneers (2014)*; Boston Brawlers (2014)
- * Offseason or practice squad member only
- Stats at Pro Football Reference

R. J. Mattes (born April 29, 1990) is an American former football offensive lineman that played for the New England Patriots and Tampa Bay Bucs. He played college football at North Carolina State. He also saw time with the Boston brawlers with the fxfl.

== Professional career ==
=== New England Patriots ===
On May 13, 2013, Mattes signed with the New England Patriots as an undrafted free agent. On May 23, he was released by the Patriots. On June 3, 2013, he was re-signed by the team. On August 19, 2013, he was released by the Patriots for the second time. On August 20, 2013, he cleared waivers and was placed on the Patriots' injured reserve list. On August 24, 2013, he was waived from injured reserve with an injury settlement. Mattes was signed by the New England Patriots as a free agent on December 30, 2013 He was waived on October 11, 2014.

=== Tampa Bay Buccaneers ===
Mattes signed with the Tampa Bay Buccaneers on August 21, 2014. The Buccaneers waived Mattes on August 24.
