= Vanita Krouch =

American flag football player (born 1980)

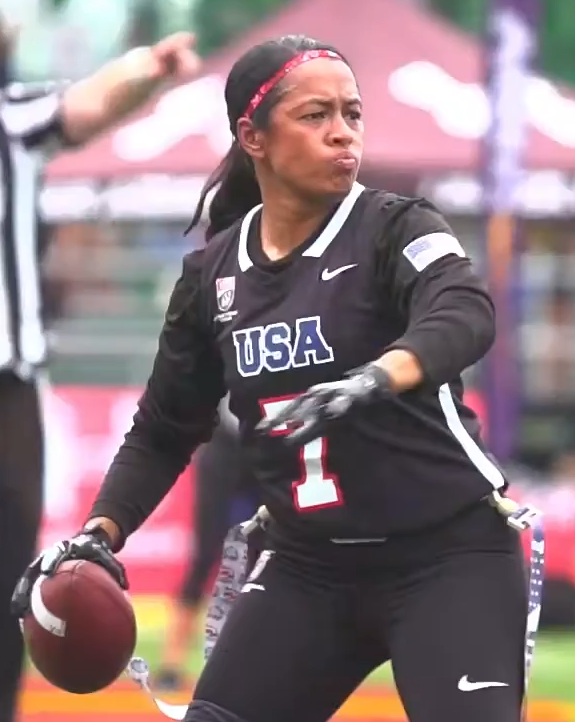
- Krouch in 2023

Personal information
- Born: 1980 (age 45–46) Philippines

Sport
- Country: United States
- Sport: Flag football
- Position: Quarterback
Medal record
Women's flag football
Representing United States
World Games
Silver medal – second place	2022 Birmingham	Team
Silver medal – second place	2025 Chengdu	Team
IFAF World Championship
Gold medal – first place	2018 Panama City	Team
Gold medal – first place	2021 Jerusalem	Team
Gold medal – first place	2024 Lahti	Team
IFAF Americas Continental Championship
Gold medal – first place	2023 Charlotte	Team
Bronze medal – third place	2025 Penonomé	Team

Vanita Krouch (born September 1980) is an American international flag football quarterback. She has represented the United States national team since 2016, winning three IFAF Flag Football World Championships and two World Games silver medals.

== Early life ==
She was born in a refugee camp in the Philippines after her mother, Phonnary Krouch, and three older brothers had fled the regime of the Khmer Rouge in Cambodia. When she was two months old the family moved to the United States.

She grew up in Texas and played basketball for four seasons at Southern Methodist University for the SMU Mustangs, graduating in 2003. She didn’t start playing flag football until after her collegiate career had ended.

== Career ==
After graduating SMU in 2003, Krouch continued to play basketball in semi-pro and adult leagues. She started playing flag football in 2006 after looking for local Dallas-area activities.

She became the quarterback for the United States women's national flag football team, making her debut in 2016. With the US national team she won gold at the 2018 and 2021 IFAF Flag Football World Championship as well as the 2023 IFAF Americas Championships. She also led the team to the silver medal at the 2022 World Games. In Finland in 2024, she led the American team to a third consecutive title at the 2024 IFAF Women's Flag Football World Championship.

She was the offensive coordinator for the NFC at the NFL Pro Bowl flag football game in 2023, alongside Eli Manning as NFC head coach and DeMarcus Ware as NFC defensive coordinator.

== Personal life ==
As of 2024, she lives in Carrollton, Texas and teaches PE at La Villita Elementary School. She has helped raise funds for the Texas flag football team Austin Fury, founded by the parents of her US national teammate Ashlea Klam. She wears the number 4 jersey and has her own clothing line, 4Ward Apparel.
