= Flag football at the 2025 World Games =

- Venue: Chengdu No. 7 High School Eastern Campus Athletics Field
- Dates: 14–17 August 2025
- No. of events: 1
- Competitors: 8 teams from 8 nations

The flag football competition at the 2025 World Games took place from 14 to 17 August 2025, in Chengdu in China, at the Chengdu No. 7 High School Eastern Campus Athletics Field. The competition only included the women's tournament.

== Qualification ==
A total of eight teams qualified for the event: Originally, Spain was set to compete, but were unable to attend. The next-placed team at the 2024 IFAF Women's Flag Football World Championship, Italy, was invited.

Event	Location	Dates	Total places	Qualified NOCs
Women's – 8 teams
Host nation	—N/a	—N/a	1	China
2024 IFAF Women's Flag Football; World Championship	(Finland) Lahti	27–30 August 2024	7	United States; Mexico; Japan; Austria; ~~Spain~~; Canada; Great Britain; Italy

== Participating nations ==
- Austria
- Canada
- China
- Great Britain
- Japan
- Italy
- Mexico
- United States

== Medal table ==
* Host nation (China)

Rank	Nation	Gold	Silver	Bronze	Total
1	Mexico	1	0	0	1
2	United States	0	1	0	1
3	Canada	0	0	1	1
Totals (3 entries)		1	1	1	3

== Medalists ==
Event	Gold	Silver	Bronze
Women's tournament	Mexico: Victoria Chávez; Silvia Contreras; Monica Rangel; Andrea Fernández; Ana Aguayo; Elizabeth Bourde; Andrea Martínez; Zara Galán; Allison Salazar; Tania Rincón; Diana Flores; Angela Funes	United States: Brianna Hernandez-Silva; Ashley Edwards; London Jenkins; Vanita Krouch; Madison Fulford; Maci Joncich; Amber Clark-Robinson; Deliah Autry; Addison Orsborn; Isabella Geraci; Laneah Bryan; Ashlea Klam	Canada: Clara Beaudoin; Rosalie Landry; Lauriane Beauchamp; Emma Racine; Sara Parker; Sabrina Gervais; Caroline Moquin-Joubert; Lea Duval; Alexane Fournier; Catherine Gaumont; Laurence Caron; Laura Molimard

Source: TWG 2025

== Draw ==
The draw which has been conducted by January 2025 followed a serpentine format, with teams placed according to their standings from the 2024 IFAF Women's Flag Football World Championship. Spain had not withdrawn by the time the draw occurred.

Group A
Team
United States (1)
Austria (4)
Canada (5)
China (NR)

Group B
Team
Mexico (2)
Japan (3)
Spain* (6)
Great Britain (7)

- (*) Later replaced by Italy (8) after the draw

== Results ==
=== Preliminary round ===
==== Group A ====
Pos	Team	Pld	W	L	PF	PA	PD	Qualification	United States	Canada	Austria	People's Republic of China
1	United States	3	3	0	126	77	+49	Quarterfinals	—	39–31	48–34	39–12
2	Canada	3	2	1	113	76	+37	Quarterfinals	31–39	—	34–25	48–12
3	Austria	3	1	2	106	127	−21	Quarterfinals	34–48	25–34	—	47–45
4	China (H)	3	0	3	69	134	−65	Quarterfinals	12–39	12–48	45–47	—

Source: TWG 2025
(H) Hosts

==== Group B ====
Pos	Team	Pld	W	L	PF	PA	PD	Qualification	Mexico	United Kingdom	Japan	Italy
1	Mexico	3	3	0	121	44	+77	Quarterfinals	—	34–13	41–24	46–7
2	Great Britain	3	2	1	65	71	−6	Quarterfinals	13–34	—	26–24	26–13
3	Japan	3	1	2	81	73	+8	Quarterfinals	24–41	24–26	—	33–6
4	Italy	3	0	3	26	105	−79	Quarterfinals	7–46	13–26	6–33	—

Source: TWG 2025

=== Final round ===
==== Bracket ====
Placement (Fifth place)
17 August
Great Britain	34
China	13
Placement (Seventh place)
17 August
Italy	0
Japan	33

Consolation (5th–8th)
16 August
Italy	28
Great Britain	35
16 August
China	28
Japan	22

Quarterfinals
16 August
United States	33
Italy	12
16 August
Austria	40
Great Britain	28
16 August
China	0
Mexico	40
16 August
Canada	32
Japan	27

Semifinals
16 August
United States	46
Austria	39
16 August
Mexico	25
Canada	13

Final
17 August
United States	21
Mexico	26
Bronze medal game
17 August
Austria	20
Canada	38

==== Quarterfinals ====
Quarterfinal 1

Quarter	1	2	Total
United States	27	6	33
Italy	0	12	12

at Chengdu No. 7 High School Eastern Campus Athletics Field

- Date: 16 August 2025
- Game time: 08:30
- Referee: R: Jed Brookes-Lewis (GBR) DJ: Magdalena Szymko (POL) FJ: Xing Tianyu (CHN) SJ: Wei Di (CHN)
- Report: TWG 2025
Quarterfinal 2

Quarter	1	2	Total
Canada	6	26	32
Japan	20	7	27

at Chengdu No. 7 High School Eastern Campus Athletics Field

- Date: 16 August 2025
- Game time: 09:50
- Referee: R: Desiree Abrams (USA) DJ: Nathan Cope (AUS) FJ: Giane Pessoa (BRA) SJ: Zhang Qipeng (CHN)
- Report: TWG 2025
Quarterfinal 3

Quarter	1	2	Total
Great Britain	14	14	28
Austria	27	13	40

at Chengdu No. 7 High School Eastern Campus Athletics Field

- Date: 16 August 2025
- Game time: 11:10
- Referee: R: Daniel Barrera Madsen (DEN) DJ: Mara Steiner (GER) FJ: Riccardo Zampedri (ITA) SJ: Zhuang HengLi (CHN)
- Report: TWG 2025
Quarterfinal 4

Quarter	1	2	Total
Mexico	20	20	40
China	0	0	0

at Chengdu No. 7 High School Eastern Campus Athletics Field

- Date: 16 August 2025
- Game time: 12:30
- Referee: R: Desiree Abrams (USA) DJ: Nathan Cope (AUS) FJ: Giane Pessoa (BRA) SJ: Jed Brookes-Lewis (GBR)
- Report: TWG 2025

==== Consolation matches ====
Consolation match 1

Quarter	1	2	OT	Total
Italy	21	7	0	28
Great Britain	14	14	7	35

at Chengdu No. 7 High School Eastern Campus Athletics Field

- Date: 16 August 2025
- Game time: 17:40
- Referee: R: Desiree Abrams (USA) DJ: Nathan Cope (AUS) FJ: Giane Pessoa (BRA) SJ: Zhang Qipeng (CHN)
- Report
Consolation match 2

Quarter	1	2	Total
China	13	15	28
Japan	14	8	22

at Chengdu No. 7 High School Eastern Campus Athletics Field

- Date: 16 August 2025
- Game time: 18:50
- Referee: R: Jed Brookes-Lewis (GBR) DJ: Magdalena Szymko (POL) FJ: Riccardo Zampedri (ITA) SJ: Mara Steiner (GER)
- Report

==== Semifinals ====
Semifinal 1

Quarter	1	2	Total
United States	20	26	46
Austria	25	14	39

at Chengdu No. 7 High School Eastern Campus Athletics Field

- Date: 16 August 2025
- Game time: 15:00
- Referee: R: Daniel Barrera Madsen (DEN) DJ: Mara Steiner (GER) FJ: Riccardo Zampedri (ITA) SJ: Zhuang HengLi (CHN)
- Report: Report
Semifinal 2

Quarter	1	2	Total
Mexico	13	12	25
Canada	7	6	13

at Chengdu No. 7 High School Eastern Campus Athletics Field

- Date: 16 August 2025
- Game time: 16:20
- Referee: R: Jed Brookes-Lewis (GBR) DJ: Magdalena Szymko (POL) FJ: Xing Tianyu (CHN) SJ: Wei Di (CHN)
- Report

==== Placement matches ====
Seventh place match

Quarter	1	2	Total
Italy	0	0	0
Japan	20	13	33

at Chengdu No. 7 High School Eastern Campus Athletics Field

- Date: 17 August 2025
- Game time: 09:00
- Referee: R: Wei Di (CHN) DJ: Xing Tianyu (CHN) FJ: Zhang Qipeng (CHN) SJ: Zhuang HengLi (CHN)
- Report
Fifth place match

Quarter	1	2	Total
Great Britain	19	15	34
China	7	6	13

at Chengdu No. 7 High School Eastern Campus Athletics Field

- Date: 17 August 2025
- Game time: 10:10
- Referee: R: Daniel Barrera Madsen (DEN) DJ: Magdalena Szymko (POL) FJ: Giane Pessoa (BRA) SJ: Mara Steiner (GER)
- Report

==== Bronze medal match ====
Bronze medal match

Quarter	1	2	Total
Austria	20	0	20
Canada	19	19	38

at Chengdu No. 7 High School Eastern Campus Athletics Field

- Date: 17 August 2025
- Game time: 11:30
- Referee: R: Desiree Abrams (USA) DJ: Nathan Cope (AUS) FJ: Wei Di (CHN) SJ: Mara Steiner (GER)
- Report

==== Gold medal match ====
Final

Quarter	1	2	Total
United States	7	14	21
Mexico	14	12	26

at Chengdu No. 7 High School Eastern Campus Athletics Field

- Date: 17 August 2025
- Game time: 12:50
- Referee: R: Daniel Barrera Madsen (DEN) DJ: Jed Brookes-Lewis (GBR) FJ: Riccardo Zampedri (ITA) SJ: Xing Tianyu (CHN)
- Report
