= Bruce Hector =

American football player (born 1994)

Profile
- Position: Defensive tackle

Personal information
- Born: October 7, 1994 (age 32); Tampa, Florida, U.S.
- Listed height: 6 ft 2 in (1.88 m)
- Listed weight: 296 lb (134 kg)

Career information
- High school: Robinson (Tampa)
- College: South Florida (2013–2017)
- NFL draft: 2018: undrafted

Career history
- Philadelphia Eagles (2018); Arizona Cardinals (2019)*; Philadelphia Eagles (2019); Carolina Panthers (2020); Tennessee Titans (2021)*; Detroit Lions (2021–2022); Arlington Renegades (2023); New York Jets (2023)*; Houston Texans (2023)*; New York Jets (2023)*; Houston Texans (2023)*; New York Jets (2023–2024); San Francisco 49ers (2025)*
- * Offseason or practice squad member only

Awards and highlights
- XFL champion (2023); Second-team All-AAC (2017)

Career NFL statistics as of 2023
- Total tackles: 12
- Sacks: 0.5
- Stats at Pro Football Reference

Bruce Hector (born October 7, 1994) is an American professional football defensive tackle. He played college football for the South Florida Bulls and signed with the Philadelphia Eagles as an undrafted free agent in 2018.

== Early life ==
Hector was born and grew up in Tampa, Florida. He initially attended Gulf High School for two years before transferring to Thomas Richard Robinson High School where he played both offensive and defensive line for the Knights. As a senior, Hector made 55 tackles (9.5 for a loss) and was named first-team Class 5A all-state.

== College career ==
Over the course of his career at South Florida, Hector recorded 90 total tackles (60 solo), 28 tackles for loss and 18 sacks (5th in school history). As a senior, Hector made 38 tackles, 13 for loss, seven sacks with a forced fumble and one pass defensed and was named second-team All-AAC. Following the end of his senior season, Hector was invited to play in the NFLPA Collegiate Bowl.

== Professional career ==
Pre-draft measurables
Height	Weight	Arm length	Hand span	40-yard dash	10-yard split	20-yard split	20-yard shuttle	Three-cone drill	Vertical jump	Broad jump	Bench press
6 ft 2 1/4 in (1.89 m)	299 lb (136 kg)	32 7/8 in (0.84 m)	10 1/4 in (0.26 m)	4.98 s	1.75 s	2.83 s	4.69 s	7.85 s	33.5 in (0.85 m)	9 ft 0 in (2.74 m)	26 reps
All values from Pro Day

=== Philadelphia Eagles (first stint) ===
Hector signed with the Philadelphia Eagles as an undrafted free agent in May 2018. He made his NFL debut on September 6, 2018, in the season opener against the Atlanta Falcons. He was waived by the Eagles on October 2, 2018, and subsequently signed to their practice squad two days later. He was promoted to the active roster on October 19, 2018. Hector recorded his first career tackle, a combined sack of Cam Newton along with Brandon Graham, on October 21, 2018, in a 21–17 loss to the Carolina Panthers. Hector was waived by the Eagles again on October 30, 2018, and re-signed to the practice squad on November 2. He was promoted back to the active roster on December 8, 2018. In his rookie season Hector played in eight games, recording two tackles and a half of a sack.

=== Arizona Cardinals ===
On August 22, 2019, Hector was traded to the Arizona Cardinals in exchange for safety Rudy Ford. Hector was waived during final roster cuts on August 31.

=== Philadelphia Eagles (second stint) ===
Hector was re-signed to the Eagles' practice squad on September 1, 2019. He was promoted to the active roster on October 25. Hector was waived on October 28, and re-signed to the practice squad the next day. He was promoted to the active roster on December 18. Hector was waived on August 7, 2020.

=== Carolina Panthers ===
Hector was claimed off waivers by the Carolina Panthers on August 9, 2020. He was waived on September 5, and signed to the practice squad the next day. He was elevated to the active roster on November 7 and November 14 for the team's weeks 9 and 10 games against the Kansas City Chiefs and Tampa Bay Buccaneers, and reverted to the practice squad after each game. He was placed on the practice squad/COVID-19 list by the team on December 4, and restored to the practice squad on December 15. His practice squad contract with the team expired after the season on January 11, 2021.

=== Tennessee Titans ===
Hector signed with the Tennessee Titans on April 23, 2021. He was waived by Tennessee on July 26.

=== Detroit Lions ===
On July 27, 2021, Hector was claimed off waivers by the Detroit Lions. He was waived on August 31, and re-signed to the practice squad the next day. He signed a reserve/future contract with the Lions on January 10, 2022.

On August 30, 2022, Hector was waived by the Lions and signed to the practice squad the next day. He was released on October 25.

=== Arlington Renegades ===
Hector was selected by the Arlington Renegades in the 2023 XFL draft. He was released from his contract on August 7, 2023.

=== New York Jets (first stint) ===
On August 8, 2023, Hector signed with the New York Jets. He was released by New York on August 29.

=== Houston Texans ===
On September 13, 2023, Hector was signed to the Houston Texans practice squad. He was released on September 27.

=== New York Jets (second stint) ===
On November 1, 2023, Hector was signed to the Jets practice squad. He was released on November 7.

=== Houston Texans (second stint) ===
On November 23, 2023, Hector was signed to the practice squad. He was released on November 30.

=== New York Jets (third stint) ===
On December 4, 2023, Hector was signed to the Jets practice squad. He was promoted to the active roster on January 6, 2024.

On August 27, 2024, Hector was released by the Jets and re-signed to the practice squad. He was promoted to the active roster on November 8.

=== San Francisco 49ers ===
On August 4, 2025, Hector signed with the San Francisco 49ers. He was released on August 26 as part of final roster cuts. On October 8, Hector signed with the 49ers' practice squad and was released six days later.
