= Flag football at the 2025 Central American Games =

- Venue: Estadio Emilio Royo
- Location: Panama City, Panama
- Dates: 24 – 26 October 2025

The flag football competition at the 2025 Central American Games took place from 24 to 26 October 2025, at the Estadio Emilio Royo in Panama City, Panama. (Note: While Guatemala served as the official host of the Games, Panama hosted the flag football and esports competitions while Honduras hosted the sambo and wrestling events.)

Flag football made its debut on the Central American Games programme and featured five men's teams and five women's teams. Panama won the gold medals in both the men's and women's tournaments.

== Background ==
On 10 May 2025, flag football was announced as one of four additions to the Central American Games programme, along with esports, sambo, and wrestling. This was in the context of the sport's growing popularity in the region, especially ahead of its debut at the 2028 Summer Olympics.

The competition, which featured five men's teams and five women's teams, was jointly organized by the Central American Sports Organization (ORDECA), the governing body of the Central American Games, and the International Federation of American Football (IFAF), the international governing body for American football (including its non-contact variant, flag football). 12 officials (seven male, five female) from the five participating nations, plus Argentina and Chile, were assigned to the competition.

IFAF Americas continental director Javier L’Episcopo stated: "This is a great opportunity for teams from the Central American region to showcase their talents on a prominent stage. Hosts Panama have already established themselves in the international game and having newcomers such as Nicaragua and Honduras compete shows the positive growth flag football is experiencing in this region." Additionally, IFAF managing director Andy Fuller said: "On behalf of IFAF, I would like to thank all the key stakeholders in supporting the inclusion of flag football. We are honoured to be present at the Games and look forward to a fabulous competition."

Panama entered the Games as the tournament favorites. Despite being played under IFAF rules, the competition had no bearing on Olympic qualification or IFAF world rankings.

=== Venue ===
All games were played at the Estadio Emilio Royo in Panama City, Panama.

Flag football at the 2025 Central American Games is located in Panama	Panama City
Flag football at the 2025 Central American Games is located in Panama	Estadio Emilio Royo
Flag football at the 2025 Central American Games is located in Panama	Capacity: 3,200

== Teams ==
=== Men's tournament ===
- El Salvador
- Guatemala
- Honduras
- Nicaragua
- Panama

=== Women's tournament ===
- El Salvador
- Guatemala
- Honduras
- Nicaragua
- Panama

== Medalists ==
Event	Gold	Silver	Bronze
Men's tournament	(Panama) Panama; César Aguilera; Dennis Allen; Jorge Ávila; Carlos de la Rosa; Juan Diego Julio; José Mexil; José Murillo; Félix Olivares; Hugo Prepville; Ricardo Quijano; Gaspar Ramos; Adrián Roux	(Guatemala) Guatemala; Rodrigo Abreu; Roberto Castañeda; Mario Flores; Carlos González; José Manuel Jiménez; Carlos Juárez; Luis Leonardo; Dennis Molineros; Sebastián González; Luis Rodríguez Morales; José Alejandro Ruiz; Zachary Tutt	(El Salvador) El Salvador; Renan Emmanuel Cárcamo Mejía; Jorge Eduardo Duran Arana; Hugo Alejandro Durán Flores; Bryan Enrique Fuentes Gómez; Rodrigo Edgardo Hércules Jaén; Francisco Antonio Martínez Menjivar; Lucas Alexander Melendez Perez; Fernando José Moreno Huezo; Rafael Eduardo Novoa Garcia; Fernando Andrés Rincand Landaverde; Luis Andrés Silva Flores; Herberth Rodrigo Vanegas Barberena
Women's tournament	(Panama) Panama; Maria Baloy; Shanira Brown; Angeline Bunting; Orlanda Castro; Ana Paula de León; Leslie del Cid; Tatiana dos Santos; Denise Guerra; Karla Holder; Carolina Ojo; Marian Torrero; Ana Vincensini	(Guatemala) Guatemala; Ximena Arenales; Ximena Barillas; Alejandra Castañeda; Gabriela Castañeda; Tania Castillo; Andrea Díez; Sarah Garrido; Jimena Guay; Denise Henry; Mariana Portillo; Andrea Quevedo; Andrea Yonker	(El Salvador) El Salvador; Adriana Nicole Arriaza Velasquez; Karla Guadalupe Candelas Artiga; Pamela Antonieta Cienfuegos Durán; Adriana Astrid Cordon Hernández; Lilian Aracely de León de Arévalo; Andrea Marcela García López; Stefany Abigail González Calderón; Gabriela Tatiana Lemus Abrego; Gabriela Alejandra Martínez de Moreno; Andrea Stefany Rodríguez Alfaro; Rebeca Pahola Rodríguez Pineda; Celeste María Ruiz Jaén

== Men's tournament ==
=== Group stage ===
Pos	Team	Pld	W	L	PF	PA	PD	Qualification	Panama	Guatemala	El Salvador	Nicaragua	Honduras
1	Panama (H)	4	4	0	220	32	+188	Semifinals	—	53–20	40–6	70–0	57–6
2	Guatemala	4	3	1	122	77	+45	Semifinals	20–53	—	26–6	35–6	41–12
3	El Salvador	4	2	2	45	78	−33	Semifinals	6–40	6–26	—	19–12	14–0
4	Nicaragua	4	1	3	49	144	−95		0–70	6–35	12–19	—	31–20
5	Honduras	4	0	4	38	143	−105		6–57	12–41	0–14	20–31	—

Updated to match(es) played on 26 October 2025. Source:
(H) Hosts

=== Knockout stage ===
Semifinals
Panama	52
Nicaragua	14
El Salvador	6
Guatemala	28

Finals
Panama	47
Guatemala	12
Third place
Nicaragua	18
El Salvador	38

=== Final standings ===
Panama defeated Guatemala in the gold medal game by a score of 47–12, with Adrián Roux throwing three touchdown passes; El Salvador defeated Nicaragua, 38–18, for the bronze medal.

Rank	Team
1st place, gold medalist(s)	Panama
2nd place, silver medalist(s)	Guatemala
3rd place, bronze medalist(s)	El Salvador
4	Nicaragua
5	Honduras

== Women's tournament ==
=== Group stage ===
Pos	Team	Pld	W	L	PF	PA	PD	Qualification	Panama	Guatemala	El Salvador	Honduras	Nicaragua
1	Panama (H)	4	4	0	255	7	+248	Semifinals	—	38–7	77–0	74–0	66–0
2	Guatemala	4	3	1	82	57	+25	Semifinals	7–38	—	28–6	21–7	26–6
3	El Salvador	4	2	2	32	117	−85	Semifinals	0–77	6–28	—	19–6	7–6
4	Honduras	4	1	3	33	128	−95		0–74	7–21	6–19	—	20–14
5	Nicaragua	4	0	4	26	119	−93		0–66	6–26	6–7	14–20	—

Updated to match(es) played on 26 October 2025. Source:
(H) Hosts

=== Knockout stage ===
Semifinals
Panama	60
Honduras	0
El Salvador	6
Guatemala	50

Finals
Panama	34
Guatemala	0
Third place
El Salvador	18
Honduras	0

=== Final standings ===
Panama defeated Guatemala in the gold medal game by a score of 34–0, with Orlanda Castro throwing five touchdown passes; El Salvador defeated Honduras, 18–0, for the bronze medal.

Rank	Team
1st place, gold medalist(s)	Panama
2nd place, silver medalist(s)	Guatemala
3rd place, bronze medalist(s)	El Salvador
4	Honduras
5	Nicaragua
