= Panama women's national flag football team =

Panama

National team information
- Federation: American Football Federation of Panama
- IFAF continental area: Americas

Championships
- World championships: 1: 2016

The Panama women's national flag football team represents Panama in women's international flag football competitions. The team is governed by the American Football Federation of Panama. As of 2025, the International Federation of American Football (IFAF) rank the Panama women's team 12th worldwide.

The team has won two medals at the IFAF Flag Football World Championship – a gold medal in 2016 and a silver medal in 2018 – as well as a bronze medal at the 2022 World Games and a gold medal at the 2025 Central American Games.

== Competitive record ==
Champions Runners-up Third place Fourth place

=== IFAF World Championship ===
IFAF Flag Football World Championship
Year	Result	Pos	Pld	W	D	L	PF	PA	Ref.
(Austria) 2002	Did not participate								
(France) 2004	Did not participate								
(South Korea) 2006	Did not participate								
(Canada) 2008	Did not participate								
(Canada) 2010	Did not participate								
(Sweden) 2012	Twelfth place	12th	8	2	0	6	111	172	
(Italy) 2014	Seventh place	7th	9	4	0	5	137	187	
(United States) 2016	Champions	1st	8	7	0	1	229	107	
(Panama) 2018	Runners-up	2nd	8	7	0	1	316	92	
(Israel) 2021	Fifth place	5th	7	6	0	1	231	88	
(Finland) 2024	Tenth place	10th	5	2	0	3	146	103	
(Germany) 2026	Qualified								

=== World Games ===
World Games
Year	Result	Pos	Pld	W	D	L	PF	PA	Ref.
(United States) 2022	Third place	3rd	6	4	0	2	173	124	
(China) 2025	Did not participate								

=== IFAF Americas Continental Championship ===
IFAF Americas Continental Flag Football Championship
Year	Result	Pos	Pld	W	D	L	PF	PA	Ref.
(United States) 2023	Fourth place	4th	6	2	0	4	110	128	
(Panama) 2025	Fourth place	4th	5	3	0	2	190	117	

=== Central American Games ===
Central American Games
Year	Result	Pos	Pld	W	D	L	PF	PA	Ref.
(Panama) 2025	Champions	1st	6	6	0	0	349	7	

== IFAF World Championship ==
Panama made its debut at the IFAF Flag Football World Championship in 2012. The roster consisted of: Karina Arenas, Diana Bayard, Maricell Campbell, Kendra Chavarria, Luciley Díaz, Rejane Riquelme, Tracy Roberts, Katherine Russel, Verónica Salas, Joan Tenorio, Eucaris Valderrama, and Verónica Vega. After losing their first game against Austria, Panama defeated Sweden, 25–6, for their first World Championship victory. They went on to lose to Germany, Mexico, and Brazil to go 1–4 in pool play. In the round robin placement round, Panama beat Brazil and lost to both Denmark and Italy, finishing in 12th place.

In 2014, Panama went 3–3 in pool play. After losing to Canada in the quarterfinals, Panama competed in the placement round, where they lost to France before beating Italy to finish in seventh place.

In 2016, Panama won their first gold medal at the IFAF World Championship. After going 4–1 in pool play, they defeated Israel in the quarterfinals, Mexico in the semifinals, and Austria in the final. Ángela Evans was named the tournament MVP.

Panama hosted the 2018 edition at the Estadio Maracaná in Panama City. They went 5–0 in pool play, and then defeated Denmark in the quarterfinals and Mexico in the semifinals. Panama lost to the United States in the final in front of 2,000 hometown fans.

== World Games ==
=== 2022 ===
Flag football made its debut in the multi-disciplinary sports event World Games for the 2022 edition held in Birmingham, Alabama. The tournament was hosted at Birmingham's Legion Field and was held from July 10 to 14.

The Panama team comprised: Valerie Castillero, Andrea Castillo, Orlanda Castro, Leslie del Cid, Ángela Evans, Maria de Lourdes Gallimore, Arlen Hernández, Ana Paula de León, Ayin Rodríguez, María Rodríguez, Tatiana dos Santos, and Thaymiluz Santos.

Panama went 2–1 in pool play, beating France and Denmark and losing to the United States. They then defeated Italy in the quarterfinals before losing to Mexico in the semifinals. In the bronze medal game, Panama beat Austria, 40–19, with Orlanda Castro throwing four touchdown passes; it was Panama's only medal at the Games.

== Central American Games ==
=== 2025 ===
Flag football made its debut at the regional Central American Games in 2025. The tournament was hosted at the Estadio Emilio Royo in Panama City. Panama won the gold medal after a dominant performance, outscoring their opponents 349 to 7. They went 4–0 in pool play before defeating Honduras 60–0 in the semifinals and Guatemala 34–0 in the gold medal game.
