= 2021 IFAF Women's Flag Football World Championship =

2021 IFAF Women's Flag Football World Championships

Tournament information
- Sport: Flag football
- Location: Jerusalem
- Dates: 6 December–8 December
- Host: Israel
- Teams: 18

Final positions
- Champions: United States (2nd title)
- Runner-up: Mexico
- 3rd place: Austria

The 2021 IFAF Women's Flag Football World Championships was the 10th World Championships in women's flag football. The tournament took place in Jerusalem, Israel, from 6 to 8 December 2021. The top seven teams, not including the United States, qualified for the 2022 World Games.

== Venue ==
Denmark was scheduled to host the 2020 edition only for it to be canceled due to the coronavirus pandemic.

The International Federation of American Football (IFAF) selected Israel to host the Flag Football World Championships for 2021. The Kraft Family Sports Campus in Jerusalem was originally scheduled to stage the men's and women's events, but due to expected high winds the games were played at Teddy Stadium.

== Tournament groups ==
After the group ballot, 18 teams were divided into 2 groups of 5 a 2 groups of 4. In the group stage each team played each other once, while the second stage of the event included play-offs and placement matches.

The two best teams of group A and B went directly to the quarter-final.

Russia competed as Team Neutral due to sanctions imposed in compliance of the Court of Arbitration for Sport decision in the Russian Anti-Doping Agency case.

Group A	Group B	Group C	Group D
United States; Team Neutral; Spain; France; Finland	Panama; Czech Republic; Chile; Italy; Belarus	Austria; Switzerland; Mexico; Germany	Israel (hosts); Denmark; Brazil; Japan

== Results ==
=== Preliminary round ===
==== Group A ====
Pos	Team	Pld	W	D	L	PF	PA	PD	Qualification	United States	France	Spain		Finland
1	United States	4	4	0	0	185	25	+160	Quarterfinals	—	39–0	46–0	46–12	54–13
2	France	4	2	1	1	57	58	−1	Quarterfinals	0–39	—	12–12	25–7	20–0
3	Spain	4	2	1	1	95	92	+3	9th-12th place	0–46	12–12	—	26–21	57–13
4	Team Neutral	4	1	0	3	89	104	−15	13th-16th place	12–46	7–25	21–26	—	49–7
5	Finland	4	0	0	4	33	180	−147	17th-18th place	13–54	0–20	13–57	7–49	—

Source: Official website

==== Group B ====
Pos	Team	Pld	W	L	PF	PA	PD	Qualification	Panama	Italy	Czech Republic	Belarus	Chile
1	Panama	4	4	0	165	43	+122	Quarterfinals	—	43–14	34–7	36–7	52–15
2	Italy	4	3	1	94	97	−3	Quarterfinals	14–43	—	40–24	19–18	21–12
3	Czech Republic	4	2	2	112	99	+13	9th-12th place	7–34	24–40	—	42–25	39–0
4	Belarus	4	1	3	81	117	−36	13th-16th place	7–36	18–19	25–42	—	31–20
5	Chile	4	0	4	47	143	−96	17th–18th place	15–52	12–21	0–39	20–31	—

Source: Official website

==== Group C ====
Pos	Team	Pld	W	D	L	PF	PA	PD	Qualification	Mexico	Austria	Germany	Switzerland
1	Mexico	3	3	0	0	112	64	+48	Quarterfinals	—	25–20	33–20	54–24
2	Austria	3	1	1	1	104	69	+35	Quarterfinals	20–25	—	38–38	46–6
3	Germany	3	1	1	1	79	77	+2	9th-12th place	20–33	38–38	—	21–6
4	Switzerland	3	0	0	3	36	121	−85	13th-16th place	24–54	6–46	6–21	—

Source: Official website

==== Group D ====
Pos	Team	Pld	W	D	L	PF	PA	PD	Qualification	Brazil	Japan	Israel	Denmark
1	Brazil	3	2	1	0	81	53	+28	Quarterfinals	—	20–14	20–20	41–19
2	Japan	3	2	0	1	86	41	+45	Quarterfinals	14–20	—	40–0	32–21
3	Israel (H)	3	1	1	1	46	79	−33	9th-12th place	20–20	0–40	—	26–19
4	Denmark	3	0	0	3	59	99	−40	13th-16th place	19–41	21–32	19–26	—

Source: Official website
(H) Hosts

=== Knock-out stage ===
Quarter-finals
7 December
United States	40
Japan	24
7 December
Panama	19
Austria	20
7 December
France	6
Brazil	32
7 December
Italy	13
Mexico	46

Semi-finals
8 December
United States	33
Austria	6
8 December
Brazil	6
Mexico	47

Final
8 December
United States	31
Mexico	21
Bronze medal game
8 December
Austria	26
Brazil	13

=== Placement matches ===
==== 5th place bracket ====
5th–8th place semi-finals
7 December
Japan	34
Italy	28
7 December
Panama	15
France	0

5th place
7 December
Japan	25
Panama	32
7th place
7 December
Italy	26
France	31

==== 9th place bracket ====
9th-11th place semi-finals
7 December
Spain	27
Czech Republic	20
7 December
Germany	31
Israel	19

9th place
7 December
Spain	34
Germany	30
11th place
7 December
Czech Republic	25
Israel	24

==== 13th place bracket ====
13th-16th place semi-finals
7 December
Team Neutral	27
Belarus	6
7 December
Switzerland	20
Denmark	42

13th place
7 December
Team Neutral	32
Denmark	12
15th place
7 December
Belarus	12
Switzerland	13

==== 17th place bracket ====
17th place
8 December
Finland	32
Chile	0

== Final ranking ==
Rank	Team
Gold medal	United States
Silver medal	Mexico
Bronze medal	Austria
4	Brazil
5	Panama
6	Japan
7	France
8	Italy
9	Spain
10	Germany
11	Czech Republic
12	Israel
13	Team Neutral
14	Denmark
15	Switzerland
16	Belarus
17	Finland
18	Chile
