= Austria women's national flag football team =

Austria

National team information
- Federation: American Football Federation Austria
- IFAF continental area: Europe

Personnel
- Head coach: Robert Riedl (2024)

Championships
- European championships: 4: 2009, 2011, 2013, 2015

The Austria women's national flag football team represents Austria in women's international flag football matches. The sport is governed by the American Football Federation Austria (AFBÖ). In 2024, the International Federation of American Football (IFAF) ranked the Austrian women's team 4th worldwide. In 2025 they dropped to 6th.

Robert Riedl became head coach in January 2024 when he replaced Walter Demel.

== World championships ==
The Austrian women's team has received four medals at the IFAF Flag Football World Championship. They won silver in 2016 and bronze in 2010, 2014, and 2021.

Austria won the bronze medal game at the 2010 Championship where they defeated Mexico, the 2008 champions, with a score of 33–20. The team lost to France in 2012, taking fourth place. In 2014, they defeated Mexico to take the bronze medal. They took silver in 2016 against Panama with a score of 35–22. The team achieved bronze at the 2021 World Championship where they defeated Brazil 26-13. During the World Games in 2022, the team was defeated by Panama for the bronze medal. The team placed 4th at the 2024 World Championship losing to Japan 41–40. At the 2025 World Games the team lost against Canada for the bronze medal in the score of 38-20.

== European championships ==
IFAF Europe organizes flag football continental championships every two years to fall in between the world championships. The women's team has earned four gold medals and two bronze medals at the IFAF European Flag Football Championship. The team won four consecutive titles for the 2011, 2013, 2015, and 2017 games. They won bronze in 2007 against Sweden and in 2019 against Denmark. They won silver in 2025, losing to Great Britain 34-33 in overtime in the final in Paris.

== World Games ==
Austria placed 4th at the 2022 World Games, flag football's debut year. In 2025 they again placed 4th.
