= Canada women's national flag football team =

Women's national flag football team representing Canada

Canada

National team information
- Federation: Football Canada
- IFAF continental area: Americas

Championships
- World championships: 3: 2010, 2014, 2026

The Canada women's national flag football team represents Canada in women's international flag football matches. The sport is governed by Football Canada. In 2024, the International Federation of American Football (IFAF) ranked the Canadian women's team 6th worldwide. In 2025 they rose to 4th.

Francois Bougie was the team's first head coach. He served in 2008, 2010, 2014, 2016, 2020, and 2023. Rachel Lessard was named head coach in 2025.

== Championships ==
The Canadian women's team has received four medals at the IFAF Flag Football World Championship. They won gold in 2010 and 2014, silver in 2008, and bronze in 2018. At the 2008 game they lost to Mexico in the finals. In 2010, the team defeated the US 31-18 to win gold. They won gold in the 2014 World Championship with a winning score of 32-21 against the US. During the 2018 Championship in Panama City, the women took a bronze by defeating Mexico 19-14. In 2025 World Games the team took a bronze after defeating Austria in the score of 38-20.

IFAF Americas organizes flag football continental championships every two years to fall in between the world championships. The women's team won a bronze medal at the 2023 IFAF Americas Continental Flag Football Championship by defeating Panama. They won 20-16 in overtime.

== Roster ==
2024:

Coaches

- Patrick Jerome
- Jacques Void

Offense

- Émilie Carrier (receiver)
- Sarah Cormier (center)
- Caroline Moquin-Joubert (receiver)
- Sara Parker (quarterback)
- Laurence Pontbriand (wide receiver)
- Emma Racine (receiver)

Defense

- Erika Bastien (defensive back)
- Jessica Bositampen (rusher)
- Jasmine Farmer (defensive back)
- Catherine Gaumont (defensive back)
- Sabrina Gervais (defensive back)
- Tamara Journeau (defensive back)

== Competitive record ==
Champions Runners-up Third place Fourth place Tournament played fully or partially on home soil

=== Olympic Games ===
Olympic Games record
Year	Round	Position	Pld	W	L	PF	PA	Squad
(United States) 2028	Qualified							
Total								—
