= 2023 IFAF Americas Continental Women's Flag Football Championship =

- 2023

Tournament information
- Sport: Flag football
- Location: Charlotte, North Carolina
- Dates: 5 July–7 July
- Host: United States
- Venue: 1
- Teams: 6

Final positions
- Champions: United States (1st title)
- Runner-up: Mexico
- 3rd place: Canada

The 2023 International Federation of American Football (IFAF) Americas Continental Women's Flag Football Championship was held from July 5–7 at the United States Performance Center (USPC) located at the University of North Carolina at Charlotte, North Carolina (UNCC). The championship brings together the best women’s flag football national teams from North and South America.

It was the first Americas Continental Championship taking place this year as IFAF embarks on its biggest-ever cycle of global flag football competition in the run up to the 2024 IFAF Women's Flag Football World Championship in Lahti, Finland.

The Continental Championship served as a qualifying pathway for the first time, with the reinforced global competitions structure reflecting flag football’s momentum as one of the world’s fastest-growing sports.

== Results ==
=== Round Robin ===
Pos	Team	Pld	W	L	PF	PA	PD	United States	Mexico	Canada	Panama	Brazil	Chile
1	United States	5	5	0	201	35	+166	—	39–06	26–13	39–06	41–08	56–02
2	Mexico	5	4	1	175	84	+91	06–39	—	27–25	28–06	51–14	63–00
3	Canada	5	3	2	132	85	+47	13–26	25–27	—	33–20	21–00	40–12
4	Panama	5	2	3	96	107	−11	06–39	06–28		—	18–00	46–07
5	Brazil	5	1	4	62	131	−69	08–41	14–51	00–21	00–18	—	40–00
6	Chile	5	0	5	21	245	−224	02–56	00–63	12–40	07–46	00–40	—

Updated to match(es) played on 7th July 2023. Source: https://ifafamericaschampionship.com/game-center

=== Final Round ===
==== 5th Place Game ====
Date	Hour	Team 1	Score	Team 2
7 July	1:30 pm ET	Brazil	34- 06	Chile

==== Bronze Medal Game ====
Date	Hour	Team 1	Score	Team 2
7 July	3:00 pm ET	Canada	20 - 14	Panama

==== Gold Medal Game ====
Date	Hour	Team 1	Score	Team 2
7 July	6:00 pm ET	United States	26 - 21	Mexico

== Final ranking ==
1st place, gold medalist(s)	United States
2nd place, silver medalist(s)	Mexico
3rd place, bronze medalist(s)	Canada
4	Panama
5	Brazil
6	Chile

== See also ==
- IFAF Americas Continental Flag Football Championship
- 2023 IFAF Americas Continental Men's Flag Football Championship
- 2024 IFAF Women's Flag Football World Championship
