= United States women's national flag football team =

United States
Logo

National team information
- Federation: USA Football
- IFAF continental area: Americas

Championships
- IFAF World Championship: 9 Gold (2018, 2021, 2024); Silver (2010, 2012, 2014, 2026)
- IFAF Americas Continental Championship: 2 Gold (2023); Bronze (2025)

United States women's national flag football team
Medal record

World Championship
Gold medal – first place	2018 Panama City	Team
Gold medal – first place	2021 Jerusalem	Team
Gold medal – first place	2024 Lahti	Team
Silver medal – second place	2010 Ottawa	Team
Silver medal – second place	2012 Gothenburg	Team
Silver medal – second place	2014 Grosseto	Team
Silver medal – second place	2026 Düsseldorf	Team

World Games
Silver medal – second place	2022 Birmingham	Team
Silver medal – second place	2025 Chengdu	Team

Americas Continental Championship
Gold medal – first place	2023 Charlotte	Team
Bronze medal – third place	2025 Panama	Team

The United States women's national flag football team represents the United States in women's international flag football matches. The sport is governed by USA Football. In 2023, the International Federation of American Football (IFAF) ranked the United States women's team 1st worldwide. In 2025 they ranked 2nd.

The head coach is Saaid Mortazavi with Mary Kate Bula and Matthew Hernandez as assistant coaches.

In 2008, the women competed in the IFAF Flag Football World Championship where they finished fourth. They won silver in 2010, 2012, and 2014. They lost to Canada twice and Mexico once. In the 2018 finals they defeated Panama 27–12 to win gold. The team defeated Mexico in the finals of 2021 championship. At the 2023 IFAF Americas Continental Flag Football Championship both the women's and men's teams defeated Mexico to win gold. In 2024 the women's team won a third gold after beating Mexico in the World Championship. The women's team also gained three silvers in 2010, 2012, and 2014.

During the 2022 World Games, the team again went to the finals with Mexico. This time they won silver with a score of 39–6. Quarterback Vanita Krouch was invited to an NFL game to honor the country's success at the games and to promote flag football. The team repeated the success in 2025 World Games held in Chengdu.

== Competitive record ==
Champions Runners-up Third place Fourth place

=== Olympic Games ===
Olympic Games
Year	Result	Pos	Pld	W	D	L	PF	PA
(United States) 2028	Qualified as host							
Total	0 title	0/1						

=== IFAF World Championship ===
IFAF Flag Football World Championship
Year	Result	Pos	Pld	W	D	L	PF	PA
(Austria) 2002	Did not participate							
(France) 2004	Did not participate							
(South Korea) 2006	Did not participate							
(Canada) 2008	Fourth place	4th						
(Canada) 2010	Runners-up	2nd						
(Sweden) 2012	Runners-up	2nd						
(Italy) 2014	Runners-up	2nd						
(United States) 2016	Quarterfinal	5th						
(Panama) 2018	Champions	1st						
(Israel) 2021	Champions	1st	7	7	0	0	289	76
(Finland) 2024	Champions	1st	8	8	0	0	335	80
(Germany) 2026	Runners-up	2nd	6	5	0	1	180	127
Total	3 titles	9/12						

=== World Games ===
World Games
Year	Result	Pos	Pld	W	D	L	PF	PA
(United States) 2022	Runners-up	2nd	6	5	0	1	176	137
(China) 2025	Runners-up	2nd	6	5	0	1	226	154
Total	0 title	2/2	12	10	0	2	402	291

=== IFAF Americas Continental Championship ===
IFAF Americas Continental Flag Football Championship
Year	Result	Pos	Pld	W	D	L	PF	PA
(United States) 2023	Champions	1st						
(Panama) 2025	Third place	3rd	6	5	0	1	215	75
Total	1 title	2/2						

== Players ==
=== Current squad ===
(player and position as of 2026)

- Deliah Autry-Jones; DB/WR
- Laneah Bryan; DB/WR
- Nykeeta Christopher
- Kennedy Foster
- Madison Fulford; WR/DB
- Isabella Geraci; WR/DB
- Loryn Goodwin
- Akemi Higa
- Brooklin Hill
- Maci Joncich; WR/QB
- Ashlea Klam; C/DB
- Kendra Meredith

Alternates

- Amber Clark-Robinson; DB/WR
- Ashley Edwards; DB/WR
- Valentina Fanetti; QB
- O'Mariah Gordon; WR/LB
- Brianna Hernandez-Silva; DB/WR
- London Jenkins; WR/DB

=== Past squad ===
==== 2025 ====
(player and position as of 2025)

- Deliah Autry-Jones; DB/WR
- Laneah Bryan; DB/WR
- Amber Clark-Robinson; DB/WR
- Ashley Edwards; DB/WR
- Madison Fulford; WR/DB
- Isabella Geraci; WR/DB
- Brianna Hernandez-Silva; DB/WR
- London Jenkins; WR/DB
- Maci Joncich; WR/QB
- Ashlea Klam; C/DB
- Vanita Krouch; QB
- Addison Orsborn; RSH/WR

Alternates

- Ariel Blair; DB/WR
- Jacci Crowe; WR/DB
- Valentina Fanetti; QB
- Alexandra Harris; WR/DB
- Sarah Massucci; WR/DB
- Janae Scott; DB/WR
