= Mexico women's national flag football team =

Mexico

National team information
- Federation: Federación Mexicana de Fútbol Americano
- IFAF continental area: Americas

Championships
- World championships: 3: 2004, 2008, 2012
- Americas championships: 1: 2025

The Mexico women's national flag football team represents Mexico in women's international flag football matches. The sport is governed by the Mexican American Football Federation. In 2024, the International Federation of American Football (IFAF) ranked the Mexico women's team 2nd worldwide. In 2025 they ranked first.

The women competed in the 2004 IFAF Flag Football World Championship, taking gold against Finland. They won again in 2008, this time defeating Canada. They took gold again in 2012 after defeating United States. In 2016 the team won the bronze medal in Miami. In 2021, they took silver against the United States with a score of 31–21.

In the 2022 World Games, Mexico defeated the US for the gold medal by a score of 39–6. Quarterback Diana Flores, along with America's Vanita Krouch and Panama's Andrea Castillo, were invited to an NFL game to honor the country's success at the games and to promote flag football. Flores has been the face of international flag football, starring in a Super Bowl commercial, serving as offensive coordinator at the 2023 Pro Bowl Games, and earning the first flag football deal with Under Armour.

At the 2023 IFAF Americas Continental Championship, Mexico lost the United States in the final.

Mexico successfully defended their World Games gold medal in 2025 in Chengdu, China, defeating the United States in the final, 26–21.

Mexico earned the last Olympic quota available at the 2026 IFAF Women's Flag Football World Championship in Düsseldorf, Germany after winning their bronze medal match over Great Britain 20-19.

== Selection process ==
National team players are picked from state selections, which participate in a national tournament each November. From there, 120 players are pre-selected to compete for 12 spots on the final national team roster. An exception is the World Games roster, which is reduced to eight players.

== Competitive record ==
Champions Runners-up Third place Fourth place

=== IFAF World Championship ===
IFAF Flag Football World Championship
Year	Result	Pos	Pld	W	D	L	PF	PA
(Austria) 2002								
(France) 2004	Champions	1st						
(South Korea) 2006								
(Canada) 2008	Champions	1st						
(Canada) 2010	Fourth place	4th						
(Sweden) 2012	Champions	1st						
(Italy) 2014	Fourth place	4th						
(United States) 2016	Third place	3rd						
(Panama) 2018	Fourth place	4th						
(Israel) 2021	Runners-up	2nd	6	5	0	1		
(Finland) 2024	Runners-up	2nd	8	7	0	1		
(Germany) 2026	Third place	3rd	6	5	0	1		

=== World Games ===
World Games
Year	Result	Pos	Pld	W	D	L	PF	PA	Ref.
(United States) 2022	Champions	1st	6	6	0	0	241	38	
(China) 2025	Champions	1st	6	6	0	0	212	78	

=== IFAF Americas Continental Championship ===
IFAF Americas Continental Flag Football Championship
Year	Result	Pos	Pld	W	D	L	PF	PA	Ref.
(United States) 2023	Runners-up	2nd	6	4	0	2	196	110	
(Panama) 2025	Champions (Note: Due to the weather, the women's final was suspended and Mexico were named champions as they led 12–0.)	1st	5	4	0	1	157	51	

=== Olympics Games ===
Olympic Games
Year	Result	Pos	Pld	W	D	L	PF	PA
(United States) 2028								

== Roster ==
IFAF World Flagg 2026:

Women's National Flag Football
#	Name	Position
1	Kentya Yaritza Morales Ramos	Defensive back
2	Victoria Chávez López	Defensive back/Wide receiver
3	Silvia Yolanda Contreras Medina	Center/Wide receiver
4	Mónica Rangel Salazar	Wide receiver
11	Elizabeth Bourde Quintana	Blitzer
13	Andrea "Andy" Martínez Perdomo	Wide receiver
21	Ximena Cuate Romero	Quarteback/Wide receiver
23	Hilda Haniel Reza Martínez	Defensive back
27	Allison Yamile Salazar Cuadros	Defensive back
31	Tania Rincón Samperio	Quarteback
33	Diana Alejandra Flores Arenas	Quarteback
99	Ángela Funes Fresán	Defensive back

Head Coach:

- Fernando Alfaro Espinoza (Head coach)

Assistant Coach:

- Fernando Nahara Sosa (Assistant)
- Luis Fernando Gutiérrez Acosta (Defensive coordinator)
- Topacio Daniela Conde Ávila (Ofensive coordinator)
- Arianna Paola Lora Vargas (Defensive assistant)
- Pamela Michelle Reyes Wiseman (Ofensive assistant)

== See also ==
- Mexico men's national flag football team
