= 2025 IFAF Americas Continental Women's Flag Football Championship =

International flag football competition

- 2025

Tournament information
- Sport: Flag football
- Location: Penonomé
- Dates: 12 September–14 September
- Host: Panama
- Venue: 1
- Teams: 9

Final positions
- Champions: Mexico (1st title)
- Runner-up: Canada
- 3rd place: United States

The 2025 International Federation of American Football (IFAF) Americas Continental Women's Flag Football Championship was held from September 12–14 at the Estadio Virgilio Tejeira at Penonomé. The championship brings together the best women's flag football national teams from North and South America.

It was the second Americas Continental Championship taking place this year as IFAF embarks on its biggest-ever cycle of global flag football competition in the run up to the 2026 IFAF Women's Flag Football World Championship in Düsseldorf, Germany.

The Continental Championship served as a qualifying pathway for the first time, with the reinforced global competitions structure reflecting flag football's momentum as one of the world's fastest-growing sports.

== Results ==
=== Preliminary round ===
==== Group A ====
Pos	Team	Pld	W	L	PF	PA	PD	United States	Panama	Brazil	Colombia	Jamaica
1	United States	4	4	0	176	31	+145	—	34–06	47–13	46–12	49–00
2	Panama	4	3	1	148	65	+83	06–34	—	49–12	44–06	49–13
3	Brazil	3	1	2	74	109	−35	13–47	12–49	—	49–13	00–00
4	Colombia	4	1	3	70	139	−69	12–46	06–44	13–49	—	39–00
5	Jamaica	3	0	3	13	137	−124	00–49	13–49	00–00	00–39	—

Updated to match(es) played on 13th September 2025. Source: https://affpanama.org/calendario_ffcc/

==== Group B ====
Pos	Team	Pld	W	L	PF	PA	PD	Canada	Mexico	Guatemala	Argentina
1	Canada	3	3	0	122	38	+84	—	26–25	40–13	56–00
2	Mexico	3	2	1	119	38	+81	25–26	—	40–06	54–06
3	Guatemala	3	1	2	58	93	−35	13–40	06–40	—	39–13
4	Argentina	3	0	3	19	149	−130	00–56	06–54	13–39	—

Updated to match(es) played on 13th September 2025. Source: https://affpanama.org/calendario_ffcc/

=== Final Round ===
==== 7-9 Classification Games ====
Date	Hour	Team 1	Score	Team 2
14 September	8:00 am ET	Argentina	18 - 06	Jamaica
14 September	11:45 am ET	Colombia	26 - 06	Argentina

==== 5th Place Game ====
Date	Hour	Team 1	Score	Team 2
14 September	11:45 am ET	Brazil	49 - 06	Guatemala

==== Semifinals ====
Date	Hour	Team 1	Score	Team 2
14 September	9:15 am ET	United States	13 - 26	Mexico
14 September	9:15 am ET	Canada	26 - 24	Panama

==== Bronze Medal Game ====
Date	Hour	Team 1	Score	Team 2
14 September	11:45 am ET	United States	26 - 18	Panama

==== Gold Medal Game ====
Date	Hour	Team 1	Score	Team 2	Note
14 September	2:15 pm ET	Mexico	12 - 00	Canada	Due to the weather, the final was suspended and Mexico were named champions as they led 12–0.

== Final ranking ==
1st place, gold medalist(s)	Mexico
1st place, gold medalist(s)	Canada
3rd place, bronze medalist(s)	United States
4	Panama
5	Brazil
6	Guatemala
7	Colombia
8	Argentina
9	Jamaica

== See also ==
- IFAF Americas Continental Flag Football Championship
- 2025 IFAF Americas Continental Men's Flag Football Championship
- 2026 IFAF Women's Flag Football World Championship
