= 2024 IFAF Women's Flag Football World Championship =

2024 IFAF Women's Flag Football World Championships

Tournament information
- Sport: Flag football
- Location: Lahti
- Dates: 27 August–30 August
- Host: Finland
- Venue: 2
- Teams: 23

Final positions
- Champions: United States (3rd title)
- Runner-up: Mexico
- 3rd place: Japan

The 2024 IFAF Women's Flag Football World Championships was the 11th World Championships in women's flag football. The tournament took place in Lahti, Finland, from 27 to 30 August of 2024.

== Venues ==
The championships utilised 2 venues: the Pajulahti Sports Institute for all group matches, and the Lahti Sports Center for play-offs and placement matches.

== Tournament groups ==
After the group ballot, 23 teams were divided into three groups of 5 and two groups of 4. In the group stage each team played each other once, while the second stage of the event included play-offs and placement matches.

The top three nations from the five groups, along with the best fourth-place finisher, advanced to the round of 16.

Group A	Group B	Group C	Group D	Group E
United States; Australia; France; Sweden; Ireland	Mexico; Canada; Italy; Denmark; South Korea	Japan; Germany; Brazil; Finland; Poland	Great Britain; Panama; Czech Republic; Israel	Austria; Spain; New Zealand; Switzerland

== Results ==
=== Preliminary round ===
==== Group A ====
Pos	Team	Pld	W	L	PF	PA	PD	Qualification	United States	France	Australia	Sweden	Ireland
1	United States	4	4	0	184	24	+160	Round of 16	—	37–6	48–6	40–6	59–6
2	France	4	3	1	131	85	+46	Round of 16	6–37	—	33–18	39–6	53–24
3	Australia	4	2	2	103	119	−16	Round of 16	6–48	18–33	—	46–25	33–13
4	Sweden	4	1	3	64	146	−82		6–40	6–39	25–46	—	27–21
5	Ireland	4	0	4	64	172	−108		6–59	24–53	13–33	21–27	—

Updated to match(es) played on 28th August 2024. Source: https://app.sportapp.fi/series/2024/2/2024-flagwc-women

==== Group B ====
Pos	Team	Pld	W	L	PF	PA	PD	Qualification	Mexico	Canada	Italy	South Korea	Denmark
1	Mexico	4	4	0	198	40	+158	Round of 16	—	38–28	45–6	58–0	57–6
2	Canada	4	3	1	167	75	+92	Round of 16	28–38	—	34–25	50–12	55–0
3	Italy	4	2	2	76	97	−21	Round of 16	6–45	25–34	—	25–12	20–6
4	South Korea	4	1	3	51	152	−101		0–58	12–50	12–25	—	27–19
5	Denmark	4	0	4	31	159	−128		6–57	0–55	6–20	19–27	—

Updated to match(es) played on 28th August 2024. Source: https://app.sportapp.fi/series/2024/2/2024-flagwc-women

==== Group C ====
Pos	Team	Pld	W	L	PF	PA	PD	Qualification	Germany	Japan	Brazil	Finland	Poland
1	Germany	4	4	0	177	72	+105	Round of 16	—	31–28	36–18	54–12	56–14
2	Japan	4	3	1	142	77	+65	Round of 16	28–31	—	34–21	33–6	47–19
3	Brazil	4	2	2	119	91	+28	Round of 16	18–36	21–34	—	33–21	47–0
4	Finland	4	1	3	73	133	−60	Best 4th place	12–54	6–33	21–33	—	34–13
5	Poland	4	0	4	46	184	−138		14–56	19–47	0–47	13–34	—

Updated to match(es) played on 28th August 2024. Source: https://app.sportapp.fi/series/2024/2/2024-flagwc-women

==== Group D ====
Pos	Team	Pld	W	L	PF	PA	PD	Qualification	United Kingdom	Panama	Israel	Czech Republic
1	Great Britain	3	3	0	115	33	+82	Round of 16	—	28–27	41–0	46–6
2	Panama	3	2	1	116	40	+76	Round of 16	27–28	—	55–6	34–6
3	Israel	3	1	2	42	129	−87	Round of 16	0–41	6–55	—	36–33
4	Czech Republic	3	0	3	45	116	−71		6–46	6–34	33–36	—

Updated to match(es) played on 28th August 2024. Source: https://app.sportapp.fi/series/2024/2/2024-flagwc-women

==== Group E ====
Pos	Team	Pld	W	L	PF	PA	PD	Qualification	Austria	Spain	Switzerland	New Zealand
1	Austria	3	3	0	132	67	+65	Round of 16	—	29–28	48–26	55–13
2	Spain	3	2	1	102	72	+30	Round of 16	28–29	—	33–31	41–12
3	Switzerland	3	1	2	79	95	−16	Round of 16	26–48	31–33	—	22–14
4	New Zealand	3	0	3	39	118	−79		13–55	12–41	14–22	—

Updated to match(es) played on 28th August 2024. Source: https://app.sportapp.fi/series/2024/2/2024-flagwc-women

=== Championship round ===
Round of 16
United States	61
Finland	0
France	22
Spain	28
Austria	34
Brazil	32
Germany	16
Italy	19
Mexico	42
Israel	6
Canada	37
Panama	6
Great Britain	35
Switzerland	26
Japan	27
Australia	13

Quarter-finals
United States	18
Spain	14
Austria	29
Italy	26
Mexico	35
Canada	20
Great Britain	34
Japan	40

Semi-finals
United States	41
Austria	24
Mexico	40
Japan	31

Final
United States	31
Mexico	18
Third Place
Japan	41
Austria	40

== Final ranking ==
Rank	Team
1st place, gold medalist(s)	United States
2nd place, silver medalist(s)	Mexico
3rd place, bronze medalist(s)	Japan
4	Austria
5	Canada
6	Spain
7	Great Britain
8	Italy
9	Germany
10	Panama
11	France
12	Switzerland
13	Brazil
14	Israel
15	Finland
16	Australia
17	Czech Republic
18	Sweden
19	New Zealand
20	South Korea
21	Ireland
22	Denmark
23	Poland

== See also ==
- 2024 IFAF Men's Flag Football World Championship
