= IFAF Americas Continental Flag Football Championship =

Continental championship in flag football

- Sport: Flag football
- Founded: 2023
- Organising body: IFAF Americas
- Countries: IFAF Americas member associations
- Continent: Americas
- Most recent champions: United States and Mexico (men; co-champions); Mexico (women)
- Most titles: United States (men; 2 titles); United States and Mexico (women; both 1 title)

The IFAF Americas Continental Flag Football Championship is the international flag football championship that is contested biannually, organized by IFAF Americas, which is the Americas zone of the International Federation of American Football (IFAF).

The competition was first held in 2023 in Charlotte, North Carolina.

== History ==
On March 8, 2023, it was announced that a continental flag football championship for the Americas region would be held for the first time later that year, the first of three continental championships which would serve as a qualifying path for the IFAF Flag Football World Championship.

The inaugural IFAF Americas Continental Flag Football Championship was held from July 5 to 7, 2023, in Charlotte, North Carolina, featuring 13 teams from seven countries. In the men's final, the United States beat Mexico, 40–36, thanks to a game-winning touchdown pass from Laderrick Smith to Laval Davis. In the women's final, the United States beat Mexico, 26–21, after Vanita Krouch threw four touchdowns to Madison Fulford. It was held in conjunction with the Junior Flag International Cup, a competition between boys’ and girls’ 15U and 17U national teams, and The One Flag Championship, the national club championship from ages 6U to adult.

On May 5, 2025, Panama was announced as the host of the second IFAF Americas Continental Flag Football Championship to be held from September 12 to 14 in Panama City. Additionally, it was announced that the inaugural IFAF Americas Youth Flag Football Championships for U15 and U17 boys’ and girls’ national teams would be held concurrently.

== Results ==
=== Men ===
Year	Host country	Gold medal game			Bronze medal game		
Year	Host country	Gold	Score	Silver	Bronze	Score	Fourth place
2023; Details	Charlotte, United States	United States	40–36	Mexico	Panama	38–22	Canada
2025; Details	Penonomé, Panama	United States and Mexico (Note: In 2025, due to the weather, the women's final was suspended and Mexico were named champions as they led 12–0; the men's final was cancelled and the finalists were named co-champions.)			Canada	32–22	Panama

=== Women ===
Year	Host country	Gold medal game			Bronze medal game		
Year	Host country	Gold	Score	Silver	Bronze	Score	Fourth place
2023; Details	Charlotte, United States	United States	26–21	Mexico	Canada	20–14	Panama
2025; Details	Penonomé, Panama	Mexico	12–0	Canada	United States	26–18	Panama

== Medals ==
=== Men ===
Rank	Nation	Gold	Silver	Bronze	Total
1	United States	2	0	0	2
2	Mexico	1	1	0	2
3	Canada	0	0	1	1
3	Panama	0	0	1	1
Totals (4 entries)		3	1	2	6

=== Women ===
Rank	Nation	Gold	Silver	Bronze	Total
1	Mexico	1	1	0	2
2	United States	1	0	1	2
3	Canada	0	1	1	2
Totals (3 entries)		2	2	2	6
