= Simone Alinovi =

Italian football player (born 1997)

Personal information
- Born: November 5, 1997 (age 29) Parma, Italy
- Height: 5 ft 11 in (180 cm)
- Weight: 182 lb (83 kg; 13 st 0 lb)
- Football career

No. 20 – Parma Panthers
- Positions: Safety, wide receiver

Career history
- Parma Panthers (2014); Parma Panthers (2016–present)

Awards and highlights
- 3x Italian League champion (2021, 2023–2024); European Champion (2021)
Medal record
Representing Italy
Men's American football
European Championship
Gold medal – first place	2021 Europe	Team
Men's flag football
World Championship
Silver medal – second place	2026 Düsseldorf	Team
European Championship
Gold medal – first place	2025 Paris	Team

Simone Alinovi (born November 5, 1997) is an Italian gridiron football safety and wide receiver for the Parma Panthers of the Italian Football League (IFL). He is a three-time Italian Bowl champion. He has also represented Italy internationally in both American football and flag football, where he is a European champion in both sports and a World Championship silver medalist in the latter.

== Early life and career ==
Alinovi became passionate about American football following a visit from the Parma Panthers to the middle school he attended and watching the anime Eyeshield 21. At the age of 14, he joined the youth sector of the Panthers, with whom he won the Under-19 Scudetto in 2013.

== Professional career ==
In the 2014 season, Alinovi made his debut in the Italian Football League (IFL). In March 2014, he was the only European player to be called up by the Stars & Stripes team to play in the friendly match of the annual Global Bowl event. In 2016, he started playing with the Panthers again, after not having being part of them in the 2015 season. In the 2021 season, after his team defeated the Guelfi Firenze in the semifinals 55–20, where he scored two touchdowns, Alinovi was able to participate in the Italian Bowl for the first time. At Italian Bowl XL, he scored the winning touchdown, resulting in the Panthers defeating the defending champions the Milano Seamen 40–34, winning the Italian bowl for the first time.

After winning Italian Bown XL, Alinovi made his debut in the Italian flag football championship with the Hedgehogs Boschetto. He was unable to participate in the national finals but the team still finished in fourth place.

In the 2023 season, Alinovi won his second Italian Bowl after the Panthers defeated the Guelfi 29–13. The following season, he won his third Italian Bowl after the Panthers defeated the Guelfi once again 38–26.

== National team career ==
=== American football ===
In 2019, Alinovi was called up to the Italy national team for the first time to play the first of the two qualifying matches for the 2021 European Championship, against Austria. On October 31, 2021, he became European champion with the national team after defeating Sweden in the final of the European Championship 41–14, in which he also scored two touchdowns.

=== Flag football ===
On November 24, 2021, Alinovi was called up to the Italy national team for the IFAF Men's Flag Football World Championship in Israel. On December 7, on the second day of the tournament, he scored a touchdown against Brazil in a 48–21 victory, then repeated the feat in the quarterfinal against Austria, allowing the team to advance to the semifinal. At the end of the tournament, Italy finished in fourth place after losing to Mexico in the semifinal and Panama in the bronze medal match.

In 2025, Alinovi was part of the Italian squad that won the IFAF Men's European Flag Football Championship. This led his team to qualify for the 2026 IFAF Men's Flag Football World Championship in Düsseldorf, where they qualified for the flag football tournament of the 2028 Summer Olympics in Los Angeles by virtue of being a finalist. They finished second and lost to the United States in the final.
