= Ja'Deion High =

American flag football player

- High in 2026

Personal information
- Born: Hereford, Texas, U.S.
- Height: 5 ft 11 in (180 cm)
- Weight: 190 lb (86 kg; 13 st 8 lb)
- Football career

No. 88
- Position: Wide receiver

Career information
- High school: Hereford (Hereford, Texas)
- College: Texas Tech (2013–2018)
- NFL draft: 2019: undrafted

Career history
- Arizona Cardinals (2019)*
- * Offseason or practice squad member only
Medal record
Men's flag football
Representing United States
IFAF World Championship
Gold medal – first place	2024 Lahti	Team
IFAF Americas Continental Championship
Gold medal – first place	2025 Penonomé	Team

Ja'Deion Thearry High is an American flag football player who represents the United States men's national flag football team. He previously played college football for the Texas Tech Red Raiders. High won a gold medal with the U.S. national team at the 2024 IFAF Men's Flag Football World Championship.

== Early life ==
High was born in Hereford, Texas, to Elva and J.D. High. He has five siblings. His given name was a combination of his father's initials (short for John David) and Deion Sanders's first name. High grew up on a ranch, which he helped tend to until departing for college. "My jobs included taking care of the animals, feeding, cleaning stalls, building fences and barns and tending to the fields so the livestock could graze," he recalled. The ranch included pigs, goats, sheep, and occasionally, horses, cows, and chickens.

High attended Hereford High School in Hereford, Texas, where he played on the school's football team. As a senior, he tallied 60 receptions for 860 yards with eight touchdowns, earning first team All-District 4-4A honors at both wide receiver and defensive back. High was also a standout baseball player at Hereford, garnering first-team All-District 4-4A honors as a senior, in addition to playing basketball.

High was a zero-star recruit, according to 247Sports. He did not receive any NCAA Division I scholarship offers to play college football.

== College career ==
He's the versatile, jack of all trades, Swiss army knife, if you will. If we need somebody anywhere, he can go.

— Texas Tech head coach Kliff Kingsbury on High's versatility at wide receiver

High enrolled at Texas Tech University and joined the football team, the Red Raiders, as a preferred walk-on. He took a redshirt season as a freshman in 2013. High then appeared in four games in 2014, mainly in a special teams role. In 2015, he played in nine games and made five starts, tallying eight receptions for 111 yards. High also recovered crucial onside kicks to secure consecutive victories over Kansas State and Texas. He was awarded a scholarship by Texas Tech the following offseason, during 2016 fall camp.

In 2016, High played in the first three games before suffering a season-ending injury, which forced him to undergo surgery on his right foot. He finished the year with six catches for 54 yards and one touchdown. Following his return from injury, High played in all 13 games in 2017 as a key reserve behind four future NFL receivers; he recorded seven catches for 58 yards. He was named the Big 12 Conference Special Teams Player of the Week after he blocked a punt to set up a key touchdown in a 52–45 win over Arizona State. High was granted a sixth season of eligibility for the 2018 season. In his final collegiate season, he played 12 games and made nine starts, racking up 62 receptions for 804 yards and four touchdowns as the Red Raiders' second-leading receiver. His longest play was a 62-yard touchdown catch on a pass from Jett Duffey in a 17–14 win over TCU. High was nominated for the Burlsworth Trophy, given to the best player who started out as a walk-on.

High finished his collegiate career with 83 receptions for 1,027 yards and five touchdowns in 40 games played. He subsequently received an invite to the Arizona Cardinals mini camp.

== Flag football career ==
After ending his tackle football career, High began playing flag football, a sport his father previously played. "It was a way to remain competitive and a reason to travel to places I hadn't been before," he said. While learning the sport, High was initially surprised at defenders pulling his flag despite him using his best juke moves; he eventually learned the "unique hip dips and flips" needed to avoid his flag being pulled.

In March 2024, High was invited to a U.S. men's national team training camp in Charlotte, North Carolina. He was one of 18 players selected to compete for a spot on Team USA's roster for the 2024 IFAF Men's Flag Football World Championship. Based on his performance at the camp, which took place in late May and early June, he was named to the final 12-man roster. High posted 509 receiving yards and 10 touchdowns across seven games at the 2024 World Championship in Finland. In the final, he had three catches for 72 yards and two touchdowns in a 53–21 win over Austria at Lahti Stadium, helping the U.S. capture its fifth consecutive gold medal.

In June 2025, High competed at the USA Football Summer Series. He was also named to the final 12-man roster for the 2025 IFAF Americas Continental Flag Football Championship. High caught two touchdowns in a 32–12 semifinal win over Panama. However, the gold medal game against Mexico was cancelled due to inclement weather and both teams were named co-champions.

In February 2026, High played in the USA vs. Mexico Flag Football Showcase, an exhibition game against Mexico held in San Francisco as a part of the Super Bowl Experience ahead of Super Bowl LX. He led all receivers with five receptions for 62 yards and two touchdowns in a 35–34 win. The following month, High represented Team USA in the Fanatics Flag Football Classic against current and former NFL players. He had a tournament-high four touchdown receptions as Team USA won all three games en route to the title.

== Personal life ==
High graduated from Texas Tech University with a degree in kinesiology. His uncle, Wayne High, was the star running back on Hereford High's state semifinal team in 1981.

As of 2025, High was working as an 18-wheeler truck driver in the Lubbock area, using his paid time off to represent the U.S. national team.
