= Maxym Lavallée =

Canadian flag football player (born 1998)

Personal information
- Born: July 22, 1998 (age 28) Gatineau, Quebec, Canada
- Height: 5 ft 8 in (173 cm)
- Weight: 190 lb (86 kg; 13 st 8 lb)
- Football career

Profile
- Position: Defensive back

Career information
- University: Laval (2018–2023)
- CFL draft: 2023: 8th round, 68th overall pick

Career history
- 2023: Montreal Alouettes*
- 2024: Montreal Alouettes*
- * Offseason or practice squad member only

Awards and highlights
- Vanier Cup champion (2018, 2022)
Medal record
Representing Canada
Men's flag football
World Championship
Bronze medal – third place	2026 Düsseldorf	Team
IFAF Americas Continental Championship
Bronze medal – third place	2025 Penonomé	Team

Maxym Lavallée (born July 22, 1998) is a Canadian flag football and former professional football player. He plays as a defensive back and is a member of the Canada national team. He played U Sports football at Université Laval in the same position and is a two-time Vanier Cup champion.

== University career ==
Lavallée played U Sports football for the Laval Rouge et Or from 2018 to 2023. During his time with the Rouge et Or, he won the 54th and 57th Vanier Cup. Individually, he won the 2018 defensive rookie of the year, and in 2022, he was named to the RSEQ all-star team.

== Professional football career ==
Lavallée was drafted in the eighth round, 68th overall, by the Montreal Alouettes in the 2023 CFL draft and signed with the team on May 11, 2023. Following 2023 training camp, he returned to Laval to complete his university eligibility.

On January 10, 2024, it was announced that Lavallée had re-signed with the Alouettes to a three-year contract. However, he was released on June 1.

== Flag football career ==
On May 28, 2025, Lavallée was named to the Canada men's national flag football team. In September, he was part of the Canadian squad that competed in the IFAF Americas Continental Men's Flag Football Championship held in Penonomé, Panama, where they defeated Panama in the bronze medal match. In August 2026, he was part of the Canadian squad that won the bronze medal in the IFAF Men's Flag Football World Championship held in Düsseldorf, Germany, enabling the team to qualify the 2028 Summer Olympics in Los Angeles.
