= Darrell Doucette =

American flag football player (born 1989)

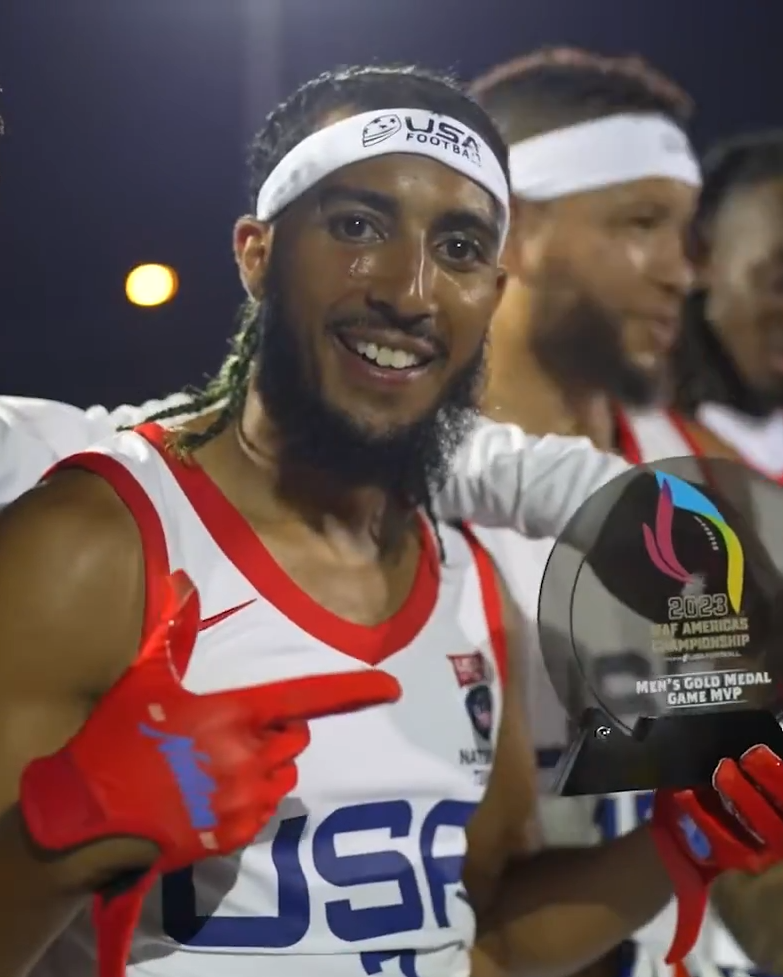
- Doucette in 2023

Personal information
- Born: June 29, 1989 (age 37) New Orleans, Louisiana, U.S.
- Height: 5 ft 7 in (170 cm)
- Football career

Profile
- Position: Quarterback

Career history
- 2020–: United States
Medal record
Representing United States
World Games
Gold medal – first place	2022 Birmingham	Team
IFAF World Championship
Gold medal – first place	2021 Jerusalem	Team
Gold medal – first place	2024 Lahti	Team
Gold medal – first place	2026 Düsseldorf	Team
IFAF Americas Continental Championship
Gold medal – first place	2023 Charlotte	Team
Gold medal – first place	2025 Penonomé	Team

Darrell "Housh" Doucette III (born June 29, 1989) is an American flag football player who is a quarterback for the United States men's national flag football team.

== Career ==
Doucette grew up in New Orleans, the son of an NOPD homicide detective, Darrell Doucette Jr. He attended St. Simon Peter Elementary School in New Orleans East and Saint Augustine High School before Hurricane Katrina in 2005. Doucette played multiple sports growing up, including track and field, tackle football, and bowling, in which he won state championships. He attended Xavier University of Louisiana, where he got into flag football on an intramural team. He is nicknamed "Housh" for his resemblance of NFL player T. J. Houshmandzadeh.

Doucette led the amateur side Fighting Cancer to win the first edition of the American Flag Football League in 2018, being named the most valuable player of the final in which his team defeated a team of professional track and field athletes and NFL players 26–6.

Doucette joined the United States national team in 2020. He led the United States to its fourth world title in a row at the 2021 IFAF Men's Flag Football World Championship. He won a gold medal for the United States at the 2022 World Games, the sport's first appearance at the event. He was named the most valuable player of the final game of the 2023 IFAF Americas Continental Flag Football Championship, where the United States went 7–0 to win the tournament. He defended his country's world title at the 2024 IFAF Men's Flag Football World Championship, the same month that he said in a viral interview that NFL players should not expect to be handed spots on the Olympic team over longtime flag football players when the sport makes its debut at the 2028 Summer Olympics.

On March 21, 2026, Doucette and Team USA won the inaugural Fanatics Flag Football Classic. Team USA won all three of its games at the tournament, outscoring two teams of former and current NFL stars by a combined score of 106–44. Doucette was named the tournament MVP after completing all eight of his passes for 67 yards and three touchdowns, rushing six times for 76 yards and three touchdowns, and catching five passes for 79 yards.
