= Philippines men's national flag football team =

Philippines
Logo

National team information
- Federation: American Tackle Football Federation of the Philippines
- IFAF continental area: Asia

Personnel
- Head coach: (United States) Keya Zarei

Nickname
- Agila Pilipinas

The Philippines men's national flag football team represents the Philippines in men's international flag football matches.

== History ==
The American Tackle Football Federation of the Philippines has expressed intention to form the first Philippines men's national flag football team as early as 2013. They took part at the IFAF Asia Flag Football Championship; the 2015 edition in Ho Chi Minh City, Vietnam, and the 2017 edition at home in Taguig.

The Agila Pilipinas reorganized in 2023, with its roster mostly consisting of beginners. They made their international debut at the inaugural 2023 IFAF Men's Asia-Oceania Flag Football Championship in Malaysia, finishing in 9th place.

The team has also participated in the 2025 IFAF Men's Asia-Oceania Flag Football Championship in Ningbo, China, finishing the tournament in 4th place in Asia.

The team has also won the inaugural Southeast Asia Flag Football Championship (SEAFFC) held in Jakarta, Indonesia on October 16-18, 2026.

== Players ==
=== Former squad ===
The following are players for the 2023 IFAF Asia Oceania Flag Football Championships.

- 1 – RD Valdez
- 5 – Aaron Velasquez
- 7 – Henric Fabros
- 9 – Julian Buban
- 10 – Bry Reyes
- 14 – Migs de la Peña
- 16 – Brian Lonzaga
- 21 – King Biray
- 24 – Franklin Ching
- 27 – Dags Mambuhay
- 28 – Ceejay Baldo
- 91 – Idol Ibañez

== Competitive record ==
=== IFAF Flag Football World Championship ===
Year	Position	GP	W	L	PF	PA
(United States) 2016	Did not qualify					
(Panama) 2018	Did not qualify					
(Israel) 2021	Did not enter or qualify					
(Finland) 2024	Did not qualify					
(Germany) 2026	Did not qualify					

=== Olympic Games ===
Year	Position	GP	W	L	PF	PA
(United States) 2028	To be determined					

=== IFAF Asia Flag Football Championship ===
Year	Position	GP	W	D	L	PF	PA
(Vietnam) 2015	4th place	5	3	0	2	140	89
(Philippines) 2017	4th place	5	2	1	2	175	154

=== IFAF Asia Oceania Flag Football Championship ===
Year	Position	GP	W	L	PF	PA
(Malaysia) 2023	9th place	7	2	5	—N/a	—N/a
(China) 2025	5th place	2	3	2	160	136

=== Southeast Asia Flag Football Championship ===
Year	Position	GP	W	L	PF	PA
(Indonesia) 2026	Champions	6	5	1	218	122

== Head coaches ==
- (United States) Keya Zarei (2025)
