= Beach flag football at the 2014 Asian Beach Games =

- Venue: Saphan Hin
- Dates: 12–14 November 2014

Beach flag football competition at the 2014 Asian Beach Games was held in Phuket, Thailand from 12 to 14 November 2014 at Saphan Hin Sports Center.

== Medalists ==
Event	Gold	Silver	Bronze
Men	Thailand; Anawin Tangpongpaiboon; Suppanut Rujanaporn; Suthanai Wanitcharakkhakul; Nattapat Chantrarotvanich; Chitpol Kamojarasboworn; Suton Pengsang; Rachaphan Khanthong; Phithaya Saranloet; Natthaphon Woranam; Wuttikorn Harnwongphaiboon	Kuwait; Fahad Al-Bahri; Saad Al-Sayyar; Saud Al-Saleh; Bader Mohammad; Bekhait Al-Bekhait; Jafar Al-Shatti; Nawaf Al-Saad; Faisal Farhan; Dawoud Abdullah; Dhari Al-Dhafiri	China; Chen Kaiwen; Zhang Chao; Liu Guanjun; Feng Wenru; Fu Yingli; Chen Yongqiang; Lü Peng; Wang Jianhua; Liu Huachuan; Ma Chong
Men	Thailand; Anawin Tangpongpaiboon; Suppanut Rujanaporn; Suthanai Wanitcharakkhakul; Nattapat Chantrarotvanich; Chitpol Kamojarasboworn; Suton Pengsang; Rachaphan Khanthong; Phithaya Saranloet; Natthaphon Woranam; Wuttikorn Harnwongphaiboon	Kuwait; Fahad Al-Bahri; Saad Al-Sayyar; Saud Al-Saleh; Bader Mohammad; Bekhait Al-Bekhait; Jafar Al-Shatti; Nawaf Al-Saad; Faisal Farhan; Dawoud Abdullah; Dhari Al-Dhafiri	Japan; Yoshihiro Shindo; Kenta Tanei; Yoshiya Nishioka; Yu Horita; Ayumu Iwai; Naoki Yoshimatsu; Keita Suzuki; Kyohei Shimizu; Kotaro Chiba; Keisuke Narita

== Results ==
=== Preliminaries ===
Pos	Team	Pld	W	D	L	PF	PA	PD	Pts
1	Thailand	5	5	0	0	297	125	+172	15
2	Japan	5	4	0	1	248	119	+129	12
3	Kuwait	5	3	0	2	233	146	+87	9
4	China	5	2	0	3	209	227	−18	6
5	Philippines	5	1	0	4	122	215	−93	3
6	India	5	0	0	5	76	353	−277	0

Source: OCA

12 November; 8:00	Thailand	79–18	India	Saphan Hin, Phuket
12 November; 8:00		(45–6)		Saphan Hin, Phuket

12 November; 9:00	Japan	41–36	Kuwait	Saphan Hin, Phuket
12 November; 9:00		(27–18)		Saphan Hin, Phuket

12 November; 10:00	Philippines	26–32	China	Saphan Hin, Phuket
12 November; 10:00		(14–24)		Saphan Hin, Phuket

12 November; 11:00	Kuwait	34–40	Thailand	Saphan Hin, Phuket
12 November; 11:00		(13–19)		Saphan Hin, Phuket

12 November; 12:00	China	105–12	India	Saphan Hin, Phuket
12 November; 12:00		(47–6)		Saphan Hin, Phuket

12 November; 13:00	Japan	61–6	Philippines	Saphan Hin, Phuket
12 November; 13:00		(34–6)		Saphan Hin, Phuket

12 November; 14:00	Thailand	72–13	China	Saphan Hin, Phuket
12 November; 14:00		(43–0)		Saphan Hin, Phuket

12 November; 15:00	Philippines	12–41	Kuwait	Saphan Hin, Phuket
12 November; 15:00		(0–16)		Saphan Hin, Phuket

12 November; 16:00	India	12–55	Japan	Saphan Hin, Phuket
12 November; 16:00		(6–29)		Saphan Hin, Phuket

13 November; 8:00	Philippines	24–67	Thailand	Saphan Hin, Phuket
13 November; 8:00		(18–41)		Saphan Hin, Phuket

13 November; 9:00	Japan	55–26	China	Saphan Hin, Phuket
13 November; 9:00		(28–6)		Saphan Hin, Phuket

13 November; 10:00	Kuwait	60–20	India	Saphan Hin, Phuket
13 November; 10:00		(35–6)		Saphan Hin, Phuket

13 November; 11:00	Thailand	39–36	Japan	Saphan Hin, Phuket
13 November; 11:00		(12–12)		Saphan Hin, Phuket

13 November; 12:00	India	14–54	Philippines	Saphan Hin, Phuket
13 November; 12:00		(12–30)		Saphan Hin, Phuket

13 November; 13:00	China	33–62	Kuwait	Saphan Hin, Phuket
13 November; 13:00		(27–32)		Saphan Hin, Phuket

=== Knockout round ===
Semifinals
13 November
Thailand	50
China	13
13 November
Japan	34
Kuwait	40

Gold medal match
14 November
Thailand	58
Kuwait	39

==== Semifinals ====
13 November; 15:00	Thailand	50–13	China	Saphan Hin, Phuket
13 November; 15:00		(21–13)		Saphan Hin, Phuket

13 November; 16:00	Japan	34–40	Kuwait	Saphan Hin, Phuket
13 November; 16:00		(27–14)		Saphan Hin, Phuket

==== Gold medal match ====
14 November; 9:30	Thailand	58–39	Kuwait	Saphan Hin, Phuket
14 November; 9:30		(39–12)		Saphan Hin, Phuket
