= United States men's national flag football team =

United States
Logo

National team information
- Federation: USA Football
- IFAF continental area: Americas

Personnel
- Head coach: Jorge Cascudo

Championships
- IFAF World Championship: 9 Gold (2010, 2014, 2016, 2018, 2021, 2024, 2026); Silver (2012)
- IFAF Americas Continental Championship: 2 Gold (2023, 2025)

United States men's national flag football team
Medal record

World Championship
Gold medal – first place	2010 Ottawa	Team
Gold medal – first place	2014 Grosseto	Team
Gold medal – first place	2016 Miami	Team
Gold medal – first place	2018 Panama City	Team
Gold medal – first place	2021 Jerusalem	Team
Gold medal – first place	2024 Lahti	Team
Gold medal – first place	2026 Düsseldorf	Team
Silver medal – second place	2012 Gothenburg	Team

World Games
Gold medal – first place	2022 Birmingham	Team

Americas Continental Championship
Gold medal – first place	2023 Charlotte	Team
Gold medal – first place	2025 Penonomé	Team

The United States men's national flag football team, often referred to as Team USA, represents the United States in men's international flag football competitions. The team is governed by USA Football. As of 2025, the International Federation of American Football (IFAF) ranked the United States men's team 1st worldwide.

Team USA has won the IFAF Flag Football World Championship seven times, most recently in 2026. The team also won a gold medal at the 2022 World Games and the IFAF Americas Continental Flag Football Championship two times, most recently in 2025.

== Competitive record ==
Champions Runners-up Third place Fourth place

=== Olympic Games ===
Olympic Games
Year	Result	Pos	Pld	W	D	L	PF	PA
(United States) 2028	Qualified as host							
Total	0 title	0/1						

=== IFAF World Championship ===
IFAF Flag Football World Championship
Year	Result	Pos	Pld	W	D	L	PF	PA
(Austria) 2002	Did not participate							
(France) 2004	Did not participate							
(South Korea) 2006	Did not participate							
(Canada) 2008	Fourth place	4th						
(Canada) 2010	Champions	1st						
(Sweden) 2012	Runners-up	2nd						
(Italy) 2014	Champions	1st						
(United States) 2016	Champions	1st						
(Panama) 2018	Champions	1st						
(Israel) 2021	Champions	1st	7	7	0	0	392	125
(Finland) 2024	Champions	1st	7	7	0	0	370	111
(Germany) 2026	Champions	1st	6	5	0	1	255	187
Total	7 titles	9/12						

=== World Games ===
World Games
Year	Result	Pos	Pld	W	D	L	PF	PA
(United States) 2022	Champions	1st	6	6	0	0	205	89
Total	1 title	1/1	6	6	0	0	205	89

=== IFAF Americas Continental Championship ===
IFAF Americas Continental Flag Football Championship
Year	Result	Pos	Pld	W	D	L	PF	PA
(United States) 2023	Champions	1st						
(Panama) 2025	Champions (Note: In 2025, due to the weather, the final was cancelled and the finalists United States and Mexico have been declared joint champions.)	1st	5	5	0	0	252	65
Total	2 titles	2/2						

== IFAF World Championship ==
=== 2008 ===
Although the IFAF Flag Football Championship was established in 2002, Team USA made its debut in the 2008 tournament. The United States finished in fourth place after losing the bronze medal game to France with a score of 45–0.

=== 2010 ===
In the 2010 tournament, which took place in Canada, Team USA defeated Germany 33–0 in the quarterfinals, Canada 48–25 in the semifinals, and Denmark 35–19 in the finals, earning their first gold in the tournament.

=== 2012 ===
At the 2012 tournament, Team USA reached the final but was narrowly defeated by Austria with a final score of 47–40, earning the silver medal.

=== 2014 ===
Team USA reclaimed the gold medal at the 2014 tournament by defeating Mexico 40–14 in the championship game.

=== 2016 ===
The 2016 tournament saw another victory for Team USA, as they narrowly defeated Denmark 33–32 in the gold medal game. This marked their second consecutive and third overall championship win, repeating their success against Denmark from the 2010 final.

=== 2018 ===
Team USA claimed its third consecutive and fourth overall title at the 2018 World Championship. They went undefeated in pool play, defeating Israel in the quarterfinals and Denmark in the semifinals after a much closer encounter in pool play. In the final, Team USA won against Austria with the score of 19–13. Led by quarterback Eric Holliday, the team made history as the first to achieve three consecutive championships in IFAF history across either the men's or women's divisions.

=== 2021 ===
The 2021 tournament was originally expected to take place in Demark in 2020, but as a result of the COVID-19 pandemic, it was rescheduled to be held in Israel in 2021. The United States men's team won the final round, defeating Mexico 44–41 in the final game. Until the last ten minutes, Mexico had been winning with a score of 41–30. The Americans entered the lead with a little over a minute to go.

=== 2024 ===
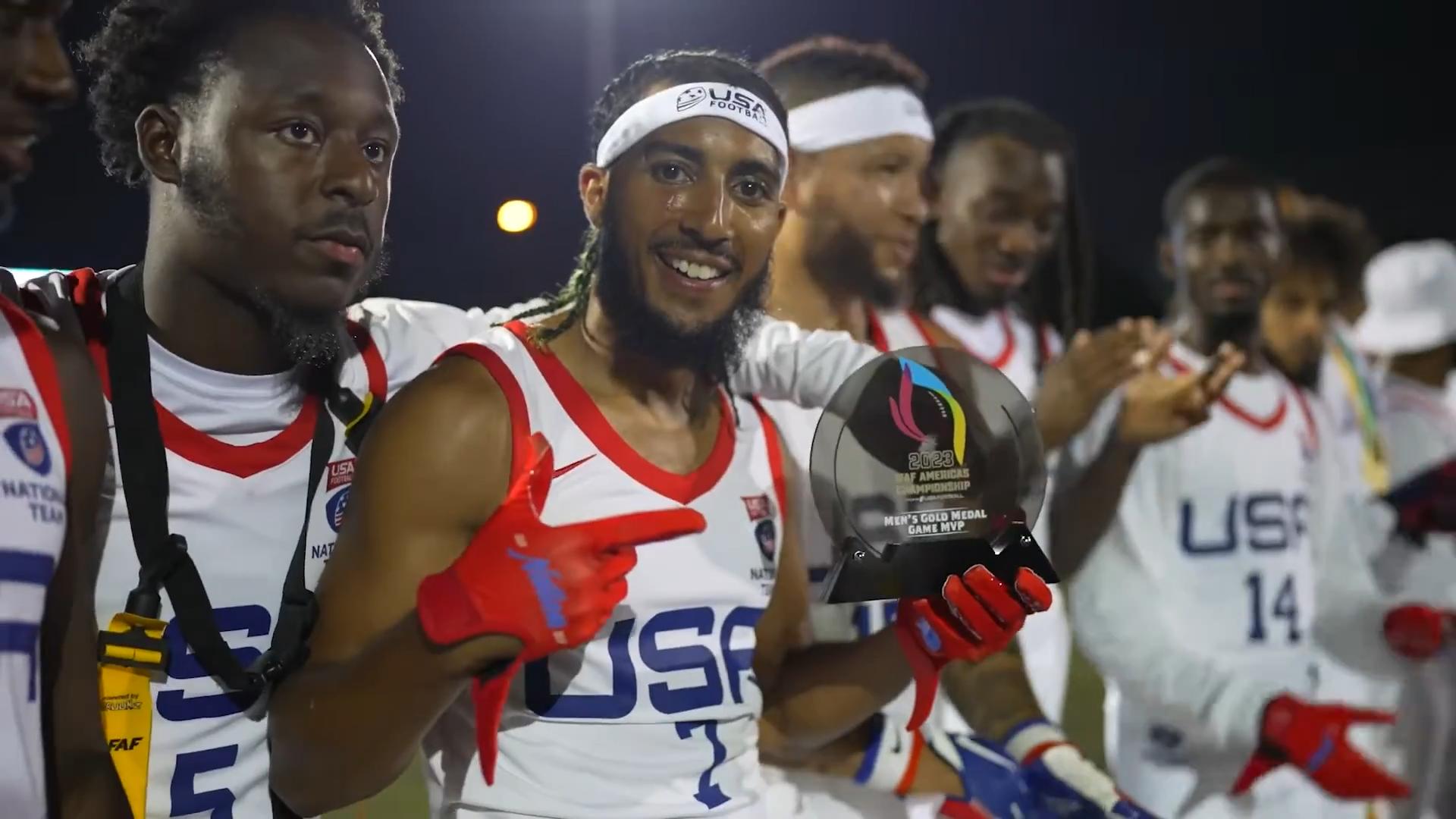
Darrell Doucette with the U.S. national team

In the 2024 tournament, Team USA won their fifth consecutive championship title. They went undefeated throughout the tournament, winning every game by at least 25 points. Quarterback Darrell Doucette led the team with an outstanding performance in the final, throwing six touchdown passes to four different receivers in a 53–21 victory over Austria.

=== 2026 ===
In the 2026 tournament, Team USA won its sixth consecutive and seventh overall world championship title. The tournament was held in Düsseldorf, Germany, and served as the first Olympic qualifier for flag football's debut at the 2028 Summer Olympics. Despite recording the highest point differential in group play, the Americans finished second in their group after suffering a 41–34 loss to American Samoa, ending their 14-year unbeaten streak in IFAF World Championship competition.

The United States advanced to the knockout stage by defeating Japan 45–38 in the quarterfinals before edging Mexico 42–40 in a closely contested semifinal. In the championship game, quarterback Darrell Doucette threw four touchdown passes as Team USA defeated Italy 46–26 to secure a seventh world title. Doucette was subsequently named the tournament's Most Valuable Player.

== World Games ==
=== 2022 ===
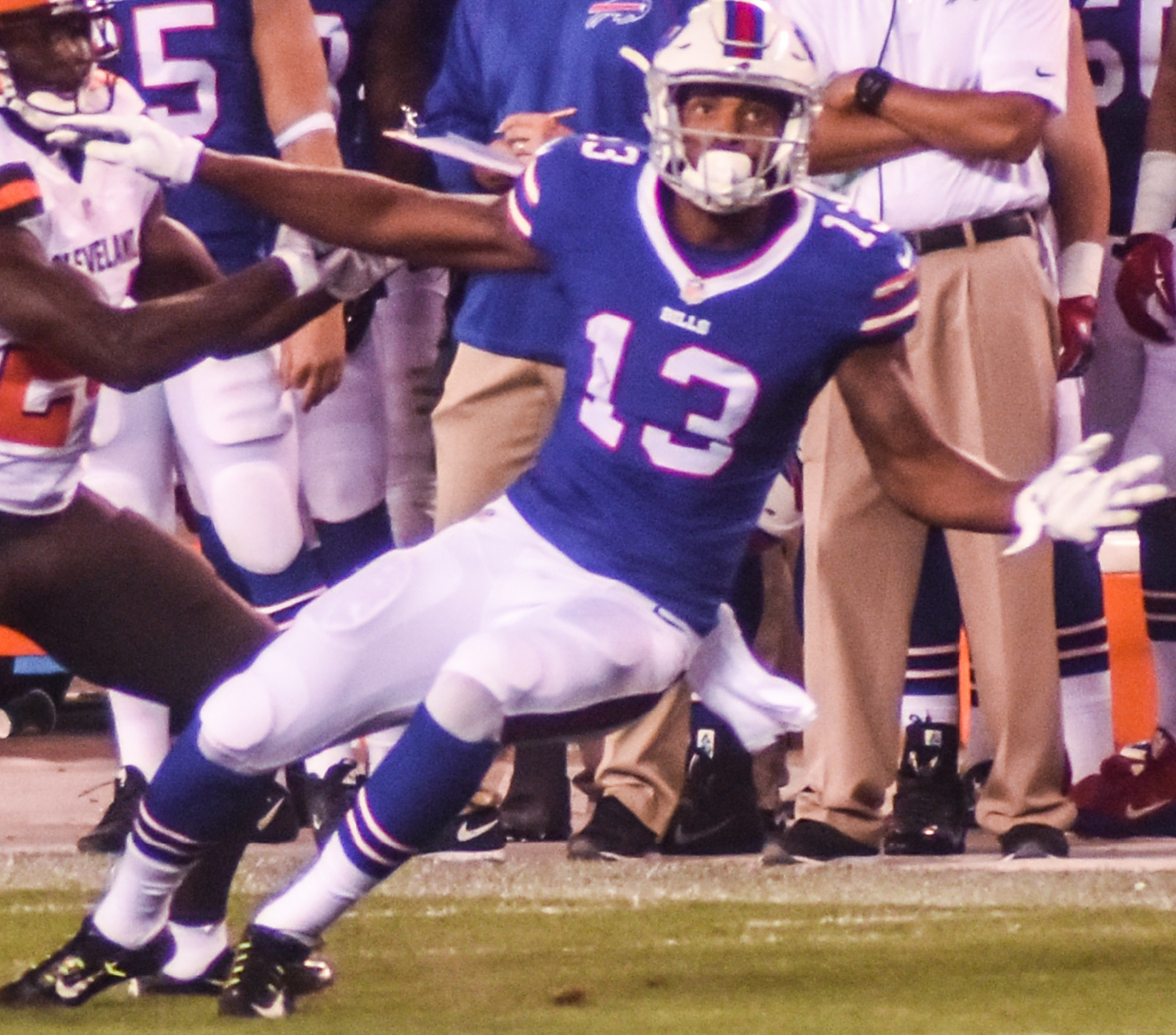
Dezmin Lewis, pictured here as a member of the Buffalo Bills in 2015, played on Team USA during the 2022 World Games.

Flag football made a debut in the multi-disciplinary sports event World Games for 2022 edition that was held in Birmingham, Alabama. The tournament was hosted at Birmingham's Legion Field and was held from July 10 to 14.

Team USA scored 3–0 in pool play, and defeated Germany in the quarterfinals, Austria in the semifinals, and Italy by 46–36 in the final game.

== Summer Olympics ==
=== Flag Football at the 2028 Summer Olympics ===
In October 2023, flag football was officially approved as a sport for the 2028 Summer Olympics in Los Angeles by IOC, in collaboration with NFL and IFAF. This marks the first time flag football will be included in the Olympic Games. Additionally, it represents the first time any form of American football will appear in the Olympics since it was featured as a demonstration sport in 1904 and 1932. As the host country, Team USA will automatically qualify for the tournament.

NFL executive Peter O'Reilly stated that the league would collaborate with the players' union to allow current and former players to participate in the 2028 Summer Olympics.

== Fanatics Flag Football Classic ==
On March 21, 2026, Team USA won the inaugural Fanatics Flag Football Classic. Team USA won all three of its games at the tournament, outscoring two teams of former and current NFL stars by a combined score of 106–44.
