= USA Football =

Governing body of American gridiron football

- Formation: 2002; 24 years ago
- Type: Non-profit
- Headquarters: Indianapolis, Indiana, US
- Chairman: Peter W. Chiarelli
- Key people: Scott Hallenbeck (CEO and Executive Director), Jamie Riley (COO)
- Website: usafootball.com

USA Football is the national governing body of American football in the United States, having received formal certification from the U.S. Olympic & Paralympic Committee on April 17, 2025, becoming the 38th Summer Olympics national governing body. This distinction marked a significant milestone in American football history as USA Football became the sport's first national governing body.

As the governing body, USA Football selects, trains and leads the U.S. national teams (in both tackle and flag football disciplines) that represent the United States on the world's stage, including when flag football makes its Olympic debut in Los Angeles in 2028. USA Football is a member of the International Federation of American Football (IFAF).

USA Football was previously designated a Recognized Sports Organization by the USOPC on November 6, 2015.

USA Football was endowed by the National Football League (NFL) and the NFL Players Association (NFLPA) in 2002.

== U.S. national teams ==
USA Football is responsible for selecting, leading and training the men's and women's national teams that represent the country in international competitions, including when flag football makes its debut as an Olympic sport in the 2028 Summer Games in Los Angeles.

The United States Performance Center (USPC) is the U.S. National Team's elite sport performance and training partner. Located on the campus of the University of North Carolina at Charlotte, the USPC serves as the home of USA Football's adult and junior U.S. Flag National Team Trials and Training Camps.

USA Football fields tackle and flag football teams at a variety of age levels, this includes the men's and women's tackle teams and men's and women's flag teams. To represent the United States as part of the U.S. National Teams, athletes must go through the National Team Pathway.

The National Team Development Program (NTDP) is the primary pathway for flag football players aged 11–23 to level up their skills and compete for a Select Team roster spot and future U.S. National Team Trials invitations.

In 2024, USA Football announced the expansion of the NTDP for its 2025 cycle to provide more opportunities for athletes to develop alongside and compete against the nation's best flag football players.

=== Success ===
USA Football selects, trains and leads the U.S. National Teams in tackle and flag football disciplines. These teams represent the country in IFAF-sanctioned international competitions, including, Men's and Women's Tackle World Championships, Men's and Women's Flag Football World Championships, the World Games and ultimately the Olympics when flag football will make its debut on the world's stage at the Los Angeles Summer Games in 2028.

USA Football's national teams across both tackle football and flag football have been among the most successful in the world.

The Women's Tackle National Team has won all four of IFAF's world championships, taking gold in competitions in 2010, 2013, 2017 and 2022. The most recent gold medal-winning team was led by head coach Callie Brownson, a barrier-breaking college and professional coach who joined USA Football as Senior Director of High Performance and National Team Operations in 2025. Alumni of the USA Football's Women's Tackle National Team include current and former NFL coaches Angela Baker, Brownson, Katie Sowers and Jennifer Welter, four-time NAIA Women's Flag Finals Championship head coach Liz Sowers and Women's National Football Conference founder and CEO Odessa Jenkins.

The men's tackle national team has won three consecutive gold medals in the IFAF men's tackle events in 2007, 2011 and 2015. USA Football has also fielded U20 men's tackle teams, earning gold medals in 2009 and 2014.

USA Football's U.S. Men's Flag National Team have won five consecutive IFAF Flag Football World Championships, and the women have won the last three. These teams have featured quarterbacks Darrell "Housh" Doucette and Vanita Krouch.

In August 2024, the U.S. Men's and Women's National Teams successfully defended their status as the top-ranked teams in the world at the 2024 IFAF Flag Football World Championships in Lahti, Finland. The event featured 32 men's and 23 women's national teams from six continents, making it the largest competition ever held by IFAF.

The National Teams' journey from training camp to gold medals in Finland was profiled in the documentary film, Champions Rising: USA Football’s National Team The film, released in March 2025, is a behind-the-scenes inside look at what it takes to be world champions in flag football, challenging some misconceptions about the sport.

In 2025, the men's and women's teams competed in the IFAF Americas Continental Flag Football Championship, which features the top national teams from countries throughout North, Central and South America and serves as a qualifier for the next World Championships in 2026.

The women's team also competed in the 2025 World Games, an international multi-sport event comprising sports and sporting disciplines that are not contested in the Olympic Games, in August 2025 in Chengdu, China.

== Coach education and certification ==
USA Football is the global leader in youth football coaching education, with more than 1.2 million completed coach certifications in all 50 states and numerous countries across six continents through its Youth Coach Certification Program. The program is available for both flag and tackle disciplines.

== Board of Directors ==
In February 2022, Peter W. Chiarelli, a retired U.S. Army general, was named chairman of USA Football. He was preceded by Raymond Odierno, formerly the chief of staff of the U.S. Army, when he succeeded Carl Peterson in 2017.

As of April 2025, USA Football's Board of Directors includes:

- General Peter W. Chiarelli (Ret.), Chairman
- Amber Clark‡, University of St. Mary (Kan.)
- Sheneika Comice‡
- Mike Golic, TV/radio host and former NFL player
- Dr. Gerard Gioia, Children's National Hospital
- Ashlea Klam‡, Student-athlete; Keiser University (Fla.)
- Darcy Leslie‡, Hardware Strength & Conditioning
- Mark Murphy, Green Bay Packers
- Elizabeth Okey‡, Wintrust Financial Corporation
- Michelle Roque-Paskow‡, American Flag Football League
- Pete Ward, Indianapolis Colts

‡ USA Football National Team Alumnus

== International recognition ==
In May 2017, after a split that created rival groupings of the International Federation of American Football (IFAF), an IFAF grouping based in Paris stripped its recognition of USA Football, citing disputes over anti-doping enforcement, and recognized the United States Federation of American Football (USFAF) as the governing body of American football in the United States. USFAF organized a collegiate team to participate in the 2017 World Games, in which it won a bronze medal. The grouping of the IFAF based in New York continued to recognize USA Football, and organized the 2017 Women's World Championships, which the American team won.

In March 2018, the Court of Arbitration for Sport (CAS) determined that the IFAF entity in New York was the proper governing entity and voided all decisions of the IFAF entity in Paris, including their decision to strip USA Football of its recognition. USA Football is currently the internationally recognized governing body for American football in the United States.

USA Football has worked closely with IFAF and other IFAF Member Federations to improve the sport's accessibility, quality and competitiveness abroad. USA Football CEO Scott Hallenbeck has served as a board member, Treasurer and Vice President of IFAF. He first joined IFAF's leadership as a member of their board in 2006 and has served as Treasurer and Vice President for multiple terms each. He most recently held the title of Vice President from 2021 to 2024. USA Football Managing Director, High Performance and National Teams, Eric Mayes was elected at the end of 2024 to serve as IFAF's General Secretary.

== See also ==
- List of leagues of American and Canadian football
