= 2023 IFAF Americas Continental Men's Flag Football Championship =

Flag football championship

- 2023

Tournament information
- Sport: Flag football
- Location: Charlotte, North Carolina
- Dates: 5 July–7 July
- Host: United States
- Venue: 1
- Teams: 7

Final positions
- Champions: United States (1st title)
- Runner-up: Mexico
- 3rd place: Panama

The 2023 International Federation of American Football (IFAF) Americas Continental Men's Flag Football Championship was held from July 5–7 at the United States Performance Center at the University of North Carolina at Chapel Hill, Charlotte, North Carolina.

== Results ==
=== Round Robin ===
| Pos | Team | Pld | W | L | PF | PA | PD | United States | Mexico | Canada | Panama | Brazil | Chile | Argentina |
|---|---|---|---|---|---|---|---|---|---|---|---|---|---|---|
| 1 | United States | 6 | 6 | 0 | 280 | 104 | +176 | — | 56–30 | 36–12 | 42–31 | 56–12 | 56–07 | 34–12 |
| 2 | Mexico | 6 | 5 | 1 | 232 | 140 | +92 | 30–56 | — | 32–22 | 34–24 | 50–26 | 44–00 | 42–12 |
| 3 | Canada | 6 | 4 | 2 | 214 | 152 | +62 | 12–36 | 22–32 | — | 36–33 | 44–19 | 44–12 | 56–20 |
| 4 | Panama | 6 | 3 | 3 | 211 | 148 | +63 | 31–42 | 24–34 | 33–36 | — | 38–30 | 37–00 | 48–06 |
| 5 | Brazil | 6 | 2 | 4 | 160 | 220 | −60 | 12–56 | 26–50 | 19–44 | 30–38 | — | 36–12 | 37–20 |
| 6 | Chile | 6 | 1 | 5 | 56 | 223 | −167 | 07–56 | 00–44 | 12–44 | 00–37 | 12–36 | — | 25–06 |
| 7 | Argentina | 6 | 0 | 6 | 76 | 242 | −166 | 12–34 | 12–42 | 20–56 | 06–48 | 20–37 | 06–25 | — |

Updated to match(es) played on 7th July 2023. Source: https://ifafamericaschampionship.com/game-center

=== Final Round ===
==== Classification Games ====
| Date | Hour | Team 1 | Score | Team 2 |
|---|---|---|---|---|
| 7 July | 12:00 pm ET | Brazil | 26 - 18 | Chile |
| 7 July | 1:30 pm ET | Chile | 19 - 25 | Argentina |
| 7 July | 3:00 pm ET | Brazil | 27 - 24 | Argentina |

==== Bronze Medal Game ====
| Date | Hour | Team 1 | Score | Team 2 |
|---|---|---|---|---|
| 7 July | 3:00 pm ET | Canada | 22 - 38 | Panama |

==== Gold Medal Game ====
| Date | Hour | Team 1 | Score | Team 2 |
|---|---|---|---|---|
| 7 July | 7:30 pm ET | United States | 40 - 36 | Mexico |

== Final ranking ==
| 1st place, gold medalist(s) | United States |
| 2nd place, silver medalist(s) | Mexico |
| 3rd place, bronze medalist(s) | Panama |
| 4 | Canada |
| 5 | Brazil |
| 6 | Argentina |
| 7 | Chile |

== See also ==
- IFAF Americas Continental Flag Football Championship
- 2023 IFAF Americas Continental Women's Flag Football Championship
- 2024 IFAF Men's Flag Football World Championship
