= American Samoa men's national flag football team =

American Samoa

National team information
- Federation: American Samoa National Football Federation
- IFAF continental area: Oceania

General information
- Founded: 2025

Personnel
- Head coach: Sterling Carvalho

The American Samoa men's national flag football team represents the American Samoa in men's international flag football matches. It is managed by the American Samoa National Football Federation.

== History ==
American football has been a pastime in American Samoa contributing players to the National Football League in the continental United States. However Samoans have traditionally played tackle, not flag football.

American Samoa made their international debut at the 2025 IFAF Men's Asia-Oceania Flag Football Championship in Ningbo, China with Sterling Carvalho being the inaugural head coach. They finished third, defeating China in the Asia-Oceania bronze medal game.

The island territory debuted at the 2026 IFAF Men's Flag Football World Championship in Düsseldorf, Germany as the lowest ranked nation among the participating teams. They were noted to having caused an upset against the United States in the group stage, ending an undefeated streak in the world championship dating back to the 2012 edition when the US lost to Austria. They finished fifth in the tournament.

== Competitive record ==
=== IFAF Flag Football World Championship ===
Year	Position	GP	W	L	PF	PA
(Germany) 2026	5th place	6	4	2	179	173

=== Olympic Games ===
Year	Position	GP	W	L	PF	PA
(United States) 2028	To be determined					

=== IFAF Asia Oceania Flag Football Championship ===
Year	Position	GP	W	L	PF	PA
(China) 2025	3rd place	5	3	2	150	166

== Head coaches ==
- (American Samoa) Sterling Carvalho (2025–)
