= Canada men's national flag football team =

Men's national flag football team representing Canada

Canada

National team information
- Federation: Football Canada
- IFAF continental area: Americas

Championships
- World championships: 1: 2008

The Canada men's national flag football team represents Canada in men's international flag football matches. The team is governed by Football Canada.

Team Canada has won the IFAF Flag Football World Championship in 2008 and won a bronze medal in 2026. The team also won a bronze medal at the IFAF Americas Continental Flag Football Championship in 2025.

== History ==
The Canada men's team has received two medals at the IFAF Flag Football World Championship. At the 2008 game, they won their first (and only) world title by defeating Denmark in the finals. They lost to Italy in the bronze medal game in the 2010 and 2014 editions. Canada later qualified for the flag football tournament of the 2028 Summer Olympics in Los Angeles at the 2026 IFAF Flag Football World Championship, in which they lost to Italy in the semifinals and defeated Mexico in the bronze medal match.

IFAF Americas organizes flag football continental championships every two years to fall in between the world championships dubbed the IFAF Americas Continental Flag Football Championship. The Canada men's team competed in the 2023 edition, where they lost to Panama in the bronze medal match. They competed in the 2025 edition, where they defeated Panama in the bronze medal match.

== Competitive record ==
=== Olympic Games ===
Olympic Games
Year	Result	Pos	Pld	W	D	L	PF	PA
(United States) 2028	Qualified							
Total	0 title	0/1						
