= Fanatics Flag Football Classic =

2026 flag football tournament

Tournament information
- Sport: Flag football
- Location: Los Angeles, California
- Date: March 21, 2026
- Tournament format: Round-robin
- Host: Fanatics
- Venue: BMO Stadium
- Teams: 3

Final positions
- Champions: Team USA
- Runner-up: Wildcats FFC

Tournament statistics
- Matches played: 4
- MVP: Darrell Doucette

The Fanatics Flag Football Classic was a five-on-five flag football tournament featuring National Football League (NFL) players, members of the United States men's national flag football team, and celebrity guests. The exhibition was held on March 21, 2026, at BMO Stadium in Los Angeles and was organized in part to promote flag football at the Summer Olympics ahead of its debut at the 2028 Games.

The event was originally set to be held in Riyadh, which drew criticism from various sources over Saudi Arabia's poor human rights record and allegations of sportwashing. It was later moved to Los Angeles due to the outbreak of the 2026 Iran war. The event featured three teams, with the U.S. national team winning the round-robin tournament led by team captain and tournament MVP Darrell Doucette.

== Background ==
On September 15, 2025, a five-on-five flag football tournament called the Fanatics Flag Football Classic was announced as a partnership between Tom Brady, Fanatics, Inc., Fox Sports, and OBB Media. It was originally scheduled for March 21, 2026, at the Kingdom Arena in Riyadh, Saudi Arabia, as part of Riyadh Season, comprising three teams of eight current and former NFL players (including Brady) facing off in a round-robin tournament, with the top two teams advancing to a championship game. It was announced that it would be played under Olympic-style flag football rules, using a 50-yard field with two 10-yard end zones and two 20-minute halves, and that it would air on Fox Sports and Tubi with Kevin Hart as host.

The day after the official announcement, the NFL confirmed to ProFootballTalk that the tournament was "not a league initiative." On September 20, the league sent out a memo to all 32 teams, reiterating that it was "not an NFL-sanctioned event" and, therefore, not subject to the protections of the NFL collective bargaining agreement in the event of an injury.

At an event at the Intuit Dome in Inglewood, California, in January 2026, Brady revealed the named of the three teams – Founders, Wildcats, and Mustangs – along with their respective jerseys. He was joined onstage by Jayden Daniels, who was announced as the Wildcats captain. It was also revealed that the event would feature a performance from rapper Travis Scott.

On March 6, 2026, it was announced that the event would be relocated to BMO Stadium in Los Angeles due to the ongoing 2026 Iran war affecting Saudi Arabia, with the date to be determined. Three days later, a revamped format with three 12-player teams was announced. Two teams would be composed of current and former NFL players along with non-NFL athletes, while the third represented by the United States men's national flag football team. The Olympic rules were slightly modified, moving to 15-minute halves with a running clock on a 50-by-25-yard field, and the original date of March 21 was reinstated.

== Teams ==
The Fanatics Flag Football Classic featured three 12-player teams. Brady and Philadelphia Eagles quarterback Jalen Hurts served as co-captains of the Founders FFC, coached by Sean Payton of the Denver Broncos. Cincinnati Bengals quarterback Joe Burrow and Washington Commanders quarterback Jayden Daniels co-captained the Wildcats FFC, coached by Kyle Shanahan of the San Francisco 49ers. Additionally, Robert Saleh of the Tennessee Titans assisted both squads as a defensive specialist. Both teams filled out their rosters via a player draft on March 18, picking from a pool of 24 athletes. The third team was represented by the United States men's national flag football team, co-captained by Aamir Brown and Darrell Doucette and coached by Jorge Cascudo. The full list of participants was released on March 10, 2026.

=== Player draft ===
Team	Captains	Head coach
Founders FFC	Tom Brady; Jalen Hurts	Sean Payton
Wildcats FFC	Joe Burrow; Jayden Daniels	Kyle Shanahan
Team USA	Aamir Brown; Darrell Doucette	Jorge Cascudo

Draft pool

Running backs	Wide receivers / tight ends	Linebackers / defensive backs	Non-NFL players
Saquon Barkley; Ashton Jeanty; Alvin Kamara	Davante Adams; Odell Beckham Jr. Stefon Diggs; Rob Gronkowski; DeAndre Hopkins; Kyle Juszczyk; ~~Deebo Samuel~~ (Note: Announced as a participant but not drafted); DeVonta Smith	~~Myles Garrett~~; Derwin James; Luke Kuechly; Tyrann Mathieu; Von Miller; Jalen Ramsey	Terence Crawford; Logan Paul; IShowSpeed

=== Rosters ===
Founders FFC

- Tom Brady (QB)
- Terence Crawford (guest)
- Stefon Diggs (WR)
- Rob Gronkowski (TE)
- Damar Hamlin (DB) (Note: Added as a late replacement)
- Jalen Hurts (QB)
- Ashton Jeanty (RB)
- Alvin Kamara (RB)
- Von Miller (LB)
- Patrick Peterson (DB)
- DeVonta Smith (WR)
- Antoine Winfield Jr. (DB)

Wildcats FFC

- Davante Adams (WR)
- Saquon Barkley (RB)
- Odell Beckham Jr. (WR)
- Joe Burrow (QB)
- Jayden Daniels (QB)
- DeAndre Hopkins (WR)
- IShowSpeed (guest)
- ~~Derwin James (DB)~~ (Note: Withdrew due to injury)
- Kyle Juszczyk (RB)
- Luke Kuechly (LB)
- Logan Paul (guest)
- Jalen Ramsey (DB)
- Harrison Smith (DB)

Team USA

- Aamir Brown (DB/WR)
- Velton Brown Jr. (WR/DB)
- Isaiah Calhoun (DB/WR)
- Nico Casares (QB)
- Mike Daniels (DB/WR)
- Laval Davis (WR/Rusher)
- Tyler Davis (WR/DB)
- Darrell Doucette (QB)
- Ja'Deion High (WR/DB)
- Jamie Kennedy (DB/WR)
- Pablo Smith (WR/QB)
- Shawn Theard Jr. (Rusher/WR)

== Games ==
March 21; Round-robin	Team USA (United States)	39–14	Wildcats FFC	BMO Stadium, Los Angeles, California

March 21; Round-robin	Team USA (United States)	43–16	Founders FFC	BMO Stadium, Los Angeles, California

March 21; Round-robin	Wildcats FFC	34–26	Founders FFC	BMO Stadium, Los Angeles, California

March 21; Championship	Team USA (United States)	24–14	Wildcats FFC	BMO Stadium, Los Angeles, California

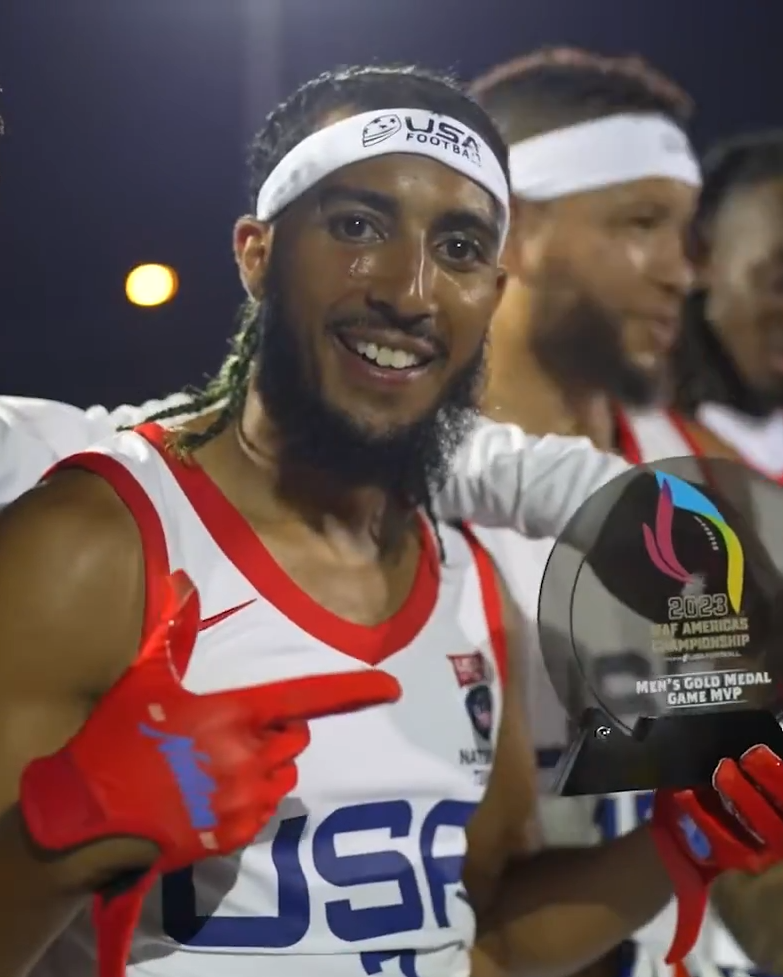
Darrell Doucette of Team USA was named the tournament's MVP

Team USA won all three of its games at the tournament, outscoring their opponents by a combined score of 106–44. Team USA quarterback Darrell Doucette was named the tournament MVP after completing all eight of his passes for 67 yards and three touchdowns, rushing six times for 76 yards and three touchdowns, and catching five passes for 79 yards. Team USA's other quarterback, Nico Casares, completed 24 of 27 passes for 332 yards, five touchdowns, and no interceptions.

Wildcats FFC quarterback Joe Burrow completed 30 of 41 passes for 196 yards, four touchdowns, and a pick-six, with co-captain Jayden Daniels throwing two touchdowns. Founders FFC quarterback Jalen Hurts completed 17 of 26 passes for 224 yards and two touchdowns while also rushing for one touchdown, catching one touchdown, and throwing a pick-six. The Founders' other quarterback, Tom Brady, completed eight of 12 passes for 85 yards and two touchdowns while also catching one pass for nine yards.

== Reaction ==
There was some surprise about how the relatively unknown Team USA flag football players were able to dominate teams composed of current and former NFL stars. The Athletic noted that the NFL players "struggled with the rules and with pulling flags." They also said that "Rugged defenders such as linebacker Luke Kuechly and Von Miller were helpless against America’s slithery playmakers." Kuechly said "Their skill set was very different than anything we’ve ever seen in the NFL. The speed, the quickness, the ability to create space — our inability to put our hands on those guys made the game very difficult."
