= IFAF Asia Flag Football Championship =

IFAF Asia Flag Football Championships
- Sport: Flag football
- Founded: 2015
- Folded: 2017
- No. of teams: 6–8
- Most titles: Thailand; Japan (1 each)

The IFAF Asia Flag Football Championship is an international flag football tournament for national teams of IFAF Asia. It was held two times in 2015 and 2017 which was won by Thailand and Japan respectively. The supposed first edition was scheduled to take place in 2014 in Kuwait but was not held.

The tournament served as the qualification tournament for Asian teams in the IFAF Flag Football World Championships.

It was replaced by the IFAF Asia-Oceania Flag Football Championships in 2023.

== Summary ==
Year	Host	Gold medal game			Bronze medal game			Ref.
Year	Host	Gold	Score	Silver	Bronze	Score	Fourth place	Ref.
2015	(Vietnam); Ho Chi Minh City	Thailand	27–20	Japan	South Korea	22–19	Philippines	
2017	(Philippines); Taguig	Japan	31–20	Thailand	South Korea	32–26	Philippines	

== 2015 edition ==
=== Preliminary round ===
==== Group A ====
Pos	Team	Pld	W	D	L	PF	PA	PD	Qualification	Philippines	South Korea	Malaysia	Vietnam
1	Philippines	3	3	0	0	101	19	+82	Semifinals	—	36–7	19–12	
2	South Korea	3	2	0	1	95	57	+38	Semifinals		—		
3	Malaysia	3	0	1	2	65	81	−16	5th–8th place		14–23	—	
4	Vietnam (H)	3	0	1	2	46	150	−104	5th–8th place	0–46	7–65	39–39	—

Source: RMIT Vietnam
(H) Hosts

==== Group B ====
Pos	Team	Pld	W	D	L	PF	PA	PD	Qualification	Japan	Thailand	Kuwait	Saudi Arabia
1	Japan	3	3	0	0	113	64	+49	Semifinals	—	34–33		
2	Thailand	3	2	0	1	132	83	+49	Semifinals		—		
3	Kuwait	3	1	0	2	93	84	+9	5th–8th place	24–25	31–41	—	
4	Saudi Arabia	3	0	0	3	43	150	−107	5th–8th place	7–54	18–58	18–38	—

Source: RMIT Vietnam

=== Placement matches ===
5th–8th place semifinals
A4	Vietnam	12
B3	Kuwait	48
B4	Saudi Arabia	26
A3	Malaysia	41

5th place
B3	Kuwait	29
A3	Malaysia	25
7th place
A4	Vietnam	6
B4	Saudi Arabia	47

=== Knock-out stage ===
Semifinals
B1	Japan	39
A2	South Korea	12
B2	Thailand	48
A1	Philippines	20

Finals
B1	Japan	20
B2	Thailand	27
Third place
A1	Philippines	19
A2	South Korea	22

== 2017 edition ==
=== Preliminary round ===
==== Group A ====
Pos	Team	Pld	W	D	L	PF	PA	PD	Qualification	Japan	South Korea	Kuwait
1	Japan	2	2	0	0	69	32	+37	Semifinals	—		28–25
2	South Korea	2	1	0	1	44	53	−9	Quarterfinals	7–41	—	
3	Kuwait	2	0	0	2	37	65	−28	Quarterfinals		12–37	—

Source: IFAF Asia

==== Group B ====
Pos	Team	Pld	W	D	L	PF	PA	PD	Qualification	Thailand	Philippines	Vietnam
1	Thailand	2	1	1	0	110	52	+58	Semifinals	—		71–13
2	Philippines (H)	2	1	1	0	97	51	+46	Quarterfinals	39–39	—	
3	Vietnam	2	0	0	2	25	129	−104	Quarterfinals		12–58	—

Source: IFAF Asia
(H) Hosts

=== Knock-out stage ===
Quarterfinals
B2	Philippines	33
A3	Kuwait	31
A2	South Korea	44
B3	Vietnam	0

Semifinals
A1	Japan	40
B2	Philippines	19
B1	Thailand	39
A2	South Korea	21

Finals
A1	Japan	39
B1	Thailand	21
Third place
B2	Philippines	26
A2	South Korea	32

=== Placement match ===
5th place
B3	Vietnam	7
A3	Kuwait	66

== Participating nations ==
Nation	(Vietnam) 2015	(Philippines) 2017	Years
Japan	2nd	1st	2
Malaysia	6th		1
Kuwait	5th	5th	2
Philippines	4th	4th	2
Saudi Arabia	7th		1
South Korea	3rd	3rd	2
Thailand	1st	2nd	2
Vietnam	8th	6th	2
Total	8	6	
