= 2023 IFAF Men's Asia-Oceania Flag Football Championship =

2023 IFAF Men's Asia Oceania Flag Football Championship
Tournament information
- Sport: Flag football
- Location: Shah Alam
- Dates: 27–29 October
- Host: Malaysia
- Venue: 1
- Teams: 11

Final positions
- Champions: Thailand
- Runner-up: New Zealand
- 3rd place: Japan

The 2023 IFAF Men's Asia Oceania Flag Football Championship is the inaugural edition of the IFAF Asia-Oceania Flag Football Championship, the continental tournament featuring national flag football teams from Asia and Oceania. It was held from 27 to 29 October 2023 at the EV Arena in Shah Alam, Malaysia.

Thailand is the inaugural champions.

== Preliminary round ==
=== Group A ===
Pos	Team	Pld	W	L	PF	PA	PD	Qualification	Japan	Australia	Kuwait	India	Philippines	Singapore
1	Japan	5	5	0	183	44	+139	SemifInals	—	20–12	46–13	45–13	37–6	35–0
2	Australia	5	4	1	180	58	+122	Quarterfinals	12–20	—	50–7	47–12	33–13	38–6
3	Kuwait	5	3	2	138	144	−6	Quarterfinals	13–46	7–50	—	42–24	43–6	33–18
4	India	5	1	4	100	181	−81	5th–8th place match	13–45	12–47	24–42	—	19–21	32–26
5	Philippines	5	1	4	59	146	−87	5th–8th place match	6–37	13–33	6–43	21–19	—	13–14
6	Singapore	5	1	4	64	151	−87	10th place match	0–35	6–38	18–33	26–32	14–13	—

Source: JAFA

=== Group B ===
Pos	Team	Pld	W	L	PF	PA	PD	Qualification	Thailand	New Zealand	Malaysia	Indonesia	South Korea
1	Thailand	4	3	1	141	107	+34	Semifinals	—	26–19	49–34	26–34	40–20
2	New Zealand	4	3	1	112	85	+27	Quarterfinals	19–26	—	27–20	32–26	34–13
3	Malaysia	4	2	2	120	117	+3	Quarterfinals	34–49	20–27	—	33–20	33–21
4	Indonesia	4	2	2	113	104	+9	5th–8th place match	34–26	26–32	20–33	—	33–13
5	South Korea	4	0	4	67	140	−73	5th–8th place match	20–40	13–34	21–33	13–33	—

Source: JAFA

== Playoffs ==
=== Classification ===
==== 5th–8th place ====
5th–8th place
A4	India	L
B5	South Korea	W
B4	Indonesia	W
A5	Philippines	L

Seventh place
B4	Indonesia	14
B5	South Korea	12
Fifth place
QF1	Kuwait	24
QF2	Malaysia	39

Source: IFAF, 2

==== 9th–11th place ====
9th–11th place		Tenth place
India	27
Philippines	33
Philippines	33	A6	Singapore	13
			India	12

=== Final ===
Top teams from each group received a bye to the semifinals while the next top two teams from each group advanced to the quarterfinals.

Quarterfinals
A3	Kuwait	26
B2	New Zealand	33
A2	Australia	33
B3	Malaysia	31

Semifinals
A1	Japan	33
B2	New Zealand	40
B2	Thailand	48
A2	Australia	21

Finals
A1	Thailand	31
B1	New Zealand	21
Third place
B2	Japan	38
A2	Australia	7

Source: IFAF, 2

== Standings ==
Rank	Team
1st place, gold medalist(s)	Thailand
2nd place, silver medalist(s)	New Zealand
3rd place, bronze medalist(s)	Japan
4	Australia
5	Malaysia
6	Kuwait
7	Indonesia
8	South Korea
9	Philippines
10	Singapore
11	India

Source: IFAF

== See also ==
- 2023 IFAF Women's Asia-Oceania Flag Football Championship
