= 2025 IFAF Men's Asia-Oceania Flag Football Championship =

Flag football tournament in Ningbo, China

2025 IFAF Men's Asia Oceania Flag Football Championship
Tournament information
- Sport: Flag football
- Location: Ningbo
- Dates: 24–26 October
- Host: China
- Venue: 1
- Teams: 14

Final positions
- Champions: Australia
- Runner-up: Japan
- 3rd place: American Samoa

The 2025 IFAF Men's Asia-Oceania Flag Football Championship is the second edition of the IFAF Asia-Oceania Flag Football Championships, the continental tournament featuring national teams from IFAF Asia and IFAF Oceania. It will be held from 24 to 26 October, 2025 in Ningbo, China. The top three teams will qualify for the 2026 IFAF Men's Flag Football World Championship in Düsseldorf, Germany.

== Host selection ==
China was awarded the hosting rights for the tournament on July 24, 2025. The Asia Oceania tournament will be the second flag football tournament China will host after the women's flag football event at the 2025 World Games. The championships will mark China's first time of hosting a major International Federation of American Football (IFAF) event.

== Draw ==
Pool A	Pool B	Pool C	Pool D	Pool E
Japan	Kuwait	South Korea	Singapore	New Zealand
Philippines	India	Indonesia	Thailand	Australia
Hong Kong	China	Mongolia (Note: Mongolia withdrew after the draw due to funding issues.)	Jordan	American Samoa

== Group stage ==
=== Asia tournament ===
==== Group A ====
Pos	Team	Pld	W	L	PF	PA	PD	Qualification	Japan	Philippines	Hong Kong
1	Japan	2	2	0	92	45	+47	Quarterfinals	—	45–25	47–20
2	Philippines	2	1	1	64	64	0	Quarterfinals	—	—	39–19
3	Hong Kong	2	0	2	39	86	−47	9th–11th consolation round	—	—	—

Source: IFAF

==== Group B ====
Pos	Team	Pld	W	L	PF	PA	PD	Qualification	People's Republic of China	Kuwait	India
1	China (H)	2	2	0	76	18	+58	Quarterfinals	—	33–12	43–6
2	Kuwait	2	1	1	43	45	−2	Quarterfinals	—	—	31–12
3	India	2	0	2	18	74	−56	9th–11th consolation round	—	—	—

Source: IFAF
(H) Hosts

==== Group C ====
Pos	Team	Pld	W	L	PF	PA	PD	Qualification	Indonesia	South Korea	Mongolia
1	Indonesia	2	2	0	68	20	+48	Quarterfinals	—	48–7	—
2	South Korea	2	0	2	20	68	−48	Quarterfinals	13–20	—	—
3	Mongolia	0	0	0	0	0	0	Withdrew	—	—	—

Source: IFAF

==== Group D ====
Pos	Team	Pld	W	L	PF	PA	PD	Qualification	Thailand	Singapore	Jordan
1	Thailand	2	2	0	83	0	+83	Quarterfinals	—	33–0	50–0
2	Singapore	2	1	1	44	66	−22	Quarterfinals	—	—	44–33
3	Jordan	2	0	2	33	94	−61	9th–11th consolation round	—	—	—

Source: IFAF

=== Oceania tournament ===
==== Group E ====
Pos	Team	Pld	W	L	PF	PA	PD	Qualification	Australia	American Samoa	New Zealand
1	Australia	4	4	0	167	80	+87	Asia-Oceania final and 2026 World Championship	—	41–12	57–25
2	American Samoa	4	2	2	109	132	−23	Asia-Oceania third place playoff	18–24	—	40–35
3	New Zealand	4	0	4	117	181	−64		25–45	32–39	—

Source: IFAF

== Final round ==
=== Asia bracket ===
Placement (Fifth place)
B2	Kuwait	12
A2	Philippines	26
Placement (Seventh place)
C2	South Korea	14
D2	Singapore	19

Consolation (5th–8th)
B2	Kuwait	40
C2	South Korea	31
A2	Philippines	41
D2	Singapore	19

Quarterfinals
A1	Japan	41
B2	Kuwait	13
D1	Thailand	41
C2	South Korea	7
B1	China	41
A2	Philippines	29
C1	Indonesia	41
D2	Singapore	12

Semifinals
A1	Japan	37
D1	Thailand	34
B1	China	36
C1	Indonesia	14

Asia final
A1	Japan	40
B1	China	39
Asia bronze medal game
D1	Thailand	32
C1	Indonesia	20

Source: IFAF 1, 2

=== Asia Oceania bracket ===
Asia final
A1	Japan	40
B1	China	39

Asia Oceania final
A1	Japan	19
E1	Australia	23
Asia Oceania third place
B1	China	34
E2	American Samoa	41

Source: IFAF 1, 2

==== Consolation round ====
Pos	Team	Pld	W	L	PF	PA	PD	Hong Kong	Jordan	India
1	Hong Kong	2	2	0	73	31	+42	—	39–8	34–23
2	Jordan	2	1	1	42	51	−9	—	—	34–12
3	India	2	0	2	35	68	−33	—	—	—

Source: IFAF

== Standings ==
Asia		Oceania		Asia-Oceania	
Rank	Team	Rank	Team	Rank	Team
1	Japan	1	Australia	1st place, gold medalist(s)	Australia
2	China	2	American Samoa	2nd place, silver medalist(s)	Japan
3	Thailand	3	New Zealand	3rd place, bronze medalist(s)	American Samoa
4	Indonesia			4	China
5	Philippines				
6	Kuwait				
7	Singapore				
8	South Korea				
9	Hong Kong				
10	Jordan				
11	India				
WD	Mongolia				

Source: IFAF

== See also ==
- 2025 IFAF Women's Asia-Oceania Flag Football Championship
