= Mexico men's national flag football team =

Mexico

National team information
- Federation: Federación Mexicana de Fútbol Americano
- IFAF continental area: Americas

Personnel
- Head coach: Fernando Alfaro

Championships
- Americas championships: 1: 2025

The Mexico men's national flag football team represents Mexico in men's international flag football competitions. The team is governed by the Federación Mexicana de Fútbol Americano. As of 2025, the International Federation of American Football (IFAF) rank the Mexico men's team 3rd worldwide.

Mexico has won three medals at the IFAF Flag Football World Championship, including two silver medals in 2014 and 2021. The team also won a bronze medal at the 2022 World Games and a gold medal at the 2025 IFAF Americas Continental Flag Football Championship.

== Competitive record ==
Champions Runners-up Third place Fourth place

=== IFAF World Championship ===
IFAF Flag Football World Championship
Year	Result	Pos	Pld	W	D	L	PF	PA
(Austria) 2002	Did not participate							
(France) 2004	Did not participate							
(South Korea) 2006	Did not participate							
(Canada) 2008								
(Canada) 2010	Seventh place	7th						
(Sweden) 2012	Fourth place	4th						
(Italy) 2014	Runners-up	2nd						
(United States) 2016	Third place	3rd						
(Panama) 2018	Fourth place	4th						
(Israel) 2021	Runners-up	2nd	8	7	0	1		
(Finland) 2024	Fourth place	4th	7	5	0	2		
(Germany) 2026	Fourth place	4th	6	4	0	2		

=== IFFF World Cup of Flag Football ===
IFFF World Cup of Flag Football
Year	Result	Pos	Pld	W	D	L	PF	PA	Ref.
(Mexico) 2000	Fourth place	4th	4	1	0	3	31	85	
(United States) 2001	Did not participate								
(United States) 2002	Third place	3rd	6	3	0	3	66	114	
(The Bahamas) 2003	Runners-up	2nd	5	4	0	1	65	28	
(Dominican Republic) 2004	Did not participate								
(United States) 2005	Fifth place	5th	3	0	0	3	12	33	
(United States) 2006	Champions	1st	4	3	0	1	45	44	
(United States) 2007	Runners-up	2nd	2	1	0	1	18	20	
(Costa Rica) 2008	Third place	3rd							
(United States) 2009	Runners-up	2nd							

=== World Games ===
World Games
Year	Result	Pos	Pld	W	D	L	PF	PA	Ref.
(United States) 2022	Runners-up	2nd	6	3	0	3	180	166	

=== IFAF Americas Continental Championship ===
IFAF Americas Continental Flag Football Championship
Year	Result	Pos	Pld	W	D	L	PF	PA	Ref.
(United States) 2023	Runners-up	2nd	7	5	0	2	268	180	
(Panama) 2025	Champions (Note: The final was cancelled due to inclement weather and the finalists United States and Mexico were declared joint champions.)	1st	6	6	0	0	299	110	

== World Games ==
=== 2022 ===
Flag football made its debut in the multi-disciplinary sports event World Games for 2022 edition that was held in Birmingham, Alabama. The tournament was hosted at Birmingham's Legion Field and was held from July 10 to 14.

Mexico went 1–2 in pool play. They defeated Denmark in the quarterfinals and lost to Italy in the semifinals, before defeating Austria 39–35 in the bronze medal game.

== Roster ==
IFAF World Flagg 2026:

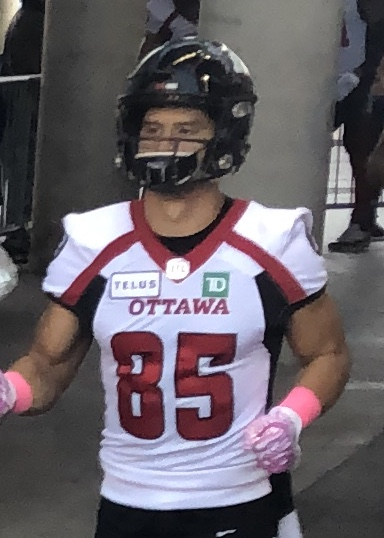
Guillermo Villalobos, seen with the CFL team Ottawa Redblacks in 2019

Men's National Flag Football
#	Name	Position
1	Diego Rodolfo Pérez Arvizu	Quarteback
3	Damián Chirinos Ruiz	Wide receiver
4	Santiago "Drago" Judah Medina Sánchez	Wide receiver
10	Victor "Cheetos" Emmanuel Balderramos Sánchez	Quarteback/Wide receiver
12	Christopher "Chris" Bryan Cardona Padrón	Wide receiver
14	Luis Alberto Villegas González	Center/Wide receiver
19	Guillermo Alberto Villalobos Zanabria	Wide receiver
21	Javier Alberto Vivian Quintero	Defensive back
23	Ramón Alonso Gaxiola Muñíz	Defensive back
24	Ángel Demián Valdéz Ortega	Blitzer
26	Santiago Vargas Rodríguez	Defensive back
28	Luis Eduardo Jaramillo Mosqueda	Defensive back

Head Coach:

- Fernando Alfaro Espinoza (Head coach)

Assistant Coach:

- Fernando Nahara Sosa (Assistant)
- Rodrigo Romero Colchado (Defensive coordinator)
- María Eugenia Huerta Castañeda (Ofensive coordinator)
- Ricardo Corona Placeres (Defensive assistant)
- Rodrigo Arista Dávila (Ofensive assistant)

== See also ==
- Mexico women's national flag football team
