= Dezmin Lewis =

American football player (born 1992)

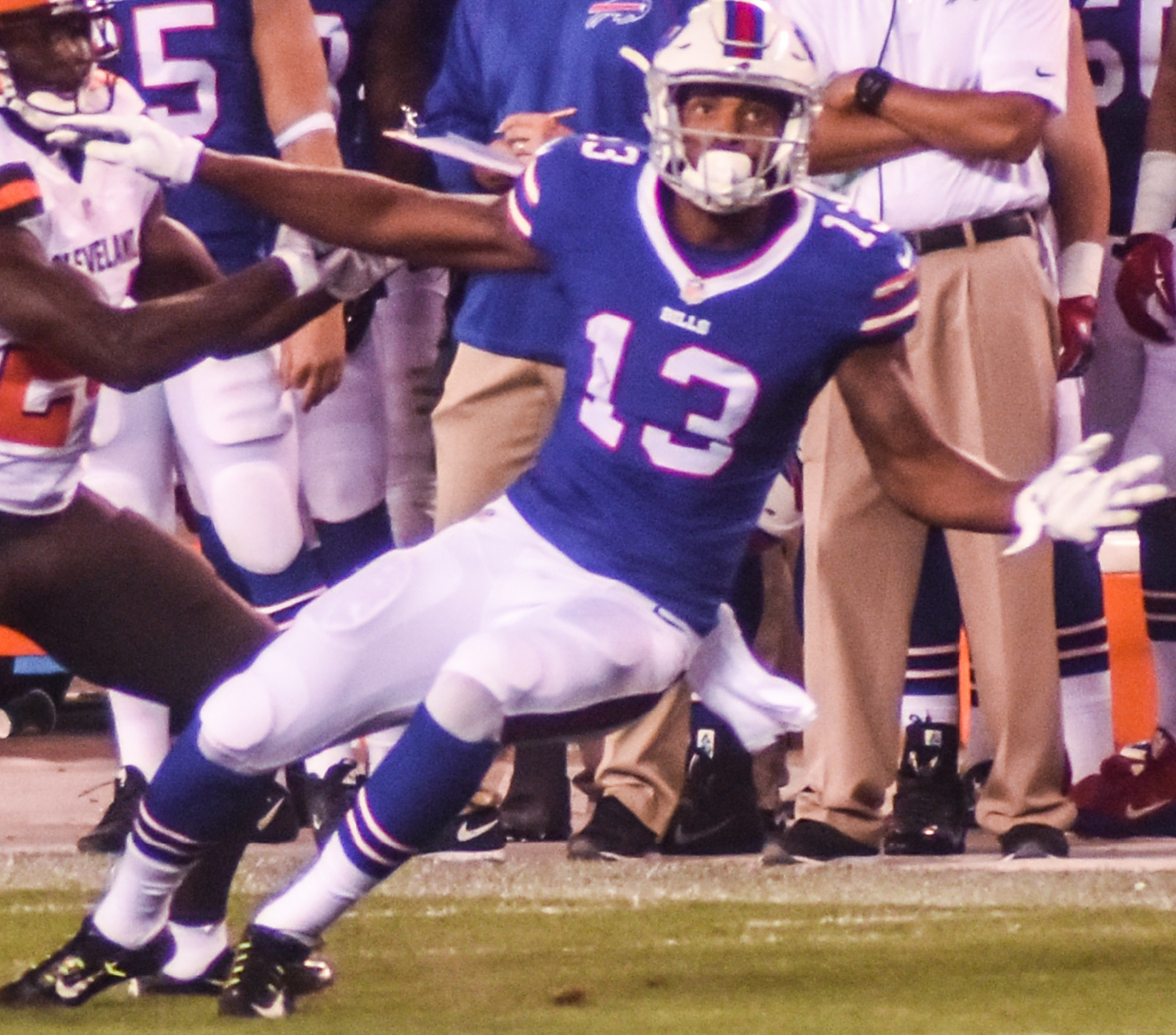
- Lewis with the Buffalo Bills in 2015

No. 13
- Position: Wide receiver

Personal information
- Born: December 5, 1992 (age 33); Mesquite, Texas, U.S.
- Listed height: 6 ft 4 in (1.93 m)
- Listed weight: 214 lb (97 kg)

Career information
- High school: North Mesquite
- College: Central Arkansas
- NFL draft: 2015: 7th round, 234th overall pick

Career history
- Buffalo Bills (2015–2016)

Awards and highlights
- First-team All-Southland (2014); Second-team All-Southland (2013)
- Stats at Pro Football Reference

Dezmin Lewis
Medal record

Representing United States

Men's Flag football

World Games
Gold medal – first place	2022 Birmingham	Team competition

Dezmin "Dez" Lewis (born December 5, 1992) is an American former professional football player who was a wide receiver for the Buffalo Bills of the National Football League (NFL). He played college football for the Central Arkansas Bears and was selected by the Bills in the seventh round of the 2015 NFL draft.

== College career ==
Lewis played at the University of Central Arkansas from 2011 to 2014. He had 197 receptions for 2,668 yards and 24 touchdowns during his career with the Bears.

== Professional career ==
Lewis was selected by the Buffalo Bills in the seventh round with the 234th overall pick of the 2015 NFL draft. On September 4, 2015, he was released by the Bills. On September 6, 2015, the Bills signed Lewis to their practice squad.

On September 2, 2016, Lewis was released by the Bills as part of final roster cuts and was signed to their practice squad. He was promoted to the active roster on November 29, 2016.

On September 2, 2017, Lewis was waived by the Bills.

== International competition ==
Lewis represented the United States at the 2022 World Games, playing on the U.S. flag football team where he won a gold medal.
