= Guillermo Villalobos =

Guillermo Villalobos may refer to:

- Guillermo Villalobos (gridiron football) (born 1991), Mexican gridiron football wide receiver
- Guillermo Villalobos (footballer) (born 2001), Costa Rican association football centre-back
