= 2024 IFAF Men's Flag Football World Championship =

Tournament information
- Sport: Flag football
- Location: Lahti
- Dates: 27 August–30 August
- Host: Finland
- Venue: 2
- Teams: 32

Final positions
- Champions: United States (6th title)
- Runner-up: Austria
- 3rd place: Switzerland

The 2024 IFAF Men's Flag Football World Championship was the 11th World Championships in men's flag football. The tournament took place in Lahti, Finland, from 27 to 30 August 2024.

The United States won their fifth consecutive and overall sixth title, after they defeated Austria 53–21 in the final.

== Venues ==
The championship utilised 2 venues: the Pajulahti Sports Institute for all group matches, and the Lahti Sports Center for play-offs and placement matches.

== Tournament groups ==
After the group ballot, 32 teams were divided into eight groups of 4. In the group stage each team played each other once, while the second stage of the event included play-offs and placement matches.

The two best teams of each group advanced to the round of 16.

Group A	Group B	Group C	Group D	Group E	Group F	Group G	Group H
United States; Spain; Brazil; Serbia	Mexico; Australia; Chile; Cameroon	Germany; Great Britain; Sweden; Georgia	Austria; Switzerland; Ukraine; Poland	Italy; Canada; Finland; Singapore	Panama; New Zealand; Czech Republic; South Korea	Israel; Denmark; Ireland; India	Japan; France; Kuwait; Argentina

== Results ==
=== Preliminary round ===
==== Group A ====
Pos	Team	Pld	W	L	PF	PA	PD	Qualification	United States	Spain	Brazil	Serbia
1	United States	3	3	0	158	45	+113	Round of 16	—	57–25	52–6	49–14
2	Spain	3	2	1	102	100	+2	Round of 16	25–57	—	32–19	45–24
3	Brazil	3	1	2	51	103	−52		6–52	19–32	—	26–19
4	Serbia	3	0	3	57	120	−63		14–49	24–45	19–26	—

Updated to match(es) played on 28th August 2024. Source: https://app.sportapp.fi/series/2024/1/2024-flagwc-men

==== Group B ====
Pos	Team	Pld	W	L	PF	PA	PD	Qualification	Mexico	Australia	Chile	Cameroon
1	Mexico	3	3	0	188	39	+149	Round of 16	—	50–27	66–6	72–6
2	Australia	3	2	1	128	58	+70	Round of 16	27–50	—	33–8	68–0
3	Chile	3	1	2	50	99	−49		6–66	8–33	—	36–0
4	Cameroon	3	0	3	6	176	−170		6–72	0–68	0–36	—

Updated to match(es) played on 28th August 2024. Source: https://app.sportapp.fi/series/2024/1/2024-flagwc-men

==== Group C ====
Pos	Team	Pld	W	L	PF	PA	PD	Qualification	United Kingdom	Germany	Sweden	Georgia
1	Great Britain	3	3	0	114	58	+56	Round of 16	—	34–20	32–26	48–12
2	Germany	3	2	1	122	59	+63	Round of 16	20–34	—	42–25	60–0
3	Sweden	3	1	2	103	92	+11		26–32	25–42	—	52–18
4	Georgia	3	0	3	30	160	−130		12–48	0–60	18–52	—

Updated to match(es) played on 28th August 2024. Source: https://app.sportapp.fi/series/2024/1/2024-flagwc-men

==== Group D ====
Pos	Team	Pld	W	L	PF	PA	PD	Qualification	Austria	Switzerland	Ukraine	Poland
1	Austria	3	3	0	113	38	+75	Round of 16	—	24–12	49–12	40–14
2	Switzerland	3	2	1	100	70	+30	Round of 16	12–24	—	33–26	55–20
3	Ukraine	3	1	2	64	100	−36		12–49	26–33	—	26–18
4	Poland	3	0	3	52	121	−69		14–40	20–55	18–26	—

Updated to match(es) played on 28th August 2024. Source: https://app.sportapp.fi/series/2024/1/2024-flagwc-men

==== Group E ====
Pos	Team	Pld	W	L	PF	PA	PD	Qualification	Italy	Canada	Finland	Singapore
1	Italy	3	2	1	145	67	+78	Round of 16	—	33–34	50–27	62–6
2	Canada	3	2	1	115	61	+54	Round of 16	34–33	—	26–28	55–0
3	Finland	3	2	1	90	89	+1		27–50	28–26	—	35–13
4	Singapore	3	0	3	19	152	−133		6–62	0–55	13–35	—

Updated to match(es) played on 28th August 2024. Source: https://app.sportapp.fi/series/2024/1/2024-flagwc-men

==== Group F ====
Pos	Team	Pld	W	L	PF	PA	PD	Qualification	Panama	Czech Republic	New Zealand	South Korea
1	Panama	3	3	0	127	39	+88	Round of 16	—	46–7	33–19	48–13
2	Czech Republic	3	1	2	72	97	−25	Round of 16	7–46	—	41–26	24–25
3	New Zealand	3	1	2	78	100	−22		19–33	26–41	—	33–26
4	South Korea	3	1	2	64	105	−41		13–48	25–24	26–33	—

Updated to match(es) played on 28th August 2024. Source: https://app.sportapp.fi/series/2024/1/2024-flagwc-men
- Czech Republic advanced to Round of 16 due to head-to-head victory vs. New Zealand.

==== Group G ====
Pos	Team	Pld	W	L	PF	PA	PD	Qualification	Israel	Denmark	Ireland	India
1	Israel	2	2	0	106	57	+49	Round of 16	—	60–29	46–28	—
2	Denmark	2	1	1	51	74	−23	Round of 16	60–29	—	22–14	—
3	Ireland	2	0	2	42	68	−26		28–46	14–22	—	—
4	India	0	0	0	0	0	0	Withdrew	—	—	—	—

Updated to match(es) played on 28th August 2024. Source: https://app.sportapp.fi/series/2024/1/2024-flagwc-men

==== Group H ====
Pos	Team	Pld	W	L	PF	PA	PD	Qualification	Japan	France	Argentina	Kuwait
1	Japan	3	3	0	112	50	+62	Round of 16	—	27–25	42–7	43–18
2	France	3	2	1	122	39	+83	Round of 16	25–27	—	40–6	57–6
3	Argentina	3	1	2	48	101	−53		7–42	6–40	—	35–19
4	Kuwait	3	0	3	43	135	−92		18–43	6–57	19–35	—

Updated to match(es) played on 28th August 2024. Source: https://app.sportapp.fi/series/2024/1/2024-flagwc-men

=== Championship round ===
Round of 16
United States	68
Czech Republic	18
Italy	48
Germany	26
Panama	38
Switzerland	45
Israel	38
Canada	46
Mexico	42
Spain	31
Great Britain	36
France	37
Austria	28
Australia	26
Japan	19
Denmark	20

Quarter-finals
United States	46
Italy	21
Switzerland	27
Canada	21
Mexico	30
France	20
Austria	29
Denmark	24

Semi-finals
United States	45
Switzerland	6
Mexico	32
Austria	36

Final
United States	53
Austria	21
Third place
Switzerland	41
Mexico	35

== Final ranking ==
Rank	Team
1st place, gold medalist(s)	United States
2nd place, silver medalist(s)	Austria
3rd place, bronze medalist(s)	Switzerland
4	Mexico
5	France
6	Italy
7	Canada
8	Denmark
9	Israel
10	Great Britain
11	Japan
12	Germany
13	Panama
14	Spain
15	Australia
16	Czech Republic
17	Serbia
18	Sweden
19	New Zealand
20	South Korea
21	Ireland
22	Finland
23	Ukraine
24	Chile
25	Brazil
26	Poland
27	Argentina
28	Singapore
29	Kuwait
30	Georgia
31	Cameroon

== See also ==
- 2024 IFAF Women's Flag Football World Championship
