= 2021 IFAF Men's Flag Football World Championship =

2021 IFAF Men's Flag Football World Championships

Tournament information
- Sport: Flag football
- Location: Jerusalem
- Dates: 6 December–8 December
- Host: Israel
- Teams: 21

Final positions
- Champions: United States (5th title)
- Runner-up: Mexico
- 3rd place: Panama

The 2021 IFAF Men's Flag Football World Championships was the 10th World Championships in men's flag football. The tournament took place in Jerusalem, Israel, from 6 to 8 December 2021. The top seven teams, not including the United States, qualified for the 2022 World Games.

== Venue ==
Denmark was scheduled to host the 2020 edition only for it to be canceled due to the coronavirus pandemic.

The International Federation of American Football (IFAF) selected Israel to host the Flag Football World Championships for 2021. The Kraft Family Sports Campus in Jerusalem was originally scheduled to stage the men's and women's events, but due to expected high winds the games were played at Teddy Stadium.

== Tournament groups ==
After the group ballot, 21 teams were divided into three groups of 5 and one group of 6. In the group stage each team played each other once, while the second stage of the event included play-offs and placement matches.

The two best teams of each group advanced to the quarter-finals.

Group A	Group B	Group C	Group D
France; United States; Spain; India; Chile	Team Neutral; Austria; Belarus; South Korea; Panama	Japan; Italy; Switzerland; Brazil; Denmark	Israel (hosts); Germany; Slovakia; Finland; Mexico; Thailand

- Russia participated as "Team Neutral" following a decision of the Court of Arbitration for Sport decision in the Russian Anti-Doping Agency case.

== Results ==
=== Preliminary round ===
==== Group A ====
Pos	Team	Pld	W	L	PF	PA	PD	Qualification	United States	France	Spain	Chile	India
1	United States	4	4	0	249	60	+189	Quarterfinals	—	57–32	54–28	76–0	62–0
2	France	4	3	1	177	96	+81	Quarterfinals	32–57	—	53–33	20–0	72–6
3	Spain	4	2	2	158	113	+45	9th-12th place	28–54	33–53	—	43–0	54–6
4	Chile	4	1	3	32	153	−121	13th-16th place	0–76	0–20	0–43	—	32–14
5	India	4	0	4	26	220	−194	17th-20th place	0–62	6–72	6–54	14–32	—

Source: Official website

==== Group B ====
Pos	Team	Pld	W	L	PF	PA	PD	Qualification	Panama	Austria		South Korea	Belarus
1	Panama	4	4	0	201	32	+169	Quarterfinals	—	32–14	56–6	50–6	63–6
2	Austria	4	3	1	102	44	+58	Quarterfinals	14–32	—	14–0	34–6	40–6
3	Team Neutral	4	2	2	88	115	−27	9th-12th place	6–56	0–14	—	36–26	46–19
4	South Korea	4	1	3	80	132	−52	13th-16th place	6–50	6–34	26–36	—	42–12
5	Belarus	4	0	4	43	191	−148	17th-20th place	6–63	6–40	19–46	12–42	—

Source: Official website

==== Group C ====
Pos	Team	Pld	W	L	PF	PA	PD	Qualification	Italy	Denmark	Japan	Switzerland	Brazil
1	Italy	4	4	0	185	121	+64	Quarterfinals	—	48–38	41–35	48–27	48–21
2	Denmark	4	3	1	149	76	+73	Quarterfinals	38–48	—	39–6	40–22	32–0
3	Japan	4	2	2	107	107	0	9th-12th place	35–41	6–39	—	23–12	43–15
4	Switzerland	4	1	3	98	124	−26	13th-16th place	27–48	22–40	12–23	—	37–13
5	Brazil	4	0	4	49	160	−111	17th-20th place	21–48	0–32	15–43	13–37	—

Source: Official website

==== Group D ====
Pos	Team	Pld	W	L	PF	PA	PD	Qualification	Mexico	Germany	Israel	Thailand	Finland	Slovakia
1	Mexico	5	5	0	234	134	+100	Quarterfinals	—	44–34	48–41	40–25	48–20	54–14
2	Germany	5	4	1	188	124	+64	Quarterfinals	34–44	—	52–41	34–12	27–25	41–2
3	Israel (H)	5	3	2	247	125	+122	9th-12th place	41–48	41–52	—	48–13	61–12	56–0
4	Thailand	5	2	3	146	153	−7	13th-16th place	25–40	12–34	13–48	—	40–19	56–12
5	Finland	5	1	4	124	182	−58	17th-20th place	20–48	25–27	12–61	19–40	—	48–6
6	Slovakia	5	0	5	34	255	−221	21st place	14–54	2–41	0–56	12–56	6–48	—

Source: Official website
(H) Hosts

=== Knock-out stage ===
Quarter-finals
7 December
United States	64
Germany	18
7 December
Panama	39
Denmark	33
7 December
France	28
Mexico	48
7 December
Austria	24
Italy	27

Semi-finals
8 December
United States	35
Panama	6
8 December
Mexico	36
Italy	35

Final
8 December
United States	44
Mexico	41
3rd place
8 December
Panama	45
Italy	40

=== Placement matches ===
==== 5th place bracket ====
5th–8th place semi-finals
7 December
Germany	20
Austria	28
7 December
Denmark	27
France	37

5th place
7 December
Austria	31
France	37
7th place
7 December
Germany	31
Denmark	37

==== 9th place bracket ====
9th-11th place semi-finals
7 December
Spain	26
Japan	25
7 December
Team Neutral	27
Israel	43

9th place
7 December
Spain	19
Israel	59
11th place
7 December
Japan	52
Team Neutral	19

==== 13th place bracket ====
13th-16th place semi-finals
7 December
Chile	6
Switzerland	47
7 December
South Korea	21
Thailand	33

13th place
7 December
Switzerland	27
Thailand	39
15th place
7 December
Chile	0
South Korea	20

==== 17th place bracket ====
17th-20th place semi-finals
7 December
India	0
Brazil	62
7 December
Belarus	12
Finland	57

17th place
7 December
Brazil	33
Finland	27
19th place
7 December
India	6
Belarus	32

== Ranking and statistics ==
=== Final ranking ===
Rank	Team
Gold medal	United States
Silver medal	Mexico
Bronze medal	Panama
4	Italy
5	France
6	Austria
7	Denmark
8	Germany
9	Israel
10	Spain
11	Japan
12	Team Neutral
13	Thailand
14	Switzerland
15	South Korea
16	Chile
17	Brazil
18	Finland
19	Belarus
20	India
21	Slovakia
