= 2025 IFAF Men's European Flag Football Championship =

11th Men's European Flag Football Championship

Tournament details
- Host nation: France
- Dates: September 24, 2025 – September 27, 2025
- No. of nations: 24
- Champions: Italy
- Runner-up: Austria
- Third-place: France

The 2025 European Flag Football Championship was the 11th Men's European Flag Football Championship. It was played between September 24 to September 27 at the Val-de-Marne Interdepartmental Sports Park, France.

Italy won its first Men's title after four previous runner up finishes, defeating Austria in the final by a score of 27-19

== Tournament Groups ==
The 24 Men's national teams were divided into 4 groups of 6, based on the then world rankings. The top two teams from each group will qualify for the knockout stage, while the remaining teams will play for their final ranking placement based on the results from the group stage.

Group A	Group B	Group C	Group D
Austria; Great Britain; Spain; Georgia; Netherlands; Croatia	Germany; Denmark; Finland; Poland; Belgium; Slovenia	France; Israel; Sweden; Czech Republic; Slovakia; Hungary	Italy; Switzerland; Ukraine; Ireland; Norway; Portugal

== Results ==
=== Group Stage ===
==== Group A ====
Pos	Team	Pld	W	L	PF	PA	PD	Qualification	Austria	United Kingdom	Spain	Netherlands	Croatia	Georgia
1	Austria	5	5	0	207	80	+127	Knockout Stage	—	33–31	38–31	38–0	36–0	62–18
2	Great Britain	5	4	1	182	85	+97	Knockout Stage	31–33	—	27–26	40–7	39–6	45–13
3	Spain	5	3	2	200	107	+93		31–38	26–27	—	42–12	45–13	56–17
4	Netherlands	5	2	3	69	159	−90		0–38	7–40	12–42	—	24–14	26–25
5	Croatia	5	1	4	67	144	−77		0–36	6–39	13–45	14–24	—	34–0
6	Georgia	5	0	5	73	223	−150		18–62	13–45	17–56	25–26	0–34	—

Updated to match(es) played on 27th September 2025. Source: https://web.archive.org/web/20251014042452/https://euroflag2025.com/en/live-scores/

==== Group B ====
Pos	Team	Pld	W	L	PF	PA	PD	Qualification	Denmark	Slovenia	Germany	Finland	Poland	Belgium
1	Denmark	5	5	0	195	76	+119	Knockout Stage	—	34–19	33–32	27–12	45–6	56–7
2	Slovenia	5	4	1	176	136	+40	Knockout Stage	19–34	—	36–30	34–33	26–20	61–19
3	Germany	5	3	2	217	120	+97		32–33	30–36	—	40–26	62–18	53–7
4	Finland	5	2	3	141	134	+7		12–27	33–34	26–40	—	30–21	40–12
5	Poland	5	1	4	104	193	−89		6–45	20–26	18–62	21–30	—	39–30
6	Belgium	5	0	5	75	249	−174		7–56	19–61	7–53	12–40	30–39	—

Updated to match(es) played on 27th September 2025. Source: https://web.archive.org/web/20251014042452/https://euroflag2025.com/en/live-scores/

==== Group C ====
Pos	Team	Pld	W	L	PF	PA	PD	Qualification	Israel	France	Czech Republic	Hungary	Sweden	Slovakia
1	Israel	5	5	0	288	105	+183	Knockout Stage	—	52–46	62–20	58–27	50–6	66–6
2	France	5	4	1	235	118	+117	Knockout Stage	46–52	—	57–35	40–6	58–12	34–13
3	Czech Republic	5	2	3	176	199	−23		20–62	35–57	—	45–6	37–41	39–33
4	Hungary	5	2	3	89	181	−92		27–58	6–40	6–45	—	26–18	24–20
5	Sweden	5	2	3	131	184	−53		6–50	12–58	41–37	18–26	—	54–13
6	Slovakia	5	0	5	85	217	−132		6–66	13–34	33–39	20–24	13–54	—

Updated to match(es) played on 27th September 2025. Source: https://web.archive.org/web/20251014042452/https://euroflag2025.com/en/live-scores/

==== Group D ====
Pos	Team	Pld	W	L	PF	PA	PD	Qualification	Switzerland	Italy	Ireland	Ukraine	Portugal	Norway
1	Switzerland	5	5	0	210	88	+122	Knockout Stage	—	32–30	46–34	36–0	40–12	56–12
2	Italy	5	4	1	186	69	+117	Knockout Stage	30–32	—	41–12	39–13	43–12	33–0
3	Ireland	5	3	2	161	155	+6		34–46	12–41	—	49–20	19–14	47–34
4	Ukraine	5	2	3	77	156	−79		0–36	13–39	20–49	—	26–19	18–13
5	Portugal	5	1	4	105	141	−36		12–40	12–43	14–19	19–26	—	48–13
6	Norway	5	0	5	72	202	−130		12–56	0–33	34–47	13–18	13–48	—

Updated to match(es) played on 27th September 2025. Source: https://web.archive.org/web/20251014042452/https://euroflag2025.com/en/live-scores/

=== Knockout Stage ===
Quarterfinals
Austria	42
Slovenia	19
France	42
Switzerland	36
Israel	38
Italy	41
Great Britain	32
Denmark	19

Semifinals
Austria	43
France	35
Italy	28
Great Britain	22

Finals
Austria	19
Italy	27
Third place
France	34
Great Britain	20

=== Ranking Stage ===
==== 5th-8th Place Bracket ====
Semifinals
Slovenia	19
Switzerland	42
Denmark	40
Israel	41

Fifth place
Switzerland	26
Israel	35
Seventh place
Slovenia	1
Denmark	0

Denmark forfeited the seventh place game due to player injury.

==== 9th-16th Placement Brackets ====
Quarterfinals
Ireland	41
Hungary	0
Spain	46
Finland	7
Germany	46
Netherlands	0
Czech Republic	28
Ukraine	6

Semifinals
Ireland	26
Spain	40
Germany	49
Czech Republic	34

Ninth place
Spain	20
Germany	34
Eleventh place
Ireland	21
Czech Republic	12

Semifinals
Netherlands	18
Ukraine	19
Finland	33
Hungary	26

Thirteenth place
Ukraine	31
Finland	19
Fifteenth place
Hungary	33
Netherlands	25

==== 17th-24th Placement Brackets ====
Quarterfinals
Portugal	34
Slovakia	14
Croatia	44
Belgium	13
Sweden	27
Norway	24
Poland	32
Georgia	25

Semifinals
Portugal	21
Croatia	32
Sweden	43
Poland	18

Seventeenth place
Croatia	12
Sweden	46
Nineteenth place
Portugal	25
Poland	7

Semifinals
Slovakia	33
Belgium	22
Norway	21
Georgia	12

Twenty-first place
Slovakia	41
Norway	34
Twenty-third place
Belgium	33
Georgia	24

== Final Ranking ==
Gold medal	Italy
Silver medal	Austria
Bronze medal	France
4	Great Britain
5	Israel
6	Switzerland
7	Slovenia
8	Denmark
9	Germany
10	Spain
11	Ireland
12	Czech Republic
13	Ukraine
14	Finland
15	Hungary
16	Netherlands
17	Sweden
18	Croatia
19	Portugal
20	Poland
21	Slovakia
22	Norway
23	Belgium
24	Georgia

== See also ==
- 2025 IFAF Women's European Flag Football Championship
