= 2025 IFAF Americas Continental Men's Flag Football Championship =

International flag football competition

- 2025

Tournament information
- Sport: Flag football
- Location: Penonomé
- Dates: 12 September–14 September
- Host: Panama
- Venue: 1
- Teams: 11

Final positions
- Champions: United States(2nd title), Mexico(1st title)
- 3rd place: Canada

The 2025 International Federation of American Football (IFAF) Americas Continental Men's Flag Football Championship was held from September 12–14 at the Estadio Virgilio Tejeira at Penonomé. The championship brings together the best men’s flag football national teams from North and South America.

Was the second Americas Continental Championship taking place this year as IFAF embarks on its biggest-ever cycle of global flag football competition in the run up to the 2026 IFAF Men's Flag Football World Championship in Düsseldorf, Germany.

The Continental Championship served as a qualifying pathway for the first time, with the reinforced global competitions structure reflecting flag football's momentum as one of the world's fastest-growing sports.

== Results ==
=== Preliminary round ===
==== Group A ====
Pos	Team	Pld	W	L	PF	PA	PD	United States	Canada	Brazil	Guatemala	Colombia
1	United States	4	4	0	226	173	+53	—	54–26	44–07	66–07	62–13
2	Canada	4	3	1	136	87	+49	26–54	—	32–13	34–06	44–14
3	Brazil	4	2	2	93	101	−8	07–44	13–32	—	46–07	27–18
4	Guatemala	4	1	3	52	160	−108	07–66		07–46	—	32–14
5	Colombia	4	0	4	59	165	−106	13–62	14–44	18–27	14–32	—

Updated to match(es) played on 13th September 2025. Source: https://affpanama.org/calendario_ffcc/

==== Group B ====
Pos	Team	Pld	W	L	PF	PA	PD	Mexico	Panama	Argentina	Chile	Jamaica	El Salvador
1	Mexico	5	5	0	264	85	+179	—	40–34	54–27	52–06	64–18	54–00
2	Panama	5	4	1	233	73	+160	34–40	—	55–21	50–06	40–06	54–00
3	Argentina	4	2	2	130	155	−25	27–54	21–55	—	36–18	46–28	00–00
4	Chile	5	2	3	89	163	−74	06–52	06–50	18–36	—	27–13	32–12
5	Jamaica	5	1	4	97	203	−106	18–64	06–40	28–46	13–27	—	32–26
6	El Salvador	0	0	0	38	175	−137	00–54	00–54	00–00	12–32	26–32	—

Updated to match(es) played on 13th September 2025. Source: https://affpanama.org/calendario_ffcc/

=== Final Round ===
==== 9-11 Classification Games ====
Date	Hour	Team 1	Score	Team 2
14 September	8:00 am ET	Colombia	31 - 12	El Salvador
14 September	11:45 am ET	Jamaica	19 - 26	Colombia

==== 5-8 Classification Games ====
Date	Hour	Team 1	Score	Team 2
14 September	8:00 am ET	Brazil	42 - 16	Chile
14 September	8:00 am ET	Argentina	21 - 20	Guatemala
14 September	10:30 am ET	Chile	08 - 13	Guatemala
14 September	1:00 pm ET	Brazil	07 - 00	Argentina

==== Semifinals ====
Date	Hour	Team 1	Score	Team 2
14 September	10:30 am ET	United States	32 - 12	Panama
14 September	10:30 am ET	Mexico	35 - 25	Canada

==== Bronze Medal Game ====
Date	Hour	Team 1	Score	Team 2
14 September	1:00 pm ET	Panama	22 - 32	Canada

==== Gold Medal Game ====
Date	Hour	Team 1	Score	Team 2	Note
14 September	3:30 pm ET	United States	00 - 00	Mexico	The final was cancelled due to inclement weather and the finalists were declared joint champions.

== Final ranking ==
1st place, gold medalist(s)	United States
1st place, gold medalist(s)	Mexico
3rd place, bronze medalist(s)	Canada
4	Panama
5	Brazil
6	Argentina
7	Guatemala
8	Chile
9	Colombia
10	Jamaica
11	El Salvador

== See also ==
- IFAF Americas Continental Flag Football Championship
- 2025 IFAF Americas Continental Women's Flag Football Championship
- 2026 IFAF Men's Flag Football World Championship
