= 2026 IFAF Men's Flag Football World Championship =

Tournament information
- Sport: Flag football
- Location: Düsseldorf
- Dates: 13 August–16 August
- Host: Germany
- Venue: 1
- Teams: 16

Final positions
- Champions: United States (7th title)
- Runner-up: Italy
- 3rd place: Canada

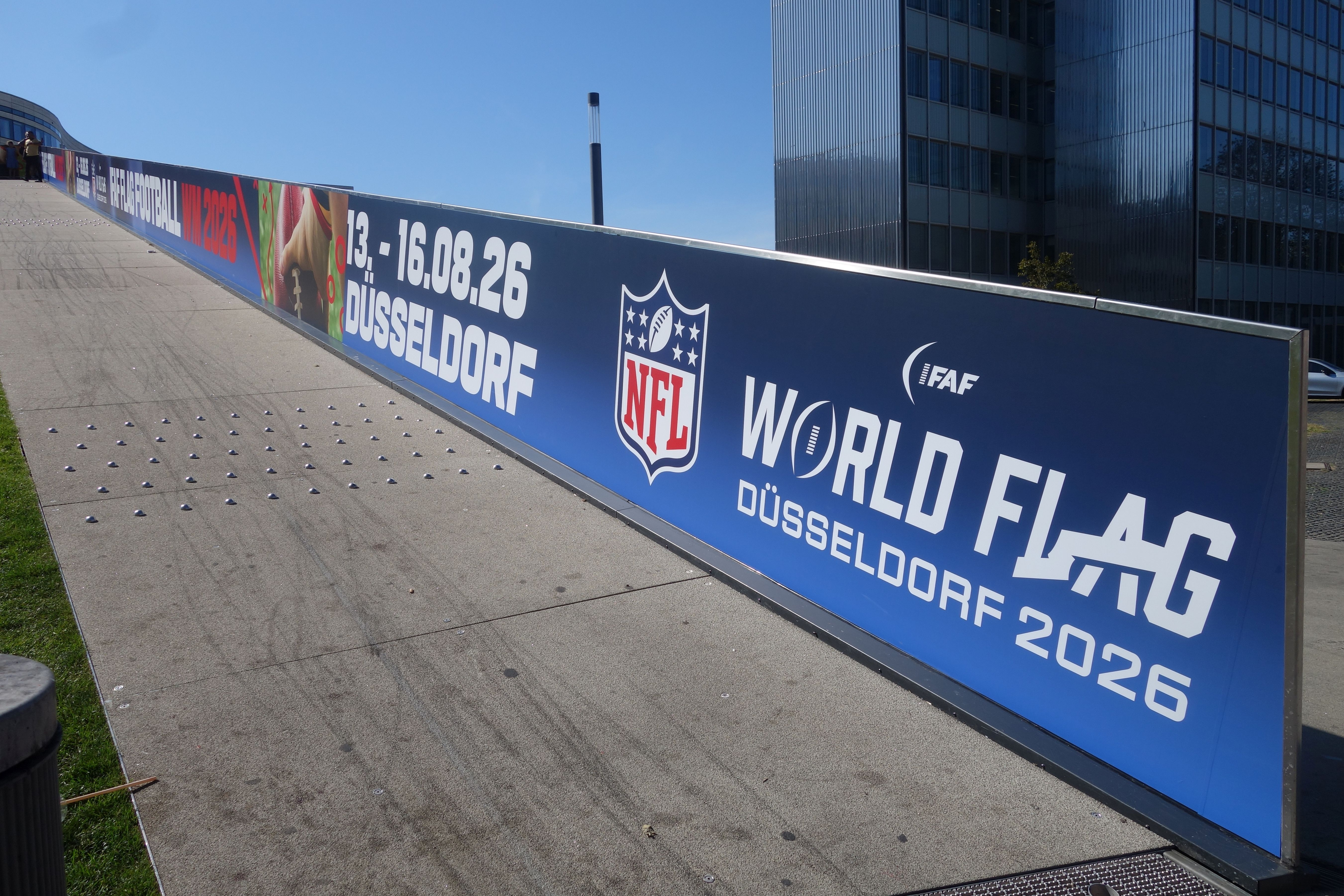
Promotion in Düsseldorf

The 2026 IFAF Men's Flag Football World Championship was the 12th World Championships in men's flag football. It was held in Düsseldorf, Germany, from 13 to 16 August 2026.

The United States are defending champions coming into the tournament and won their sixth consecutive and seventh overall title.

The top two teams (except the host nation and gold medalists United States) qualified to compete at the 2028 Summer Olympics in Los Angeles. Silver medalists Italy, and bronze medalists Canada were the teams that qualified.

== Venues ==
The championship will take place at Düsseldorf's flag football complex in Garath. The complex was inaugurated by the City of Düsseldorf and the New England Patriots in April 2025. Two fields are within the complex, which are the New England Patriots Flag Football Field and the Sebastian Vollmer Flag Football Field.

== Teams ==
=== Qualifiers ===
The International Federation of American Football introduced a new qualifying format for the Flag Football World Championships.

- 16 teams for each division (men's and women's)
- Host nation automatically qualifies
- Qualification via IFAF Continental Championships, in which the quotas are,
  - Europe: 6 berths
  - Americas: 4 berths
  - Asia-Oceania: 2 berths (one for each continent)
  - Africa: 1 berth
- Additional merit-based allocations for two continents based on past performances
- A maximum of six teams per continent (not including hosts)

Americas and Asia-Oceania were each given additional allocations for the performances of Panama and Japan respectively in the 2024 Men's Flag Football World Championships. Europe had higher ranked nations but could not secure any more berths due to the 6-team cap.

Qualified teams
Continent	Qualifying tournament	Team	Previous best performance	World ranking
Europe	Host nation	Germany	Runners up (2002, 2004)	11
Europe	2025 IFAF Men's European Flag Football Championship	Italy	3rd place (2010, 2014)	4
Europe	2025 IFAF Men's European Flag Football Championship	Austria	Champions (2002, 2004, 2012)	2
Europe	2025 IFAF Men's European Flag Football Championship	France	Champions (2006)	5
Europe	2025 IFAF Men's European Flag Football Championship	Great Britain		12
Europe	2025 IFAF Men's European Flag Football Championship	Israel		9
Europe	2025 IFAF Men's European Flag Football Championship	Switzerland	3rd place (2024)	6
Americas	2025 IFAF Men's Americas Flag Football Championship	Mexico	Runners up (2014, 2021)	3
Americas	2025 IFAF Men's Americas Flag Football Championship	United States	Champions (2010, 2014, 2016, 2018, 2021, 2024)	1
Americas	2025 IFAF Men's Americas Flag Football Championship	Canada	Champions (2008)	10
Americas	2025 IFAF Men's Americas Flag Football Championship	Panama	3rd place (2021)	13
Americas	2025 IFAF Men's Americas Flag Football Championship	Brazil		17
Asia	2025 IFAF Men's Asia-Oceania Flag Football Championship	Japan	4th place (2004)	7
Oceania	2025 IFAF Men's Asia-Oceania Flag Football Championship	Australia		8
Oceania	2025 IFAF Men's Asia-Oceania Flag Football Championship	American Samoa		33
Africa	2025 IFAF Men's Africa Flag Football Championship	Nigeria		32

2025 continental champions

=== Groups ===
The 16 teams are sorted into four groups of four based on the IFAF World Rankings in serpentine order.

Group A	Group B	Group C	Group D
United States (1)	Austria (2)	Mexico (3)	Italy (4)
Australia (8)	Japan (7)	Switzerland (6)	France (5)
Israel (9)	Canada (10)	Germany (hosts) (11)	Great Britain (12)
American Samoa (33)	Nigeria (32)	Brazil (17)	Panama (13)

On 10 August 2026, the Nigerian Federation of American Football informed the International Federation of American Football of their withdrawal due to the inability of the traveling delegation to secure the necessary visas in time for the tournament. As there was no time to replace Nigeria, all their matches were forfeited with a score of 1-0.

== Results ==
=== Preliminary round ===
==== Group A ====
Pos	Team	Pld	W	L	PF	PA	PD	Qualification	American Samoa	United States	Australia	Israel
1	American Samoa	3	2	1	83	79	+4	Quarter-finals	—	38–32	21–7	24–40
2	United States	3	2	1	122	83	+39	Quarter-finals	32–38	—	40–7	50–38
3	Australia	3	1	2	50	87	−37		7–21	7–40	—	36–26
4	Israel	3	1	2	104	110	−6		40–24	38–50	26–36	—

Updated to match(es) played on 14th August 2026. Source: IFAF World Flag 2026

==== Group B ====
Pos	Team	Pld	W	L	PF	PA	PD	Qualification	Japan	Canada	Austria	Nigeria
1	Japan	3	3	0	81	70	+11	Quarter-finals	—	37–28	43–42	1–0
2	Canada	3	2	1	55	43	+12	Quarter-finals	28–37	—	26–6	1–0
3	Austria	3	1	2	49	69	−20		42–43	6–26	—	1–0
4	Nigeria	3	0	3	0	3	−3		0–1	0–1	0–1	—

Updated to match(es) played on 14th August 2026. Source: IFAF World Flag 2026

==== Group C ====
Pos	Team	Pld	W	L	PF	PA	PD	Qualification	Mexico	Germany	Switzerland	Brazil
1	Mexico	3	3	0	106	79	+27	Quarter-finals	—	30–22	38–32	38–25
2	Germany	3	2	1	92	70	+22	Quarter-finals	22–30	—	42–28	28–12
3	Switzerland	3	1	2	112	99	+13		32–38	28–42	—	52–19
4	Brazil	3	0	3	56	118	−62		25–38	12–28	19–52	—

Updated to match(es) played on 14th August 2026. Source: IFAF World Flag 2026

==== Group D ====
Pos	Team	Pld	W	L	PF	PA	PD	Qualification	Italy	Panama	France	United Kingdom
1	Italy	3	3	0	100	79	+21	Quarter-finals	—	45–36	34–31	21–12
2	Panama	3	2	1	102	98	+4	Quarter-finals	36–45	—	33–26	33–27
3	France	3	1	2	100	99	+1		31–34	26–33	—	43–32
4	Great Britain	3	0	3	71	97	−26		12–21	27–33	32–43	—

Updated to match(es) played on 14th August 2026. Source: IFAF World Flag 2026

=== Championship round ===
Quarter-finals
15 August
American Samoa	14
Canada	24
15 August
Italy	38
Germany	22
15 August
Mexico	33
Panama	19
15 August
Japan	38
United States	45

Semi-finals
15 August
Canada	36
Italy	41
15 August
Mexico	40
United States	42

Final
16 August
Italy	26
United States	46
Bronze medal game
16 August
Canada	34
Mexico	26

=== Placement matches ===
==== 5th place bracket ====
5th-8th place semi-finals
15 August
American Samoa	34
Germany	32
15 August
Panama	38
Japan	42

5th place
16 August
American Samoa	48
Japan	38
7th place
16 August
Germany	32
Panama	33

==== 9th place bracket ====
First round
15 August
France	41
Brazil	25
15 August
Australia	1
Nigeria	0
15 August
Austria	20
Israel	42
15 August
Switzerland	50
Great Britain	35

Second round
15 August
France	39
Australia	19
15 August
Israel	45
Switzerland	54

9th place
16 August
France	35
Switzerland	29
11th place
16 August
Australia	36
Israel	38

==== 13th place bracket ====
13th-16th place semi-finals
15 August
Brazil	1
Nigeria	0
15 August
Austria	20
Great Britain	28

13th place
16 August
Brazil	26
Great Britain	33
15th place
16 August
Nigeria	0
Austria	1

== Final ranking ==
Rank	Team
1st place, gold medalist(s)	United States
2nd place, silver medalist(s)	Italy
3rd place, bronze medalist(s)	Canada
4	Mexico
5	American Samoa
6	Japan
7	Panama
8	Germany
9	France
10	Switzerland
11	Israel
12	Australia
13	Great Britain
14	Brazil
15	Austria
16	Nigeria

Qualified for the 2028 Summer Olympics.

== Television ==
In May 2026, streaming network DAZN acquired global broadcasting rights to all IFAF events in a multi-year agreement, including the men's world championship.

In Canada, all games are also broadcast on CBC Gem and the CBC Sports website.

== See also ==
- 2026 IFAF Women's Flag Football World Championship
