= Thailand men's national flag football team =

Thailand
Logo

National team information
- Federation: Thailand American Football Association
- IFAF continental area: Asia

Championships
- Asia Championships: 1: 2015

The Thailand men's national flag football team represents the Thailand in men's international flag football matches. It is managed by the Thailand American Football Association.

== History ==
=== Early years ===
Flag football was introduced in Thailand around the late 1980s by businessman Pichet Sithi-Amnuai and his friends in parallel with efforts by the US National Football League (NFL) to promote American football globally.

In the 2000s, Thailand has sent youth teams to the NFL Flag Football World Championship. School teams representing Thailand won the 2005 and 2006 editions.

=== World Championship debut and onwards ===
At the IFAF Flag Football World Championship in 2006, the Thailand senior flag football team finished as bronze medallists.

Thailand were the champions of the inaugural 2015 IFAF Asia Flag Football Championship in Ho Chi Minh City, Vietnam. It ended as runners-up in the 2017 edition in Taguig, Philippines.

Thailand won the inaugural 2023 IFAF Men's Asia-Oceania Flag Football Championship which supplanted the Asia Flag Football Championships. In July 2025, flag football was recognized as an official sport by the Sports Authority of Thailand.

At the 2025 IFAF Asia-Oceania Championship in Ningbo, China, Thailand finished fifth in the Asia-Oceania competition ranking and third in the Asia competition ranking.
