= Japan men's national flag football team =

Japan
Logo

National team information
- Federation: Japan American Football Association
- IFAF continental area: Asia

Personnel
- Head coach: Ayumu Iwai

Nickname
- Flag Football Japan (フラッグフットボールJAPAN)

Championships
- Asia Championships: 1: 2017

The Japan men's national flag football team represents Japan in men's international flag football matches. The sport is governed by Japan American Football Association.

== History ==
Japan has played in the IFAF Flag Football World Championship. It debuted in 2004, in the second edition in France where the Nakano Bagus played as the Japan national flag football team. 2004 had two tournaments, in both 5-a-side and 7-a-side flag football. The latter format was dropped in the following edition.

Japan was represented by a single team in the next six iterations until the 2016 edition. The following teams represented Japan: Nakano (2004), Shigotoba Green Grass (2006), Tokyo Metropolitan University of Health Sciences (2008), Riverside Gamblers Ichikawa (2010 and 2012), Kawasaki Frontiers (2014) and the Kyoto Juveniles (2016)

Japan took took part at the IFAF Asia Flag Football Championship; the 2015 edition in Ho Chi Minh City, Vietnam where they lost to Thailand in the final., and the 2017 edition in Taguig, Philippines where they won the championship at the expense of Thailand.

In 2018, the Japan team's roster at the World Championship began to be selected from multipe clubs rather than a single team.

With the inclusion of flag football in the Olympics, particularly the 2028 Summer Olympics in Los Angeles, the code of American football has seen a growth in Japan challenging the foothold of tackle football.

At the inaugural 2023 IFAF Men's Asia-Oceania Flag Football Championship in Malaysia, Japan finished third. In the 2025 Asia-Oceania Championship in China, Japan lost to Australia in the overall final, ending up as runners-up in the combined Asia-Oceania competition ranking.

== Competitive record ==
=== IFAF Flag Football World Championship ===
Year	Position	GP	W	L	PF	PA
(Austria) 2002	Did not enter					
(France) 2004	4th place (5-a-side)					
(France) 2004	3rd place (7-a-side)					
(South Korea) 2006	6th place					
(Canada) 2008	8th place					
(Canada) 2010	8th place					
(Sweden) 2012	7th place					
(Italy) 2014	12th place					
(United States) 2016	11th place					
(Panama) 2018	8th place					
(Israel) 2021	11th place	6	3	3	184	152
(Finland) 2024	11th place	7	5	2	243	120

=== Olympic Games ===
Year	Position	GP	W	L	PF	PA
(United States) 2028	To be determined					

=== IFAF Asia Flag Football Championship ===
Year	Position	GP	W	D	L	PF	PA
(Vietnam) 2015	2nd place	5	3	0	2	140	89
(Philippines) 2017	1st place	5	2	1	2	175	154

=== IFAF Asia Oceania Flag Football Championship ===
Year	Position	GP	W	L	PF	PA
(Malaysia) 2023	3rd place	7	2	5	—	—
(China) 2025	2nd place	2	5	1	229	154
