= Italy men's national flag football team =

Italy

National team information
- Federation: Italian Federation of American Football
- IFAF continental area: Europe

Nickname
- Azzuri (lit. 'The Blues')

Championships
- European championships: 1: 2025

The Italy men's national flag football team represents Italy in men's international flag football competitions. The team is governed by the Italian Federation of American Football (FIDAF).

== History ==
The Italy national flag football team program has been active as early as 2004.

Italy have frequented the IFAF European Flag Football Championship having its first podium finish in 2005 when it won a silver. It duplicated this finish three times, in 2009, 2013, and 2017. The team won their first IFAF European Flag Football Championship gold in the 2025 edition in Paris.

They also have played in the IFAF Flag Football World Championship, earning a bronze medal in the 2010 and 2014 editions. The latter iteration was hosted by Italy in Grosseto.

At the 2022 World Games in Birmingham, Alabama, U.S., Italy won silver.

Italy later qualified for the flag football tournament of the 2028 Summer Olympics in Los Angeles by virtue of being a finalist at the 2026 IFAF Flag Football World Championship They finished second, losing to the United States in the final.

== Competitive record ==
=== IFAF World Championship ===
Year	Position	GP	W	L	PF	PA
(Israel) 2021	4th place	7	5	2	287	226
(Finland) 2024	6th place	3	3	2	214	139
(Germany) 2026	Runners-up	6	5	1	206	183

=== Olympic Games ===
Year	Position	GP	W	L	PF	PA
(United States) 2028	Qualified					

=== World Games ===
Year	Position	GP	W	L	PF	PA
(United States) 2022	Runners-up	6	5	1	213	195
(China) 2025	Not held					
Total	No title	1/1				
