= Denmark men's national flag football team =

Denmark

National team information
- Federation: Danish American Football Federation
- IFAF continental area: Europe

Championships
- European championships: 6: 2009, 2011, 2013, 2015, 2017, 2019

The Denmark men's national flag football team represents Denmark in men's international flag football matches. The sport is governed by the Danish American Football Federation. The team won a record six consecutive European Championships. They also won silver four times in the World Championship. They have 14 medals in total. In 2023, the International Federation of American Football (IFAF) ranked the Denmark men's team 11th worldwide. In 2025 they fell to 14th.

Brøndby Stadium is their home stadium. In 2024 Nadia Panzio was chosen as President of the organization, while Jonas Christiansen replaced Kasper Lindén as head coach.

Denmark men's won the 2019 IFAF European Flag Football Championship in Jerusalem, Israel. They defeated Spain 52-35 to claim their 6th gold medal. In the 2021 IFAF Men's Flag Football World Championship, they lost to Panama in the quarterfinals. During the 2022 World Games, Mexico beat them in the quarterfinals. Germany defeated them in the semi-finals during the 2023 IFAF European Flag Football Championship in Limerick, Ireland.

== Players ==
=== Current squad ===
(player and team as of June 2024)

- Alexander Kronborg Bjerre, Amager Demons
- Benjamin Boraghi, Scarlet Armadillos
- Christopher Bay Carstens, Randers Rednex
- Frederik Daugaard Andersen, Aaruhus Tigers
- Jakob Green, Copenhagen Towers
- Johannes Bladt Andersen, Odense Badgers
- Jonas Bo Hansen, Scarlet Armadillos
- Jonas Fog Jensen, Odense Badgers
- Kristoffer Skræddergaard Mogensen, Copenhagen Creatures
- Magnus Alexander Bitsch, Copenhage Towers
- Magnus Urth, Aarhus Tigers
- Markus Nørrung, Amager Demons
- Mats Stage Baxter, Edinburgh Outlaws
- Niklas Dyrby Johansen, Scarlet Armadillos
- Oliver Høiby, Amager Demons
- Oscar Broge-Starck, Amager Demons
- Rasmus Bergsli Hansen, Amager Demons
- Rasmus Norup, Scarlet Armadillos
- Samuel Ringheim, Amager Demons
- Thomas Holbæk, Scarlett Armadillos
- Thorkil Ørbæk, Valby Royals
- Viggo Elmose Eriksen, Scarlett Armadillos
- William Mose Poulsen, Odense Badgers
