= Panama men's national flag football team =

Panama

National team information
- Federation: American Football Federation of Panama
- IFAF continental area: Americas

The Panama men's national flag football team represents Panama in men's international flag football competitions. The team is governed by the American Football Federation of Panama.

The team has won one medal at the IFAF Flag Football World Championship, a bronze medal in 2021, and a gold medal at the 2025 Central American Games. They also won a bronze medal at the IFAF Americas Continental Flag Football Championship in 2023.

== History ==
Panama has played in the IFAF Flag Football World Championship, winning their first bronze medal in 2021, leading them to qualify for the 2022 World Games.

IFAF Americas organizes flag football continental championships every two years to fall in between the world championships dubbed the IFAF Americas Continental Flag Football Championship. The Panama men's team competed in the 2023 edition, where they defeated Canada in the bronze medal match. They competed in the 2025 edition, where they lost to Canada in the bronze medal match.

Flag football made its debut at the regional Central American Games in 2025. The tournament was hosted at the Estadio Emilio Royo in Panama City. (Note: While Guatemala served as the official host of the Games, Panama hosted the flag football and esports competitions while Honduras hosted the sambo and wrestling events.) Panama won the gold medal after a dominant performance, in which they went 4–0 in pool play before defeating Nicaragua 52–14 in the semifinals and Guatemala 47–12 in the gold medal game.
