= IFAF Flag Football World Championship =

International championship in flag football

- Sport: Flag football
- Founded: 2002
- Most recent champions: United States (men); Canada (women)
- Most titles: United States (men; 7 titles); United States; Mexico; Canada (women; 3 titles each)

IFAF Flag Football World Championship is the international championship in flag football, organized by International Federation of American Football.

== Description ==
The men's and women's competitions are usually held in the same venue. The tournament starts with pool play to fill in the seeding and follows an elimination-style of play after that. At the end of the tournament the top teams are rewarded with Bronze (3rd), Silver (2nd) or Gold (1st). The IFAF Flag Football World Championship is held every two years in different countries.

== History ==
The first championship was held in Austria in 2002 and was won by the host country team in the men's category and by Sweden in the women's.

The tournament was moved or cancelled on occasion. The 2014 championships was moved from Israel to Italy. The 2016 edition was supposed to be held in the Bahamas but was moved due to internal disputes among flag football stakeholders in the country.

Due to the COVID-19 pandemic, the 2020 championships in Denmark were cancelled. The championship was rescheduled for 2021 in Jerusalem from 6 to 8 December, with a record 42 teams featured, double that competing at the 2018 event in Panama. The top seven teams at the event, not including the United States, qualified for the 2022 World Games in Birmingham, Alabama.

The eleventh edition was held in Lahti, Finland, from 27–30 August 2024. The United States won the title in both the men's and the women's categories.

== Results ==
=== Men ===
Year	Host country	Gold medal game			Bronze medal game		
Year	Host country	Gold	Score	Silver	Bronze	Score	Fourth place
2002; Details	Austria	Austria	6–0	Germany	France	12–6	Sweden
2004; Details	France	Austria	26–24	Germany	France	40-23	Japan
2006; Details	South Korea	France	46–32	Denmark	Thailand	45–33	Austria
2008; Details	Canada	Canada	12–6	Denmark	France	45–0	United States
2010; Details	Canada	United States	35–19	Denmark	Italy	28–24	Canada
2012; Details	Sweden	Austria	47–40	United States	Denmark	44–33	Mexico
2014; Details	Italy	United States	40–14	Mexico	Italy	53–14	Canada
2016; Details	United States	United States	33–32	Denmark	Mexico	39–26	Austria
2018; Details	Panama	United States	19–13	Austria	Denmark	38–34	Mexico
2021; Details	Israel	United States	44–41	Mexico	Panama	45–40	Italy
2024; Details	Finland	United States	53–21	Austria	Switzerland	41–35	Mexico
2026; Details	Germany	United States	46–26	Italy	Canada	34–26	Mexico

=== Women ===
Year	Host country	Gold medal game			Bronze medal game		
Year	Host country	Gold	Score	Silver	Bronze	Score	Fourth place
2002; Details	Austria	Sweden	–	France	—	—	—
2004; Details	France	Mexico	42–12	Finland	Sweden	6–0	France
2006; Details	South Korea	France	46–32	Japan	Finland	45–33	Sweden
2008; Details	Canada	Mexico	27–18	Canada	France	19–13	United States
2010; Details	Canada	Canada	31–18	United States	Austria	33–20	Mexico
2012; Details	Sweden	Mexico	33–32	United States	France	39–27	Austria
2014; Details	Italy	Canada	32–21	United States	Austria	34–20	Mexico
2016; Details	United States	Panama	35–22	Austria	Mexico	41–20	Canada
2018; Details	Panama	United States	27–12	Panama	Canada	19–13	Mexico
2021; Details	Israel	United States	31–21	Mexico	Austria	26–13	Brazil
2024; Details	Finland	United States	31–18	Mexico	Japan	41–40	Austria
2026; Details	Germany	Canada	27–20	United States	Mexico	20–19	Great Britain

== Medals ==
=== Men ===
Rank	Nation	Gold	Silver	Bronze	Total
1	United States	7	1	0	8
2	Austria	3	2	0	5
3	France	1	0	3	4
4	Canada	1	0	1	2
5	Denmark	0	4	2	6
6	Mexico	0	2	1	3
7	Germany	0	2	0	2
8	Italy	0	1	2	3
9	Panama	0	0	1	1
9	Switzerland	0	0	1	1
9	Thailand	0	0	1	1
Totals (11 entries)		12	12	12	36

=== Women ===
Rank	Nation	Gold	Silver	Bronze	Total
1	United States	3	4	0	7
2	Mexico	3	2	2	7
3	Canada	3	1	1	5
4	France	1	1	2	4
5	Panama	1	1	0	2
6	Sweden	1	0	1	2
7	Austria	0	1	3	4
8	Finland	0	1	1	2
8	Japan	0	1	1	2
Totals (9 entries)		12	12	11	35
