= Flag football at the 2028 Summer Olympics =

Flag football at the Games of the XXXIV Olympiad
- Venue: BMO Stadium
- Date: July 15–22, 2028
- No. of events: 2 (1 men, 1 women)
- Competitors: 120

The flag football competitions at the 2028 Summer Olympics are scheduled to be held from July 15–22, 2028, at BMO Stadium in Los Angeles, California.

The sport of flag football is scheduled to make its Olympic debut after being added as host choice sport in October 2023.

== Qualification ==
A total of 12 teams (six per tournament) will qualify to compete. The United States as hosts qualified teams in both men’s and women’s events automatically. The remaining ten teams qualified through three qualification tournaments.

=== Qualification summary ===
Nation	Men's	Women's	Athletes
Canada	Yes	Yes	20
Italy	Yes		10
Mexico		Yes	10
United States	Yes	Yes	20
Total: 4 NOCs	3/6	3/6	60/120

=== Men's qualification ===
Means of qualification	Dates	Venue(s)	Berth(s)	Qualified
Host nation	—N/a	—N/a	1	United States
2026 IFAF Men's Flag Football World Championship	August 13–16, 2026	(Germany) Düsseldorf	2	Italy; Canada
2028 Olympic Qualifier Series – Montreal	June 1–4, 2028	(Canada) Montreal	2	
2028 Olympic Qualifier Series – Orlando	June 8–11, 2028	(United States) Orlando	1	
Total			6	

=== Women's qualification ===
Means of qualification	Dates	Venue(s)	Berth(s)	Qualified
Host nation	—N/a	—N/a	1	United States
2026 IFAF Women's Flag Football World Championship	August 13–16, 2026	(Germany) Düsseldorf	2	Canada; Mexico
2028 Olympic Qualifier Series – Montreal	June 1–4, 2028	(Canada) Montreal	2	
2028 Olympic Qualifier Series – Orlando	June 8–11, 2028	(United States) Orlando	1	
Total			6	
