= Flag football at the 2022 World Games =

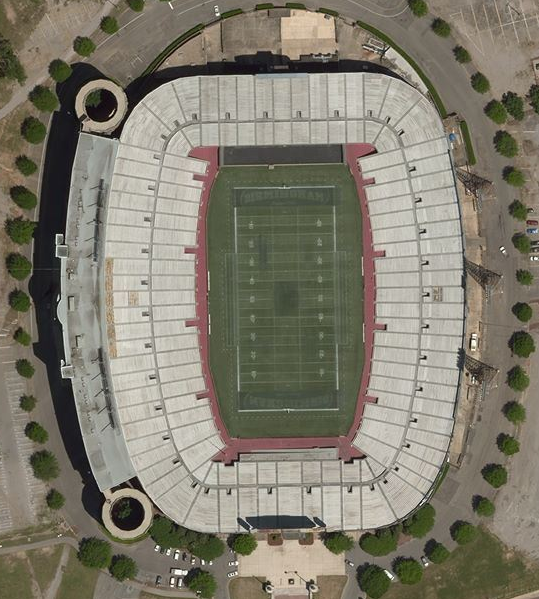
- Legion Field, venue for flag football
- Venue: Legion Field
- Dates: 10–14 July 2022
- No. of events: 2
- Competitors: 192 from 10 nations

The flag football competition at the 2022 World Games took place in July 2022, in Birmingham, Alabama in the United States.

Originally scheduled to take place in July 2021, the Games were rescheduled for July 2022 as a result of the 2020 Summer Olympics postponement due to the COVID-19 pandemic. Flag football competition made its debut on The World Games programme and featured eight men's teams and eight women's teams from around the world who competed at Legion Field. José Perurena, IWGA President, stated, "In Birmingham, for the first time, invitational sports were no longer presented separately but were also part of the official programme."

== Overview ==
On July 20, 2020, the International World Games Association (IWGA), National Football League (NFL), and International Federation of American Football (IFAF) announced that flag football would join the existing lineup of 32 unique, multi-disciplinary sports for the 2022 World Games in Birmingham, Alabama.

The 2022 World Games, which marked the 40th anniversary of the event, took place from July 7–17, 2022. Hosted at Birmingham's historic Legion Field, flag football featured eight men's teams and eight women's teams from around the world.

As current reigning world champions (and host nation), the United States men's and women's teams both pre-qualified for the 2022 World Games. The remaining seven teams were selected through the IFAF qualifying process.

== Participating nations ==
=== Men's tournament ===
- Austria
- Denmark
- France
- Germany
- Italy
- Mexico
- Panama
- United States

=== Women's tournament ===
- Austria
- Brazil
- France
- Italy
- Japan
- Mexico
- Panama
- United States

== Medal table ==
* Host nation (United States)

Rank	Nation	Gold	Silver	Bronze	Total
1	United States*	1	1	0	2
2	Mexico	1	0	1	2
3	Italy	0	1	0	1
4	Panama	0	0	1	1
Totals (4 entries)		2	2	2	6

== Medalists ==
Event	Gold	Silver	Bronze
Men's tournament	United States; Aamir Brown; Geoffrey Bryan; James Calhoun; Laval Davis; Darrell Doucette; Dezmin Lewis; Bruce Mapp; Jordan Oquendo; David Price; Johnny Rembert; Ladderick Smith; Frankie Solomon	Italy; Gerardo Frazzetto; Matteo Galante; Jared Lee Gerbino; Matteo Mozzanica; Riccardo Petrilli; Flavio Piccinni; Gianluca Santagostino; Lorenzo Scaperrotta; Tamsir Seck; Mark Andrew Simone; Giuseppe della Vecchia; Luke Zahradka	Mexico; Victor Balderramos; Bruno Espinoza; Carlos Espinoza; Alejandro Esquer; Cosme Hernandez; Ivan Roberto Mendez; Jorge Olivera; Joshua Olivo; Carlos Olvera; David Ramirez; Said Salazar; Guillermo Villalobos
Women's tournament	Mexico; Silvia Contreras; Andrea Delgadillo; Diana Flores; Rebecca Landa; Arianna Lora; Indra Montes; Ingrid Ramirez; Monica Rangel; Pamela Reyes; Xiomara Rios; Ana Valeria Rojano; Sheilla Silva	United States; Deliah Autry; Nadia Bibbs; Mary Kate Bula; Sheneika Comice; Crystal Daniels; Mariah Gearhart; Vanita Krouch; Joann Overstreet; Ayanna Pate; Michelle Roque; Ashley Whisonant; Crystal Winter	Panama; Valerie Castillero; Andrea Castillo; Orlanda Castro; Leslie del Cid; Ángela Evans; Maria de Lourdes Gallimore; Arlen Hernandez; Ana Paula de Leon; Ayin Rodriguez; Maria Rodriguez; Tatiana dos Santos; Thaymiluz Santos

== Men's tournament ==
=== Pool A ===
Pos	Team	Pld	W	L	PF	PA	Diff
1	Italy	3	3	0	95	82	+13
2	Austria	3	2	1	84	81	+3
3	Mexico	3	1	2	78	72	+6
4	Germany	3	0	3	68	90	−22

=== Pool B ===
Pos	Team	Pld	W	L	PF	PA	Diff
1	United States	3	3	0	105	34	+71
2	Denmark	3	2	1	61	64	−3
3	Panama	3	1	2	67	82	−15
4	France	3	0	3	39	92	−53

=== Knock-out round ===
Quarterfinals
B1	United States	w/o
A4	Germany
A2	Austria	18
B3	Panama	7
B2	Denmark	18
A3	Mexico	34
A1	Italy	41
B4	France	38

Semifinals
B1	United States	54
A2	Austria	19
A3	Mexico	29
A1	Italy	41

Finals
B1	United States	46
A1	Italy	36
Third place
A2	Austria	35
A3	Mexico	39

== Women's tournament ==
=== Pool A ===
Pos	Team	Pld	W	L	PF	PA	Diff
1	United States	3	3	0	97	59	+38
2	Panama	3	2	1	93	56	+37
3	Austria	3	1	2	80	78	+2
4	France	3	0	3	44	121	−77

=== Pool B ===
Pos	Team	Pld	W	L	PF	PA	Diff
1	Mexico	3	3	0	125	19	+106
2	Japan	3	2	1	57	68	−11
3	Italy	3	1	2	39	87	−48
4	Brazil	3	0	3	45	92	−47

=== Knock-out round ===
Quarterfinals
B1	Mexico	41
A4	France	6
A2	Panama	33
B3	Italy	13
B2	Japan	32
A3	Austria	39
A1	United States	32
B4	Brazil	7

Semifinals
B1	Mexico	36
A2	Panama	7
A3	Austria	32
A1	United States	41

Finals
B1	Mexico	39
A1	United States	6
Third place
A2	Panama	40
A3	Austria	19
