= Tonga National Tag Team =

Tonga's National Tag Rugby Team is also known as Laione Hau. The figurative symbol of the lion is synonymous with The King of Tonga and historic battles fought and conquered by Tongan kings and warriors. The governing body for tag rugby or flag football for Tonga is called Tonga Tag. Tag rugby is the original creation of this growing sport. In most parts of The United States and Canada they called it flag football or American flag rugby. An increasing number of countries participate in the sport of tag rugby, including Australia, England, Ireland, New Zealand, USA, France, Samoa, Cook Islands, Niue, Fiji and Tonga. The International Woman's Flag Football Association also runs a tournament that involves countries like the United States, Canada, Denmark, Sweden, Finland and Mexico.

Tonga Tag plays most variants of tag rugby and flag football; tag rugby is the most predominant in Tonga. Although Tonga has been represented in the past, they have been residential teams. Laione Hau or Tonga Tag is the first official Tonga national tag team.

== Coat of arms ==
The coat of arms for the National Tag team consists of two golden lions facing each other depicting Loyalty. Between the lions is a shield presenting the Tongan flag with a water mark of a rugby ball. Above the shield and the lions is the royal crown. [1]

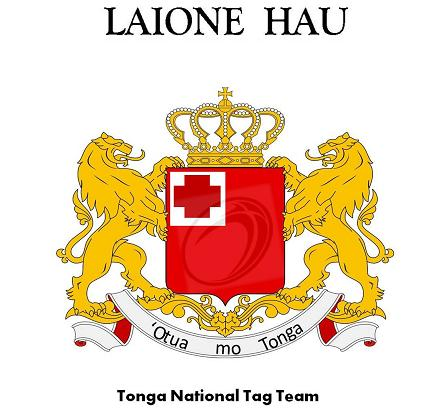
Laione Hau – Tonga Tag Coat of Arms

== Motto ==
Otua mo Tonga (God and Tonga)

== History ==
Tag rugby is a new sport in Tongatapu but widely played around the world. Tag rugby was developed from the sport Rugby league. Until recently, tag was not widely known or played locally in Tonga. The sport was introduced approximately in 2007, but lack of supervision and development throughout the Kingdom of Tonga caused participation in the sport to decline. In October 2011, tag rugby was reintroduced in Tonga with an innovating difference to cement tag rugby as a bonfire sport and become internationally competitive.

In January 2012, Tonga entered the first official tag team into the Tag Pacific Cup held and hosted by New Zealand in Auckland. One team was entered, an open men's team. [2] Tag rugby is becoming a popular sport and reviving great interests from athletes of Tongan descent to represent their mother land. Although tag is at a grass roots level in Tonga, many athletes residing outside of Tonga play proficiently and represent other developed national teams such as Australia, Ireland, England and New Zealand.

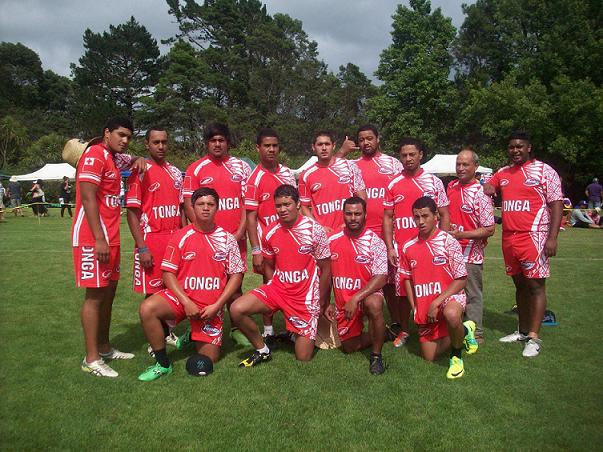
Tonga National Tag Team – Open men's. Tag20 Pacific Cup, NZ 2012

=== Stepping stone ===
In 2010, Tag rugby was reintroduced hoping to develop further through the Kingdom.

In October 2011, the sport of tag was registered in Tonga by Caroline Matamua and the first official Tonga National Tag Team was born. The Tonga national governing body for all codes and variants of tag for Tonga is called Tonga National Tag Association, or Tonga Tag™.

February 2012, Tonga Tag entered two teams. First Official Under20s and first Official Open men's. Both reaching quarter finals.

1–2 March 2013, Tonga Tag entered four teams. U20s, Open Men's, first Official Open Women's and First Official Open Mixed. All reaching Semis.

22 February 2014, First Junior Pacific Cup (5yrs-16yrs) Tonga entered 3 teams. FirstU8s, U12s, U14s. Tonga under8s won the grade, CURRENT U8 Champions. U12s and U14s went through to semis. Over all placings for tournament was 3rd.

8–9 February 2014,*Senior Pacific Cup – Tonga entered only one team. The Under 16yrs team was not entered into the Junior Pacific Cup but entered into the Senior Pacific Cup. Tonga beat New Zealand in the semis to play New Zealand Barbarians in the Cup Finals. NZ Barbarians winning Cup final, runner up Tonga.

=== History of coaches and management (2005–2011) ===
Listed below are all New Zealand residential teams of Tongan descent representing Tonga.

==== 2012 – Pacific Cup ====
First Official Tonga National Tag Team

Section	Coach	Captain
Open men's	Caroline Matamua	Matini Fonokalafi

==== 2013 – Pacific Cup ====
Section	Coach	Manager	Captain
Under 20s	Sione Lauaki	Caroline Matamua	Sefo Vaea
Open Mix	Caroline Matamua	Caroline Matamua
Open Men's	Sione Lauaki	Caroline Matamua	falani Vea
Open Women's	Caroline Matamua	Caroline Matamua	Ake Fotu-Moala

==== Pacific Cup 2014 ====
===== First Junior Pacific Cup =====
Age group	Coach	Manager	Captain
Under 8	Noelene	Ana Talakai	Malakai Wolfgramm
Under 12	Caroline Matamua	Pearl Vea	Chris Vea'ila
Under 14	Falani Vea	Pearl Vea
U20s	Falani Vea	Shaz Lokotui	Robert Edmonds

== Upcoming events ==
- Tag rugby – The International Tag Cup in Gold Coast, Australia.
- Tag football – Tag World Cup, New Zealand.

== See also ==
- Tag Rugby
- Flag Football
- Tongan language
- Tongan paʻanga
