= Rugby sevens =

Rugby union variant

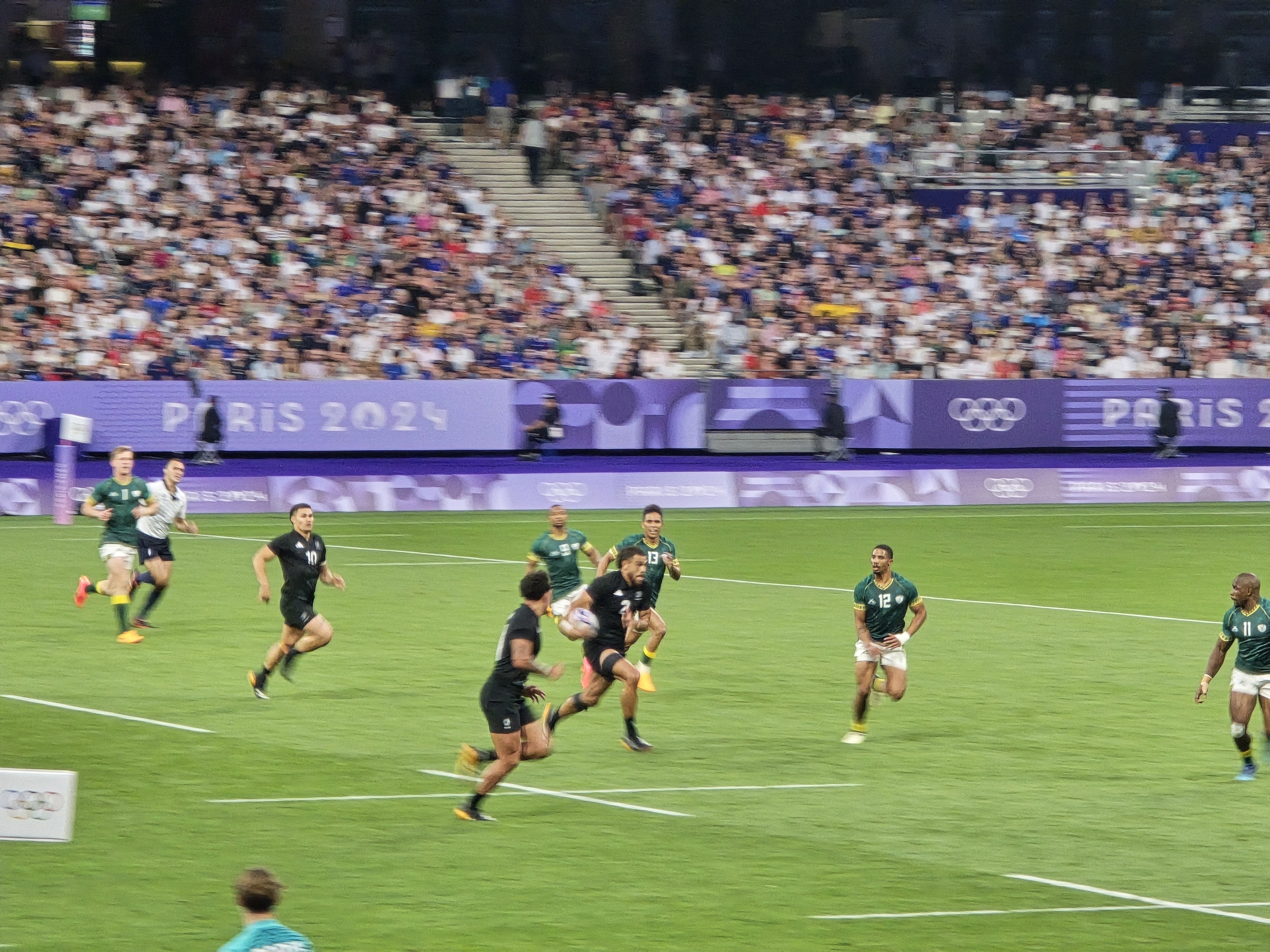
- Rugby sevens at the 2024 Summer Olympics.
- Highest governing body: World Rugby
- Nicknames: Sevens, 7s, VIIs, Seven-a-side
- First played: 1883 in Melrose, Scotland

Characteristics
- Contact: Full
- Team members: 7
- Mixed-sex: Separate competitions
- Type: Outdoor team sport, variant of rugby union
- Equipment: Rugby ball

Presence
- Olympic: 2016 onwards
- World Games: 2001 – 2013

Pictogram for Rugby sevens at the Summer Olympics

Rugby sevens (commonly known simply as sevens, and originally seven-a-side rugby) is a variant of rugby union in which teams are made up of seven players playing seven-minute halves, instead of the usual 15 players playing 40-minute halves. Rugby sevens is administered by World Rugby, the body responsible for rugby union worldwide. The game is popular at all levels, with amateur and club tournaments generally held in the summer months. Sevens is one of the most well distributed forms of rugby, and is popular in parts of Africa, Asia, Europe, and the Americas, and especially in the South Pacific.

Rugby sevens originated in the 1880s in the Scottish town of Melrose; the Melrose Sevens tournament is still played annually. The popularity of rugby sevens increased further with the development of the Hong Kong Sevens in the 1970s and was later followed by the inclusion of the sport into the Commonwealth Games for the first time in 1998 and the establishment of the annual World Rugby Sevens Series in 1999 and the World Rugby Women's Sevens Series in 2012. In 2016, rugby sevens was contested in the Summer Olympics for the first time. It has also been played in events such as the Games of the Small States of Europe, Pan American Games and the Asian Games, and in 2018 a women's tournament was played for the first time at the Commonwealth Games.

== Overview ==
Rugby sevens is sanctioned by World Rugby, and is played under similar laws (with exceptions noted below) and on a field of the same dimensions as the 15 player game. Whereas a regular rugby union match lasts at least 80 minutes, a normal sevens match consists of two halves of seven minutes with a two-minute half-time break. Previously, the final of a competition could be played over two halves of ten minutes each, but beginning in 2017, final-round matches were limited to seven-minute halves (excluding ties) in an effort to reduce injuries. Sevens scores are generally comparable to regular rugby scores, but scoring occurs much more frequently in sevens, since the defenders are more spaced out. The scoring system is the same as regular rugby union, namely five points for a try, three points for a penalty or drop goal and two points for a post-try conversion.

The shorter match length allows rugby sevens tournaments to be completed in a day or a weekend. Many sevens tournaments have a competition for a cup, a plate, a bowl, and a shield, allowing many teams of different standards to avoid leaving empty-handed.

Sevens tournaments are traditionally known for having more of a relaxed atmosphere than fifteen-a-side games, and are often known as "festivals". Sevens tournaments gained their "popularity as an end of season diversion from the dourer and sterner stuff that provides the bulk of a normal season's watching." Fans frequently attend in fancy dress, and entertainment is put on for them.

The Hong Kong Sevens tournament has been especially important in popularising the game in Asia, and rugby sevens has been important as a form of international rugby "evangelism"; hence it is perhaps the most widely played form of the game, with tournaments in places as far apart as Bogota and Bangkok, Kuala Lumpur and Kenya, Singapore and Scandinavia, as well as the countries in which rugby union is well known.

== Laws ==
Sevens is played on a standard rugby union playing field. The field measures up to 100 metres (330 ft) long and 70 metres (230 ft) wide. On each goal line is an H-shaped goal.

=== Variations to the laws of the game ===
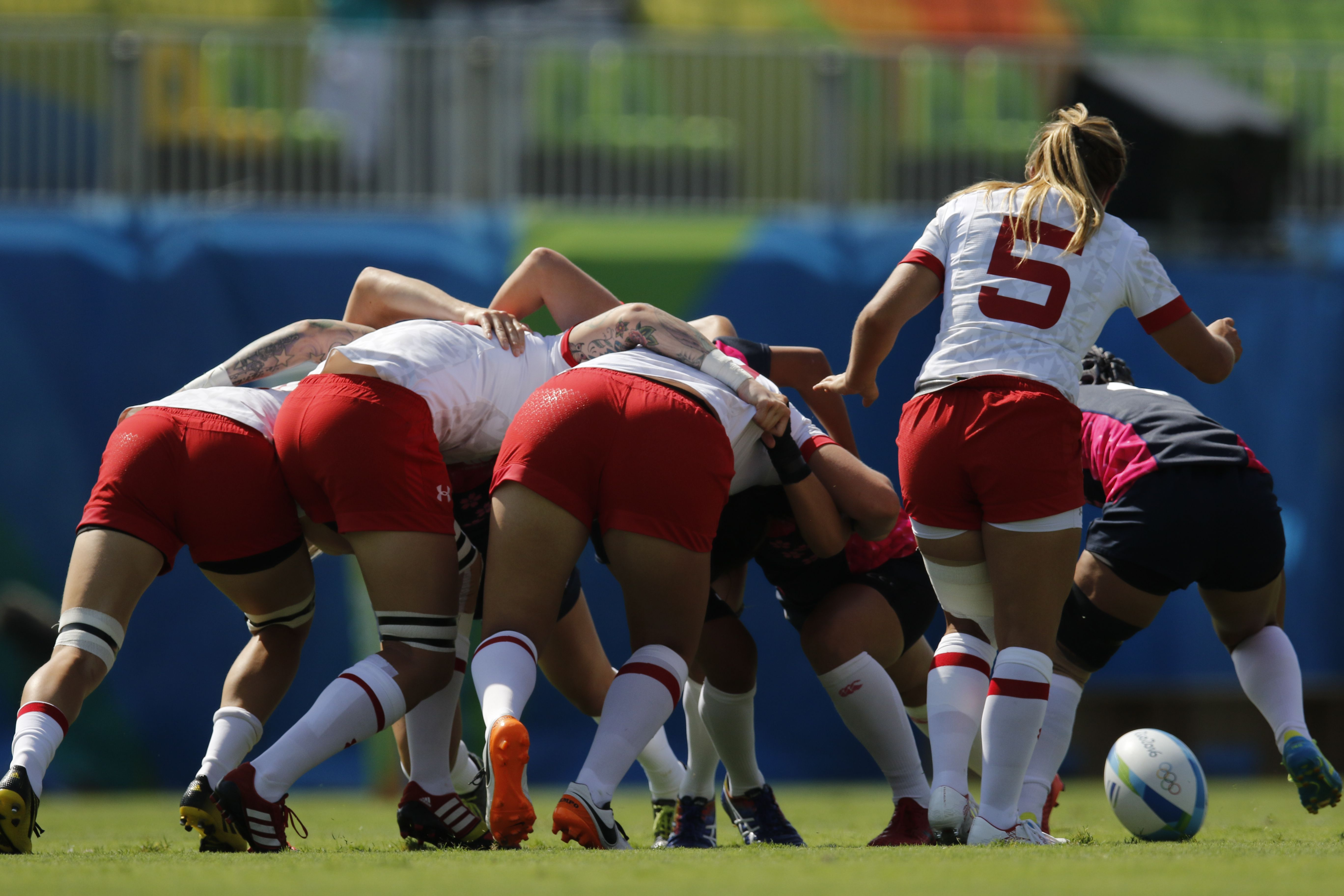
During a scrum in rugby sevens, three players from each team participate instead of eight.

There are several variations in laws which apply to rugby sevens, primarily to speed up the game and to account for the reduced number of players. The main changes can be summarised as follows:

- 7 players per team on field (instead of 15).
- Five substitutes, with five interchanges (instead of 8).
- Seven-minute halves (instead of 40-minute halves).
- Maximum of two minutes half-time (instead of ten minutes).
- Matches drawn after regulation are continued into golden point extra time, in multiple 5-minute periods.
- All conversion attempts must be drop-kicked (instead of having the option to place-kick).
- Conversions must be taken within 30 seconds of scoring a try (instead of 90 seconds). Prior to 2016, the limit was 40 seconds.
- Three player scrums (instead of eight players).
- Kick-offs: the team which has just scored kicks off, rather than the conceding team.
- Yellow cards net a 2-minute suspension (instead of 10 minutes) to the offender.
- Referees decide on advantage quickly (where one play usually ends advantage).
- In major competitions, there are additional officials present (in-goal touch judges) to judge success of kicks at goals, which means the game is not delayed waiting for touch judges to move into position to judge conversion attempts.

== Gameplay ==
=== Positions and gameplay ===
Teams are composed of seven players – three forwards and four backs. Scrums are made up of three players from each team. The chart below shows a team's typical formation at scrum time, with three forwards bound into the scrum, a scrum-half waiting to retrieve the ball once it exits the scrum, and three backs positioned to receive a pass. The numbers shown here are for illustrative purposes only. Unlike rugby fifteens, where a player's number corresponds to their position, numbering in rugby sevens is more flexible. In a squad of twelve players, the players will be numbered one through twelve. The starting players can have any of the twelve numbers, not necessarily one through seven. No set numbers differentiate positions; for example, numbers one through three are not reserved for forwards, but can be worn by any squad player.

Rugby sevens positions

1 Prop	2 Hooker	3 Prop
4 Scrum-half
5 Fly-half
6 Centre
7 Wing

- Forwards (blue)
  - 1 - Prop
  - 2 - Hooker
  - 3 - Prop
- Backs (red)
  - 4 - Scrum-half
  - 5 - Fly-half
  - 6 - Centre
  - 7 - Wing

In open play, a typical defensive formation involves a line of six defenders, with one sweeper behind the line. With the attacking team using all seven players against the defending team's six in the line, the attacking team often attempts to move the ball to create an overload. The defensive line can be put under pressure if the defending team makes a tackle and commits players to the ruck; with fewer players in the defending line, it leaves more space for the attacking team to exploit.

=== Pace of the game ===
Rugby sevens tends to be played at a faster pace than rugby fifteens. Because of the faster nature of the game, sevens players are often backs or loose forwards in fifteens rugby. The differences are most notable on game restarts. Because scrums in sevens involve three players forming one row instead of eight players forming three rows, scrums tend to assemble more quickly, require fewer restarts, and the ball exits the scrum more quickly. Penalties in sevens are generally taken with a quick tap, instead of a kick for touch and a line out, resulting in the ball being put back in play more quickly. When a player is tackled and a ruck is formed, the ball tends to exit the ruck more quickly, as the attacking team generally has only three players involved in the ruck – the tackled player, one support player, and one scrum-half.

== History ==
=== Origins ===
At Loretto School in Musselburgh, Scotland, the then headmaster Hely Hutchinson Almond got the schoolboys to play short-sided matches in the 1860s and 1870s. This was to improve the players' passing. A full rugby union match, at the time, was twenty-a-side and individualism was the style. Almond stated that he:

urged on his boys in the sixties that if only they would pass constantly and systematically to each other, they would baffle any side unaccustomed to such tactics.

Almond, a pioneer in collectivism in rugby union, struggled to get his schoolboys to get used to the system. The schoolboys stated this was 'funking'; but by 1872 he was organising eleven-a-side matches with Edinburgh Academicals. In 2007, Almond was nominated for the IRB Hall of Fame but was not inducted.

Collectivism did eventually take hold with new clubs, and Scotland exported it through Sevens around the world, and sides like New Zealand and South Africa quickly realised the benefits of collectivism. The bigger clubs in Scotland were reluctant to change their ways. They were winning, and could attract the best individualists from other clubs to maintain their position. In 1895 the Scottish Referee newspaper was still criticising West of Scotland for not using the collective method.

In England, the push for smaller sides eventually resulted in the formation of rugby league; and there was experimentation with numbers in the north of England prior to the split. There was a six-a-side tournament in Huddersfield in September 1879, played under regular rules but with 10 minute halves. Other tournaments were played over the next few years across the North before being replaced by a nine-a-side game. Matches attracted large crowds and raised thousands to support the clubs or local hospital charities. In August 1890, Yorkshire suspended 8 teams and in September Lancashire banned games with less than 15-a-side over allegations of professionalism; short sided games effectively ended in England.

==== Scotland ====
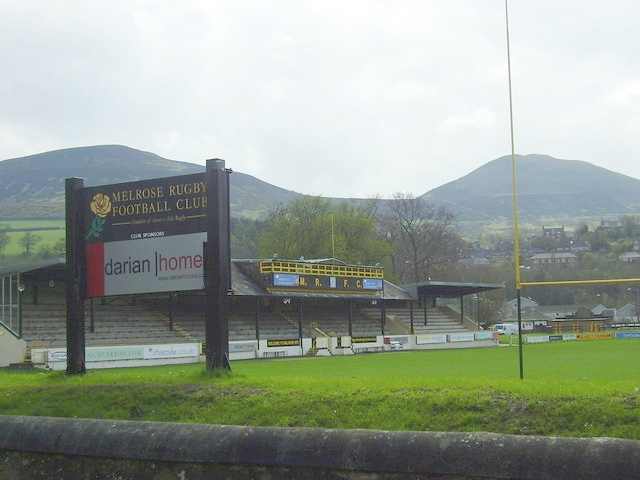
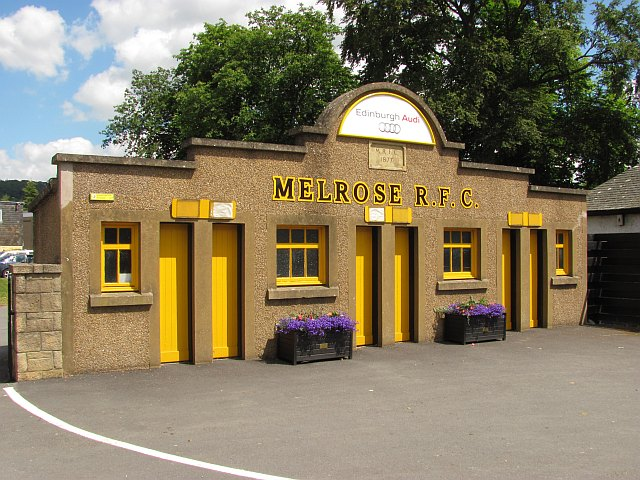
The Greenyards in Melrose, Scotland, was the site of the first rugby sevens game in 1883.

Rugby sevens was initially conceived in 1883 by Ned Haig and David Sanderson, who were butchers from Melrose, Scotland as a fund-raising event for their local club, Melrose RFC. The first-ever sevens match was played at The Greenyards, the Melrose ground, where it was well received. Two years later, Tynedale was the first non-Scottish club to win one of the Borders Sevens titles at Gala in 1885.

Rugby union sevens' popularity in the Borders spread north throughout Scotland:- Aberdeen hosting Sevens in 1889; Edinburgh hosting Sevens in 1896; Glasgow hosting Sevens in 1898; Dundee hosting Sevens in 1901. The popularity of Sevens exploded in the 1920s and 1930s. From the 19th century to today, over 150 Sevens tournaments in Scotland are known; and though some tournaments have folded; new tournaments continue to be born.

Sevens remain popular in Scotland; and the Melrose Sevens annually attracts around 12,000 spectators to the small Borders town. The Melrose Sevens centenary tournament in 1983 attracted 17,500 fans.

=== International spread ===
==== England ====
A rugby sevens tournament was played by St. Helens Cricket Club on 29 May 1886; and the final took place a week later. A rugby sevens tournament was organised by Warrington F.C. (a rugby club) on their athletics day on 14 August 1886 but it was not repeated. A rugby sevens match was played in Chorley, Lancashire as part of the Chorley Rugby and Athletic club's sports day on 22 July 1888; another match looks to have taken place the following year on 24 August 1889. The Rainford Athletics Club hosted a Sports Day on 7 August 1888 with a 3 team rugby sevens tournament, but this was a one-off and not repeated. Sevens then ended in England and it would be a long wait for any future English Sevens tournaments to arrive, with the exception of a Whitsuntide event, which included sevens, at Hexham in 1894 which seemed to go ahead without official backing. The Hexham Whitsuntide Sports committee tried to invite Hawick RFC as their star guests, but without backing this did not come off.

For a long time the English Rugby Union held against rugby sevens being played in England. English clubs, particularly those close to the Scottish border and aware of the game's success in Scotland, wanted to play their own tournaments. Their pleas went in vain.

England finally hosted its first Sevens tournament in 1921 as the Scottish game crept south over the border. This was on 23 April 1921 by Carlisle rugby club; they beat a Hawick 'B' side in the final. Next was on 3 September 1921 in north east England at the Percy Park Sevens (now known as the 1872 Sevens) in North Shields, widely understood as the first international sevens tournament. It was close to the Scottish Borders and Scottish sides were invited to play in the tournament with local English sides. The final was contested between Selkirk and Melrose; with Selkirk winning the event.

First played in 1926, the Middlesex Sevens were set up by Dr J.A. Russell-Cargill, a London-based Scot. The tournament was intended as a fundraiser for King Edward VII Hospital. It raised £1,600; at a time when standard admission was a shilling, and stand seats cost five shillings. This became England's premier Sevens tournament:- it had some formidable figures on its sub-committee such as Wavell Wakefield and Bill Ramsay; it was close to London – and 10,000 spectators attended the second Middlesex tournament; and it helped rugby in London develop – featuring the aforementioned Wavell Wakefield, Carl Aarvold (later Recorder of the City of London) of Blackheath FC, Wick Powell of London Welsh RFC, and John Tallent, who would later become chairman of the Four Home Unions Tours Committee. Invitation sides graced the Sevens tournament:- such as Sale RFC in 1936, which included such players as Wilf Wooller and Claude Davey of Wales and Ken Fyfe of Scotland amongst their backs; and in 1939, Cardiff RFC, which included players such as Wilf Wooller again, and Les Spence and Wendy Davis.

==== India ====
The Earl of Dalhousie became Governor-General of India in the middle of the nineteenth century. He took his summers in the Indian western Himalayas. His base there, also called Dalhousie, and the neighbouring Khajjiar region, remains known as a 'Little Scotland of India'. Teams from Dalhousie and Chamba played various sports against one another at the Khajjiar Gymkhana. The Chamba side was a mixed civilian and native side; the Dalhousie side was a military side. On 29 June 1886 at 1am they played a rugby sevens match, as the Dalhousie players favoured rugby union; and the Chamba players, that had already beaten Dalhousie in cricket and association football, confidently obliged. The Dalhousie side unsurprisingly won the match; with the report from the Civil & Military Gazette seeming to blame Chamba's native players for the loss.

==== New Zealand ====
Sevens then spread from Scotland to Dunedin; a Scottish expatriate city in New Zealand. The first Dunedin Sevens tournament was the Charity tournament in aid of Dunedin hospital on 28 September 1889. From Dunedin, sevens spread north to Christchurch where Canterbury Rugby Union held a Sevens tournament on 16 September 1893. On 23 May 1894, sevens had almost reached the North Island with a tournament in Nelson.

==== Australia ====
The first notice of a Sevens tournament in Australia is that of Central Queensland Rugby Union's tournament in Rockhampton on 4 July 1891. The Wanderers won the tournament beating the Waratahs and the Berserkers.

==== Ireland ====
In Ireland, Douglas RFC of Cork in the South of Ireland attempted to host a Sevens tournament on 8 December 1900. However, due to inclement weather this did not come off. The first Sevens tournament in Ireland was then the Belfast tournament of 30 April 1921 in aid of the Warriors Day fund. This was run by the northern branch of the IRFU.

==== Argentina ====
The next country to host a Sevens tournament was Argentina; arriving again via Scottish expatriates. The Buenos Aires Cricket & Rugby Club hosted their own Sevens event on 9 July 1921. The Buenos Aires club defeated Belgrano Athletic Club in the final. The Buenos Aires club went on to host Sevens tournaments on 9 July every year; however, a pitch-invasion tradition at the final meant that no further winners were recorded until 1937. The 9 July is Argentina's Independence Day holiday; and a feast is often prepared in celebration. It is said that the pitch invasion tradition started when a bell, announcing that food was ready, rang out during the final.

=== National side tournaments ===
==== First international tournament ====
The first-ever officially sanctioned tournament for national teams was the 1973 International Seven-A-Side Tournament held at Murrayfield as part of the "Scottish Rugby Union's Celebration of Rugby" centenary celebrations.

==== Hong Kong Sevens ====
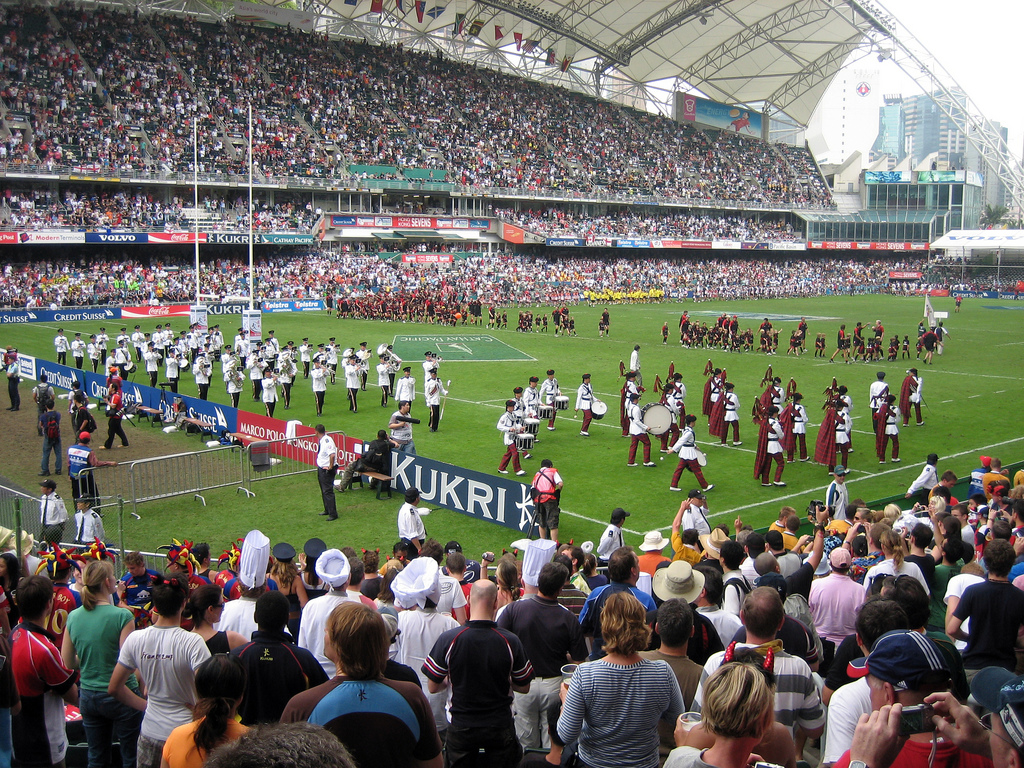
The Hong Kong Sevens was one of the most influential tournaments in the development and spread of rugby sevens internationally in the 20th century.

Due to the success of the format, the Scottish connection continued in the establishment of the Hong Kong Sevens in the 1970s. Founded largely by expats such as "Tokkie" Smith, the Hong Kong Sevens were ahead of their time and an influential force in the modernisation of rugby union. For example, the Hong Kong Sevens was one of the first rugby union tournaments to attract major sponsorship when the airline Cathay Pacific sponsored the inaugural tournament in 1976. They also provided a level of cosmopolitan international competition, which tended not to exist in rugby before the first Rugby World Cup in 1987, especially since Hong Kong was not seen as one of the "Big Eight". By 1986, the Hong Kong Sevens were held up as a positive example to others, although many of the smaller nations' teams were largely made up of expatriates.

==== World Cup ====
The Rugby World Cup Sevens, in which the Melrose Cup is contested, was launched in 1993.

=== International development ===
Rugby sevens continues to be popular in the Scottish Borders, where the ten most prestigious tournaments make up a league competition known as the Kings of the Sevens. In honour of the role of Melrose RFC in the creation of rugby sevens, the club was inducted, along with Haig, to the IRB Hall of Fame in 2008. Top club sides and international sides frequently enter the Sevens tournaments in Scotland; the Melrose Sevens, as the founding event of the sport, being the most prestigious.

Sevens has also taken strong root in the Pacific island nations of Fiji, Tonga, and Samoa, as well as in Kenya. In many minor rugby nations, such as in Poland, development has tended to concentrate on rugby sevens as a means of introducing the sport to people. Rugby sevens has become popular in places such as Hong Kong, Singapore and Dubai, which are not so successful in the fifteen-a-side code. In addition, seven of the 15 current "core teams" that compete in all legs of the World Series represent nations that are not within the recognised top tier of the 15-man game – Fiji, Samoa, Kenya, the United States, Canada, Portugal, and Japan. Recently there has been the introduction of many new teams to the sevens circuit such as Russia and Germany.

=== Rugby league sevens ===
Rugby league also has a long heritage in the seven-a-side game. The world record rugby league crowd for sevens was 80,000 in Roundhay Park, Leeds, 1932, before a royal audience. In the modern era, however, small-sided rugby league has concentrated on the Nines format, which boasts similar adaptations to the league code as sevens does with the union code.

Both Bradford and Wigan rugby league sides have defeated rugby union teams in major rugby union sevens tournaments, demonstrating the adaptability of rugby league players generally.

== Major tournaments ==
=== World Rugby Sevens Series ===
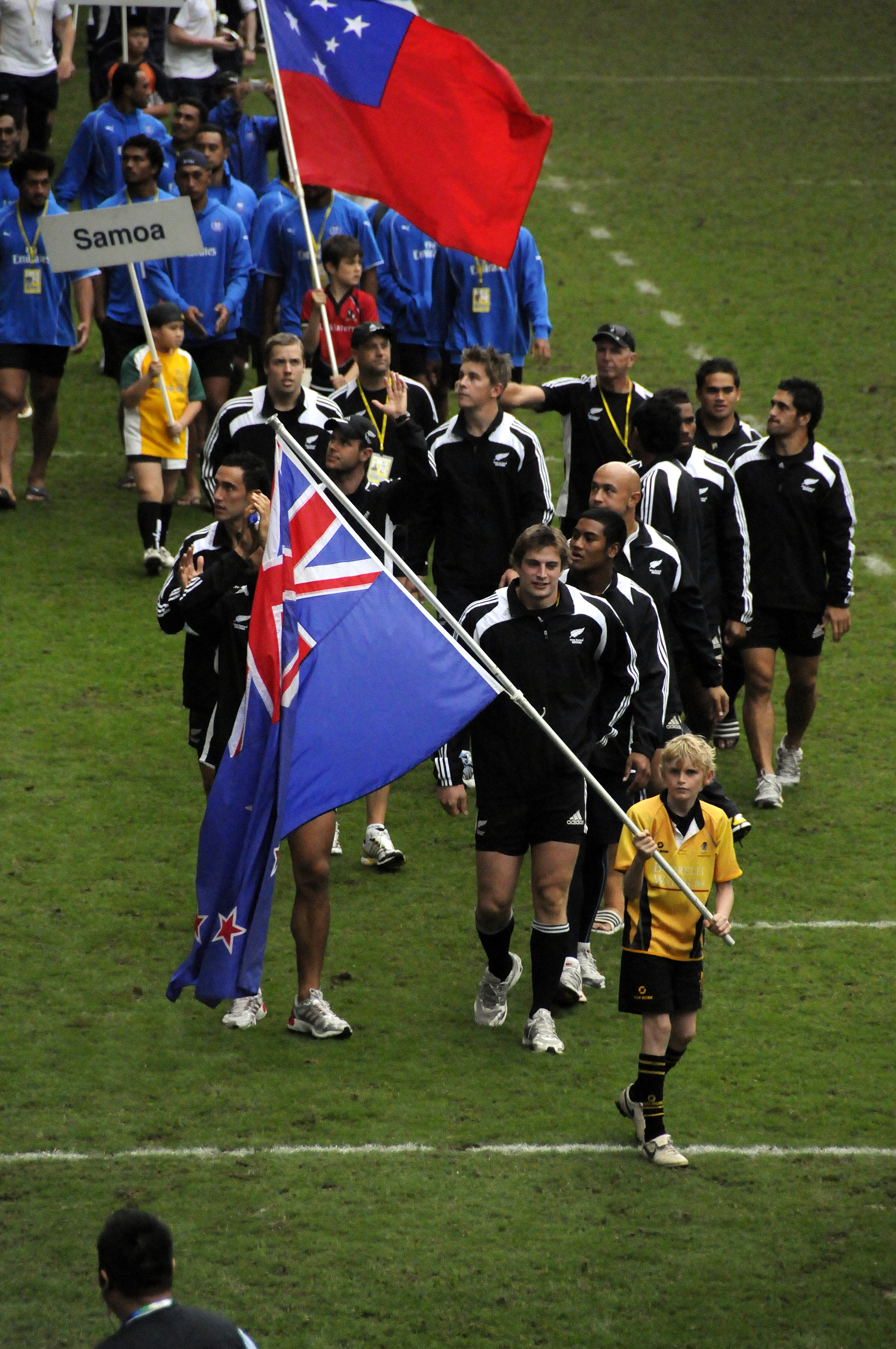
New Zealand have won thirteen World Rugby Sevens Series titles; the most of any nation that has competed in the annual series of tournaments.

The World Series was a series held every season since the 1999–2000 inaugural season. Each season the Sevens Series held from seven to eleven tournaments, from around October and concluding around June. Most tournaments see 16 teams competing – mostly "core teams" that participate in each event, but also some teams that win the right to participate in select events. The last tournament was held in the 2022–2023 season.

New Zealand has been the dominant force in the Sevens Series, winning 13 out of the 23 seasons, including the first six seasons from 1999–2000 to 2004–05. In recent years, however, several other teams have challenged New Zealand's dominance. Fiji won the Series in 2005–06 and again in 2014–15 and 2015–16; South Africa won in 2008–09 and 2016–17; and Samoa claimed the 2009–10 crown. Other strong contenders include England and Australia, each of whom have had several top four finishes in recent seasons. The 2015 London Sevens, saw the United States win their first-ever tournament in the World Series.

Notable World Series players include England's Dan Norton, who has scored more tries (>230) than any other player; and England's Ben Gollings, who has scored more points (2,652) than any other player.

=== World Rugby Women's Sevens Series ===
The Rugby Women's Sevens Series was held every season since the 2012–13 inaugural season. Each season the Sevens Series held from five to six tournaments, usually starting around November and concluding around June. Most tournaments see 12 teams competing – mostly "core teams" that participate in each event, but also some teams that win the right to participate in select events. The last series was held in the 2022–2023 season

New Zealand have been the most dominant team in the series since its establishment by winning four of the six competitions held up to and including 2018.

=== SVNS ===
In 2023, World Rugby re-branded the Sevens series to a new World Rugby SVNS Series (known for sponsorship reasons as the HSBC SVNS). World Rugby announced it will fully combine the men’s and women’s tours aligning with the Olympic competition model, with both taking place on the same weekends in the same cities and venues starting in December 2023 in Dubai and will conclude in Madrid in June 2024. The idea is to bring about a festival type atmosphere in each city across the world. Both men and women's teams will earn the same with equal participation fees. The new format will showcase the twelve best men's and women's teams, which will conclude in a Grand Final weekend where the top eight teams will compete to be crowned Series champions. The teams ranked ninth to twelfth will compete against the top four teams from a new Challenger Series in a relegation play-off to see who secures their place in the 2024–2025 season.

=== Summer Olympics ===
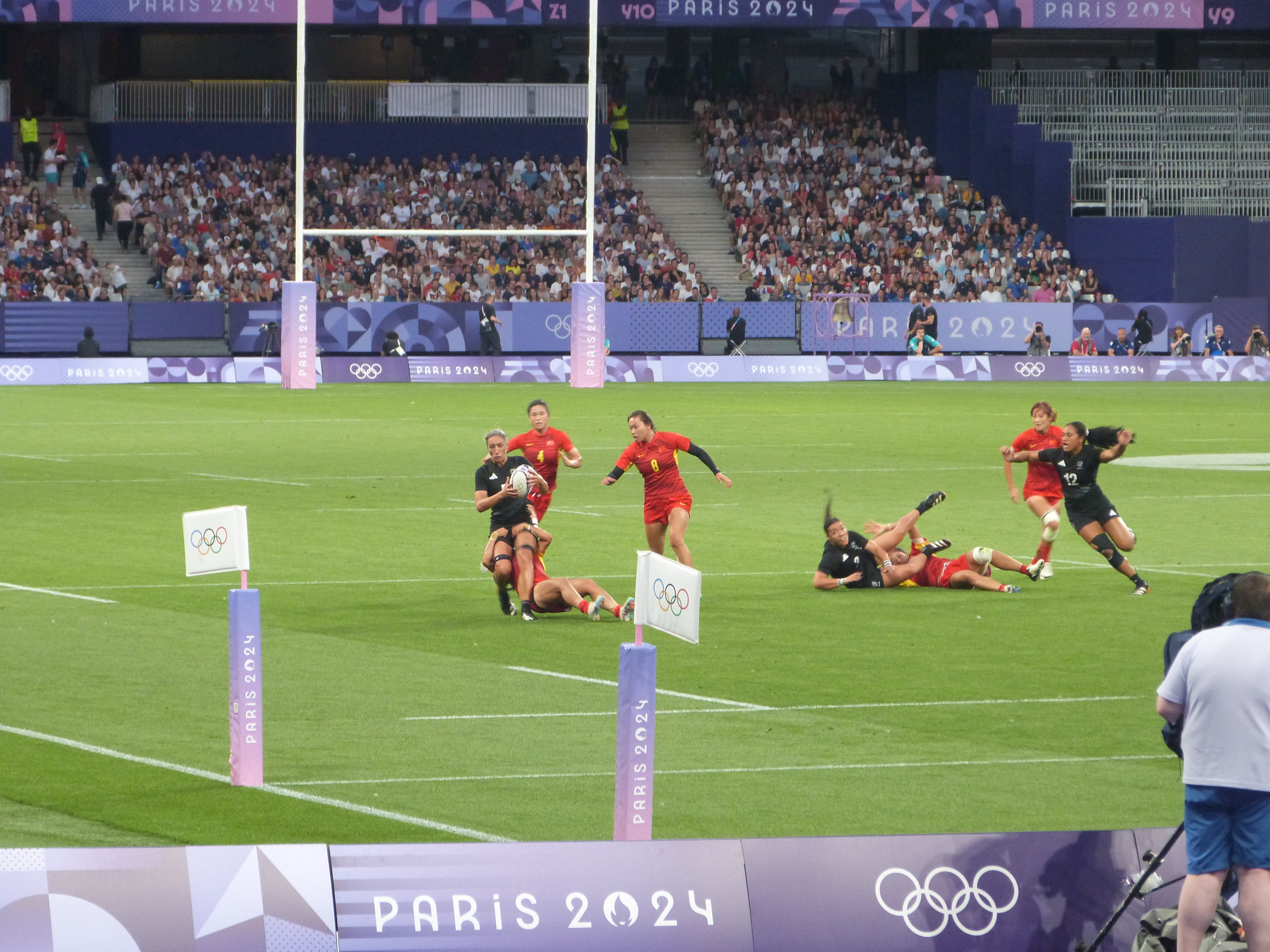
New Zealand captain Sarah Hirini is chased down during a match against China at the 2024 Summer Olympics.

The International Olympic Committee voted in 2009 to include rugby sevens on the program for the 2016 Olympic Games in Rio de Janeiro, Brazil. There were two open spots for sports and initially seven sports began the bidding for inclusion in the 2016 program. The event debuted in an Olympic program at the 2014 Summer Youth Olympics.

Two issues related to differences between the structures of rugby union and the Olympics were sorted out before the 2016 Olympic Games. The issue of a combined British team has proven less of a problem in rugby union. World Rugby chief executive Mike Miller endorsed the concept of a combined British sevens team in 2011 for the 2016 Olympics and beyond. Another issue is the status of Northern Ireland. World Rugby recognises the Irish Rugby Football Union as the sport's governing body for the entire island of Ireland. By contrast, the International Olympic Committee recognises the British Olympic Association as the governing body of the UK Olympic team, while the Olympic Council of Ireland usually fields teams representing all of Ireland in sports which are organised on an all-Ireland basis. Northern Irish sevens players play for the Irish team.

In the men's competition Fiji won the gold medal in the sport's Olympic debut, with Great Britain taking the silver and South Africa the bronze. The women's gold medal was won by Australia, with New Zealand taking silver and Canada bronze.

=== World Cup Sevens ===
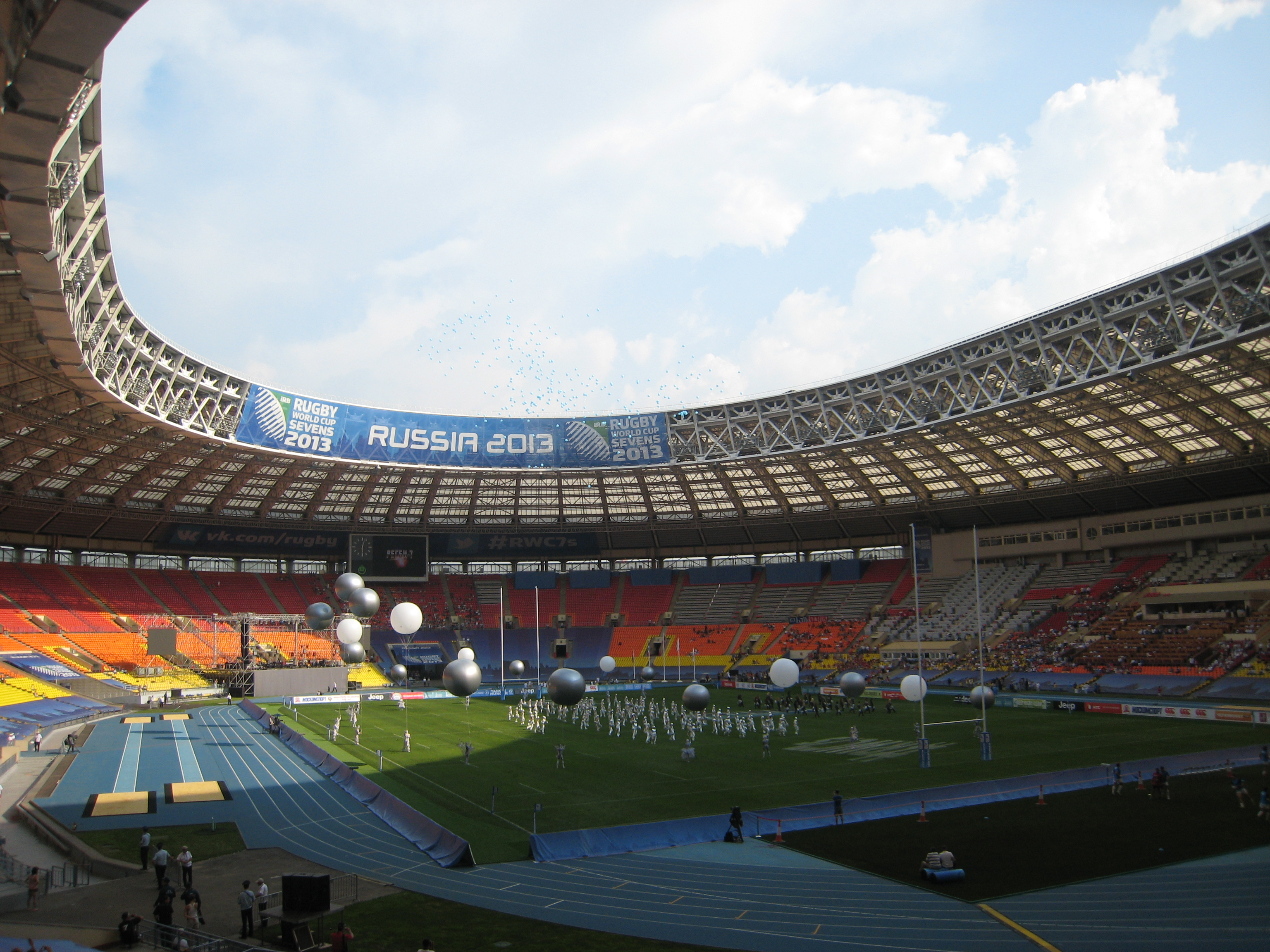
A scene from the opening ceremony of the 2013 Rugby World Cup Sevens, which was held at Luzhniki Stadium in Moscow, Russia.

The Rugby World Cup Sevens is held every four years and is the premier international rugby sevens tournament outside of the Olympic Games. The first tournament was held at Murrayfield in 1993 with England becoming the first team to win the event. Fiji and New Zealand are the most successful, with Fiji winning two World Cups and New Zealand winning three World Cups. In the men's competition teams compete for the Melrose Cup and in the women's competition, launched in 2009, teams compete for the Women's Rugby World Cup Sevens Trophy.

Beginning with the 2018 edition, which was held in San Francisco, United States, the World Cup Sevens is held in the middle of the Summer Olympic cycle, two years after each Olympics. As part of the drive to include Sevens as an Olympic sport, World Rugby proposed ending the World Cup event entirely to ensure the Olympic event had the greatest prestige. However, following feedback, World Rugby and the IOC recognised the benefit to keeping the typically much larger World Cup event (24 teams), but to align it timewise with the more streamlined Olympic tournament (12 to 16 teams).

=== Commonwealth Games ===
Rugby sevens has been played at each of the Commonwealth Games every four years since its first appearance at the 1998 Commonwealth Games in Kuala Lumpur, Malaysia and was the first major international multisports event to include the sport. Rugby sevens is a "Core" sport by the Commonwealth Games Federation, necessitating its appearance at all future games. The New Zealand team has won the gold medal four times with South Africa winning the tournament at Glasgow 2014 beating the defending champions in the final. Through the 2014 Games in Glasgow, it was the last remaining male-only sport at the Commonwealth Games, after women's boxing was added for those Games. Women's sevens made its Commonwealth Games debut in the 2018 Games. The New Zealand teams won the gold medal in both the men's and women's competitions.

== Regional tournaments ==
Rugby sevens is played at various regional multi-sport competitions, including the Asian Games and the Pacific Games. Rugby union was formerly played at the World Games, but this has ceased as rugby is now an Olympic sport.

=== Asian Games ===
A men's rugby sevens was introduced at the Asian Games in 1998. A women's tournament was added in 2010.

=== Pan American Games ===
Men's rugby sevens at the Pan American Games has been held every four years since the 2011 Pan American Games, with Canada, Argentina, and the United States placing for medals each time. Women's rugby sevens was later added to the program for the 2015 Pan American Games.

=== European Sevens Championship ===
The Rugby Europe Sevens Grand Prix Series serves as a regional qualifier for two types of tournaments. The top two finishing teams each year who are not core members of the World Rugby Sevens Series advance to the Hong Kong Sevens, the qualifying tournament for teams vying to achieve core team status in the World Rugby Sevens Series. The Europe Grand Prix also serves as a regional qualifier for major quadrennial tournaments, such as the summer Olympics and the Rugby World Cup Sevens.

In Europe, Portugal dominated in sevens during the Championship era (2002–10); only twice the team did not win the trophy, in 2007 and 2009, when both times the championships were won by Russia. In the Grand Prix Series era from 2011 to the present, the champions became England and France; both teams won the trophy twice in a row. Portugal won the first edition, while France is the current (2025) champion.

=== Premier Rugby Sevens ===
Premier Rugby Sevens is a standalone, professional rugby sevens circuit based in North America and sanctioned by USA Rugby as the highest level of domestic sevens. The league began play in 2021 and has been scheduled opposite to the World Rugby Sevens Series in order to feature top American and other international caliber players.

== Women's rugby sevens ==
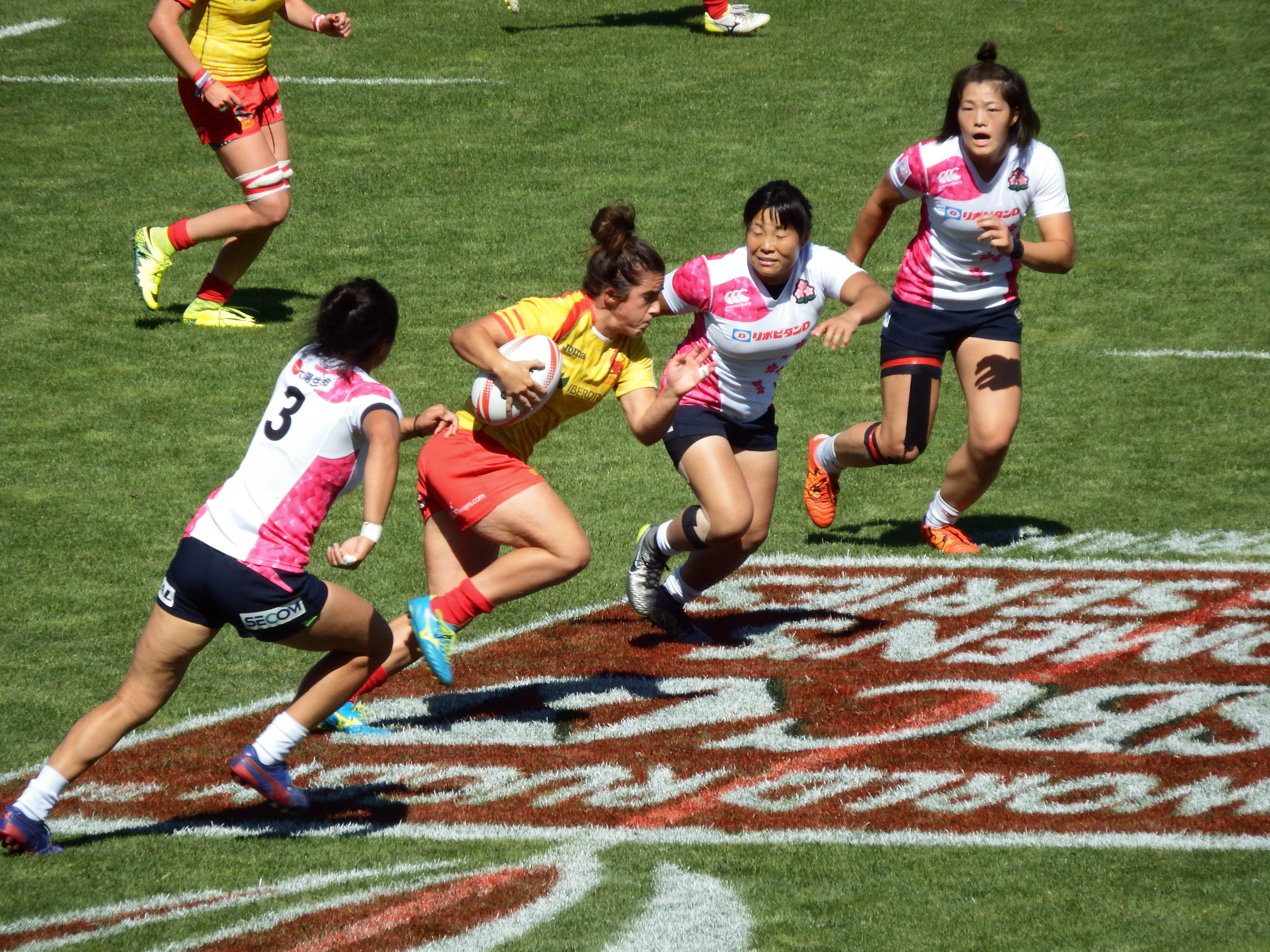
Patricia García of Spain breaks through Japan's defensive line during the Challenge Cup Final of the 2017 France Women's Sevens tournament.

Women's rugby sevens has been dominated by New Zealand, with either the New Zealand team (1999–2001) or Aotearoa Maori Women's Rugby sevens team (playing as New Zealand), winning the annual Hong Kong Sevens tournament from 1997 until 2007. The United States won the Hong Kong Sevens in 2008 by defeating Canada in the final (New Zealand failed to send a team).

The inaugural Women's Rugby World Cup Sevens tournament took place in Dubai together with the men's tournament during the first weekend of March 2009. England defeated Canada 12–0 in the Bowl final while Australia edged New Zealand 15–10 in extra-time to become the first to win the Women's Rugby World Cup.

WR, then known as the International Rugby Board (IRB), organised its first official women's sevens tournament outside of the World Cup as part of the 2011 Dubai Sevens. This was part of a plan to launch a full IRB International Women's Sevens Series for 2012–13. The international series was officially christened as the IRB Women's Sevens World Series in an IRB announcement on 4 October 2012. The series, as planned, launched for the 2012–13 season and initially featured events in Dubai, the US, China and the Netherlands. Two additional events were planned for the 2013–14 series, but in the end only one of these events, in Brazil, took place. For the 2014–15 series, China dropped from the schedule, while Canada and England hosted new events. The series was rechristened for 2014–15 as the World Rugby Women's Sevens Series, following the November 2014 renaming of the IRB as World Rugby. The 2015–16 series included only five events; the England and Netherlands events were dropped and an event in France was added. The 2016–17 series returned to six events with the launch of an event in Japan.

Women's rugby sevens was included in the 2016 Olympic Games due to the IRB's successful bid to reintroduce rugby to the Summer games. Australia claimed the gold medal for the event, beating New Zealand in the final with a score of 24–17. Canada claimed the bronze medal after beating Great Britain 33–10 in the third place play-off. WR also successfully pushed for the inclusion of women's sevens in the 2018 Commonwealth Games.

Many of the Scottish Sevens club tournaments run women's events as part of their Sevens.

== Sevens vs Fifteens ==
As sevens has proven a commercial and competitive success, sevens is starting to become divorced from the 15-man game. Former Wales rugby union player and current pundit John Taylor wrote in 2010, stating:

[Sevens] is in danger of becoming a totally separate game. Ben Ryan, who coached both the England Sevens and the Fiji Sevens, dismisses the idea that it should be seen mainly as a development tool. A few years ago players would spend a year or two with the Sevens squad to improve their running and passing skills. Many international players refined their game on the Sevens circuit including all-time greats such as Jonah Lomu. That is happening less and less. Players have to make a choice: Do they want to concentrate on Sevens or 15s? The techniques and training required are becoming very different. Modern professional players are already pretty lean but the forwards in 15-a-side do need bulk as well. In Sevens that is not required and new training regimes are making body fat levels even lower so they are not able to transfer from one game to the other.

== See also ==
- Rugby X
- Tag Rugby
  - Mini rugby
  - American Flag Rugby
- Beach rugby
- Touch rugby
- Rugby tens
- Rugby league sevens
- Seven-a-side football (association football)
