= ITRA =

ITRA may refer to:

- Irish Tag Rugby Association
- International Trail Running Association
- Institute of Teaching and Research in Ayurveda
