= Flag football =

Variant of American football

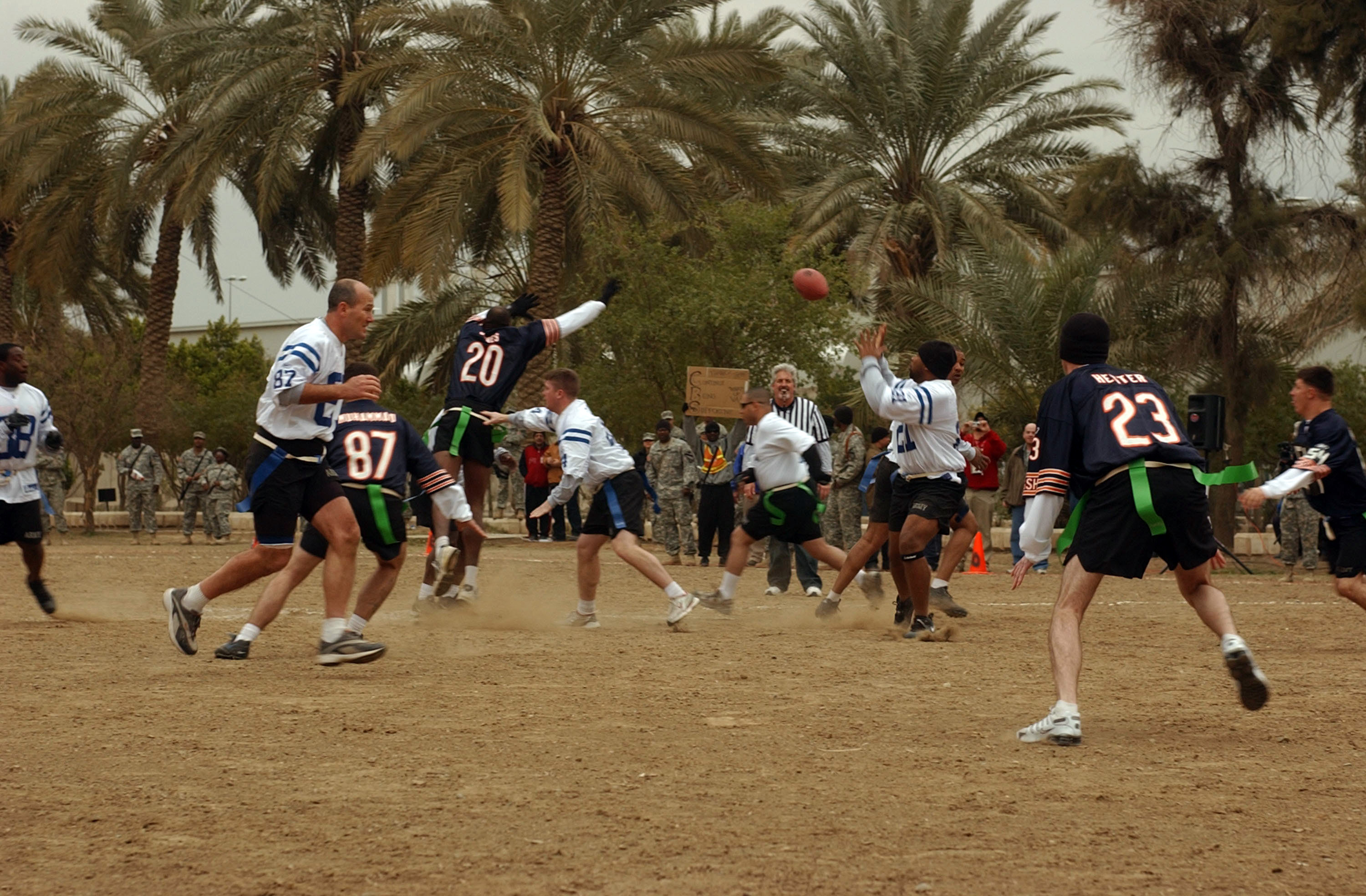
- A game of flag football being played by US Army soldiers in Iraq
- Highest governing body: International Federation of American Football; International Woman's Flag Football Association
- First played: c. 1940 in Fort Meade, Maryland, U.S.

Characteristics
- Contact: Limited
- Team members: Two teams of 4-10
- Type: Team sport; ball game
- Equipment: Ball, flag
- Venue: Football field

Presence
- Country or region: Worldwide
- Olympic: To be first included in 2028
- World Games: since 2022

Flag football or flag gridiron is a variant of gridiron football (American football or Canadian football depending on location) where, instead of tackling players to the ground, the defensive team must remove a flag or flag belt from the ball carrier ("deflagging") to end a down. In flag football, contact is limited between players. The sport has a strong amateur following with several national and international competitions each year sponsored by various associations but is most popularly played in America where it was invented. The international governing body for the sport is the International Federation of American Football (IFAF) with the International Woman's Flag Football Association (IWFFA) governing the women's game.

Flag football will be a discretionary event for the 2028 Summer Olympics in Los Angeles, the first time any gridiron football code has been a full part of an Olympic program.

== History ==
The best available records to date point to the early 1940s during World War II as the sport's starting point. The game began as a recreational sport created for American military personnel to help them stay fit but was designed in a way that would help prevent them from becoming injured during wartime. At the time it was called "Touch and Tail football", which then became "flag football" after the war ended.

The first known recorded history of flag football can be traced to Fort Meade, Maryland, USA, which is now generally accepted as the sport's birthplace. The first national flag football organization, the National Touch Football League (NTFL), was formed in the 1960s in St. Louis, Missouri. Since 1971, the league has had a national championship game. Arizona teachers Porter Wilson and Norman Adams invented flag-a-tag belts and flags which are the template for the flags used in the game today.

The first intercollegiate Flag Football National Tournament took place in 1979 at the University of New Orleans. The winning team was the Humps, from the University of Central Florida. Today, flag football takes place on college campuses around the country, governed by the NIRSA Flag Football Rules Book and takes the form of Intramural Sports and Club Competition.

The International Federation of Flag Football (IFFF) was established in 2000 by Jim Zimolka, then-publisher of FlagMag magazine and, according to The New York Times, "one of the best [flag football] players in the country". The IFFF organized the annual World Cup of Flag Football and its regional qualifying tournaments, offering multiple categories for men, women, and youth, as well as nine-man, eight-man, seven-man, and four-man versions of the game. The United States mainly won the men's competitions while Mexico dominated on the women's side.

Two years after the inaugural 2000 IFFF World Cup of Flag Football held in Cancún, the International Federation of American Football (IFAF) organized the inaugural IFAF Flag Football World Championships in 2002.

Following increased concerns of concussions and CTE in American football in the 2000s and 2010s alongside a decline in youth American Football participation during the same period the NFL has spent considerable resources in promoting flag football as an alternative to tackle football for men and women. Efforts by the league related to this include the creation of the NFL Flag which sponsors youth flag football leagues in the U.S. and flag football games being played at the Pro Bowl Games. The NFL has also announced and approved a future professional flag football league for men and women, sponsored the sport's inclusion in the 2022 World Games, was involved in its push to be included in the 2028 Summer Olympics, and in a partnership with the NAIA helped add flag football as a varsity sport for female student-athletes.

== Basic rules ==
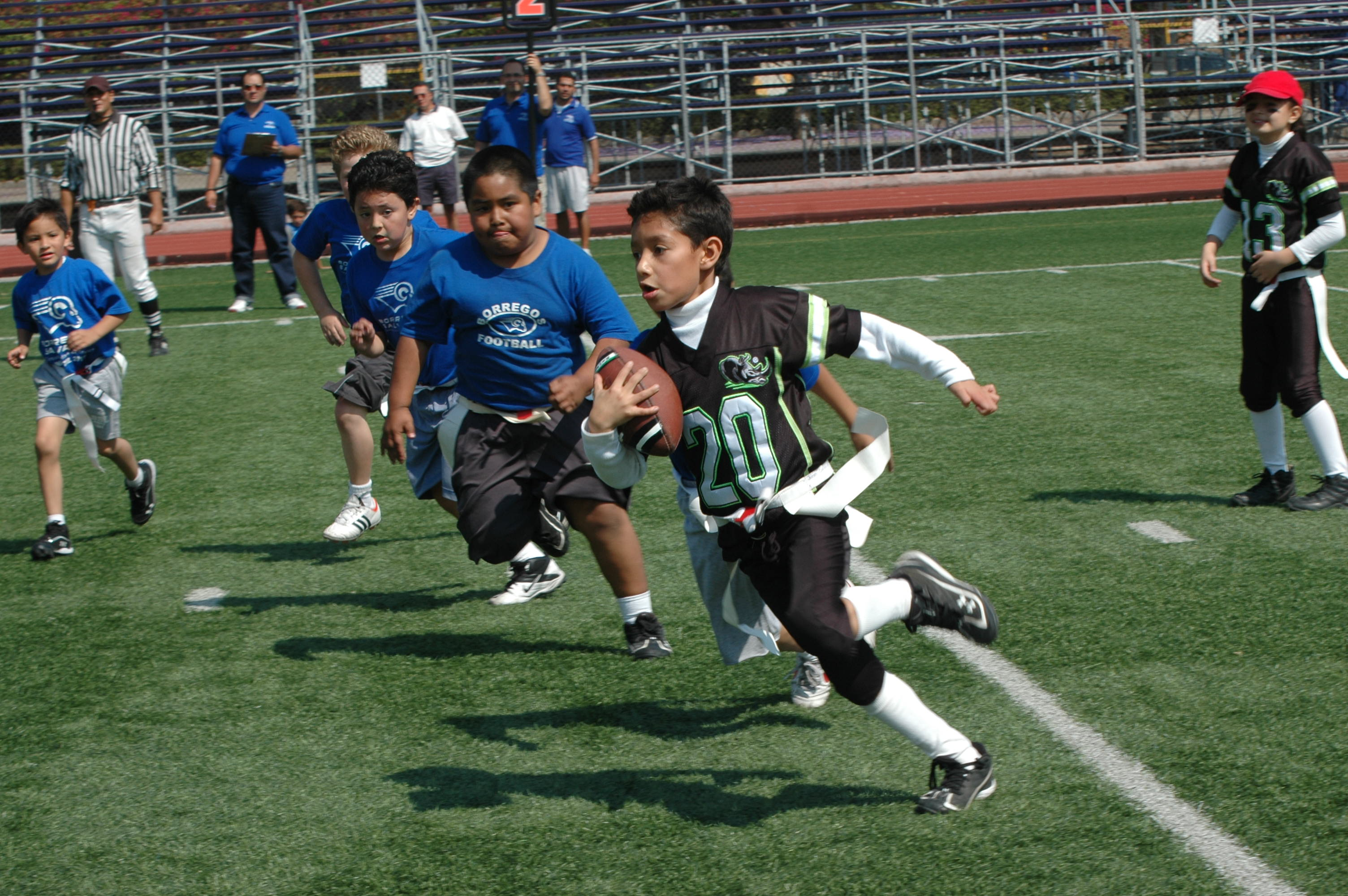
Children playing the sport in Mexico

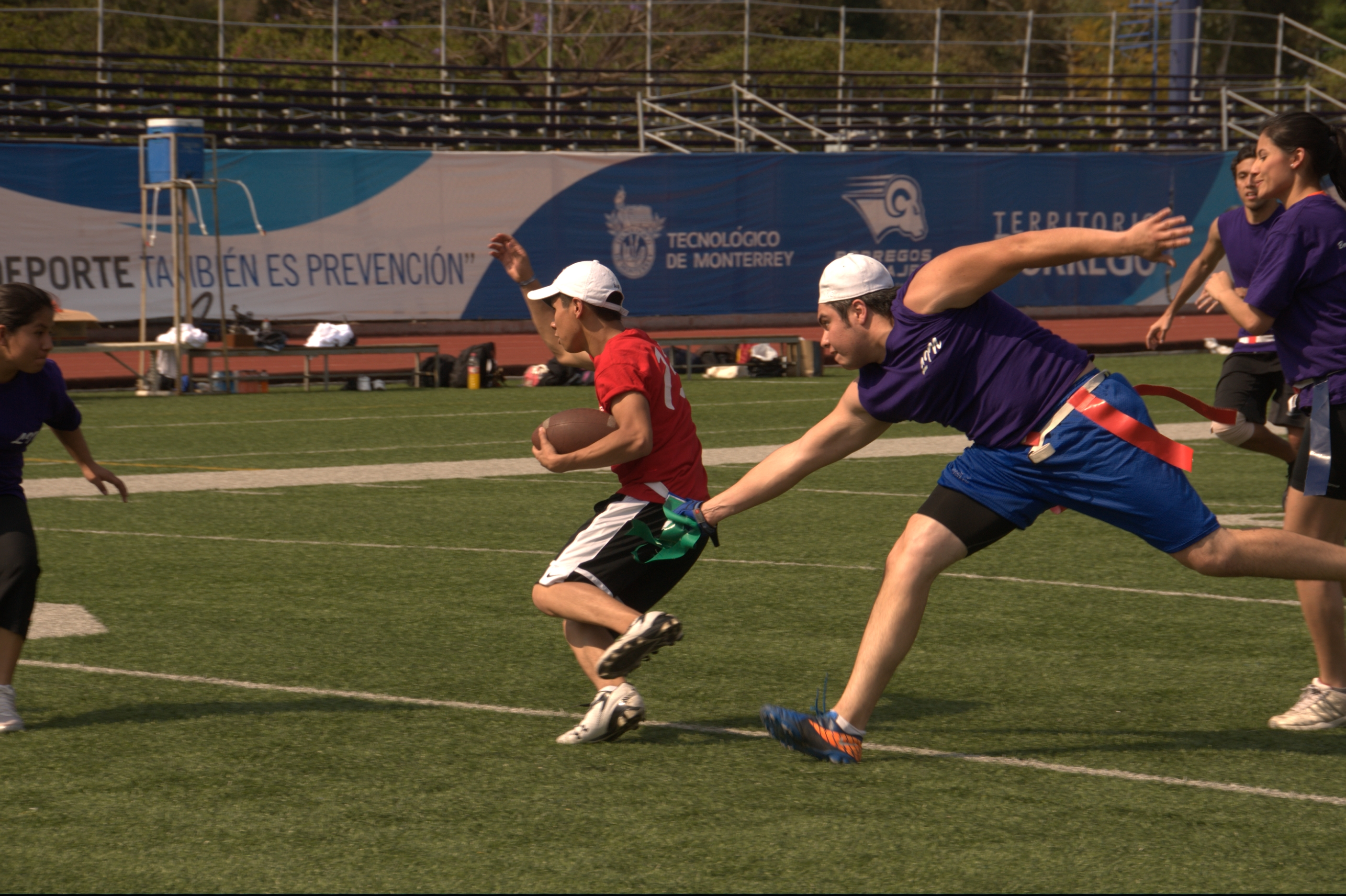
Player at the point of taking other player's flag at a game at Monterrey Institute of Technology and Higher Education, Mexico City

The specific rules of flag football vary widely by league, though all share in common their replication of the rules of traditional American football with tackling replaced by flag-pulling.

Traditional American football rules are often eliminated or modified to reflect the more recreational nature of the game, the desire to avoid physical contact and injury, and the generally smaller number of participating players per side.

In a standard game of flag football, the match is played in two halves. Time length is determined by the league being played. The clock only stops for injuries, half-time and timeouts. Most leagues have 10 players per team, 5 on offense and 5 on defense; there is no punting team for flag football.

== Variations ==
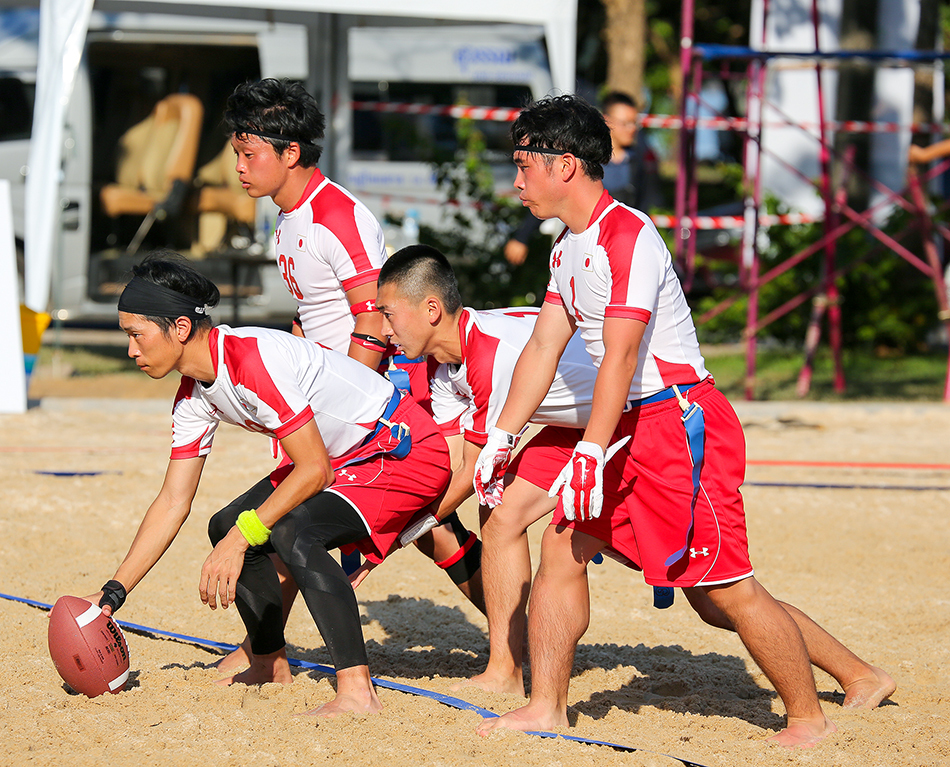
Flag football is sometimes played on sand.

Chiefly, because there is no dominant sanctioning organization for the sport, the game has mutated into many variations: 9, 8, 7, 6, 5, and 4 players on each side; coed or single-gender; with kicking and punting and with point-after conversions (including some with 1, 2, and 3 point tries) or without; and field sizes that vary from full Canadian Football League (CFL) size, National Football League (NFL) size (120 yards long by 53 1/3 yards wide), to fields a third that size.

An important distinction is whether linemen are allowed to catch passes ("Eligible Linemen") or, as in the NFL / CFL, are not allowed to do so ("Ineligible Linemen"). Flag (and touch) football may also be divided into "contact" or "non-contact", depending on whether or not blocking is allowed; if allowed, blocking is usually restricted to the chest.

The ability or inability of the quarterback to advance the ball past the line of scrimmage (LOS) by running is another rule subject to variation by the league.

The sport is also played on surfaces other than a traditional grass football field, including on sand beaches; beach flag football has previously featured as a discipline at the Asian Beach Games.

== International tournaments ==
=== IFAF Flag Football World Championship ===
The International Federation of American Football (IFAF) organise a biannual IFAF Flag Football World Championship.

=== Olympics ===
In July 2022, the National Football League (NFL) and the IFAF partnered on a bid for flag football to be included as an optional event during the 2028 Summer Olympics in Los Angeles. The NFL had sponsored the inclusion of flag football as an invitational event during that month's 2022 World Games. The NFL's executive VP of football operations Troy Vincent stated that the sport was "the future of American football", as it was inclusive and had fewer barriers to access. Flag football was shortlisted as one of nine sports advancing to the next phase of the bid process. In October 2023, the LA organizing committee proposed the inclusion of flag football as an event, which was officially approved at the 141st IOC Session.

=== World Games ===
Flag football has been contested at the World Games—a multi-sport event featuring sports and disciplines not currently contested at the Olympics—since the 2022 World Games in Birmingham, Alabama. The 2022 World Games featured men's and women's tournaments, which were won by the United States and Mexico respectively. Flag football returned for the 2025 World Games in Chengdu, China; only a women's tournament was held.

=== International Flag Football Festival ===
The International Flag Football Festival (IFFF) organizes the World Cup of Flag Football featuring teams from the United States, Mexico and several other nations.

=== Kelly McGillis Classic ===
The Kelly McGillis Classic is a women's tournament organised by the IWFFA held each February in Key West, Florida where over 90 women and girls teams participate in 8-on-8, semi-blocking contact flag football.

== United States ==
=== USA Football ===
USA Football is the governing body of American football in the United States, the sole US member of the International Federation of American Football, and a recognized sports organization of the US Olympic & Paralympic Committee. Its non-profit mission includes designing and delivering premier educational, development, and competitive programs for American football, including tackle and flag football. USA Football is the only organization that selects and organizes the U.S. national team (men's and women's) in federation-sanctioned international competition.

=== USA Flag ===
USA Flag currently operates the largest National Championships flag football tournament in the United States, along with a club World Championships every January in Florida that eclipsed over 980 teams this past January 2023, the largest single weekend flag football tournament ever recorded. The USA Flag has grown exponentially each year.

=== NIRSA ===
NIRSA is the leader in collegiate recreation and a professional association for hundreds of college and university staff and students. Since 2006, the NIRSA Championship Series has included regional and national flag football tournament. The 2025-2026 version of the rulebook is the 22nd edition and is overseen by the NIRSA Flag Football editorial board.

=== NFL Flag ===
The National Football League and its teams have promoted and sponsored flag football leagues in the United States as a youth sport under the branding NFL Flag; in 2020, Denver Broncos quarterback Russell Wilson became a chairman and co-owner of NFL Flag, as part of efforts by the NFL to expand its promotion of the sport into other territories. The program has also placed a particular focus on expanding women's flag football, due to gridiron football having predominantly been played by men.

In 2023, the NFL reformatted its Pro Bowl all-star game as the Pro Bowl Games, which featured teams of AFC and NFC all-stars competing in skills challenges for points throughout the week of festivities, which then carried over into a series of three flag football games on the culminating Sunday. In 2023 and 2024, NFL Flag also hosted its world championships as part of the Pro Bowl festivities. In February 2025, NFL commissioner Roger Goodell stated that the NFL was considering launching professional flag football leagues, while a source with knowledge of the league stated to ProFootballTalk that Goodell's statement was an "understatement" and that work on the proposed league is "very much underway". In April 2025 it was reported that ten groups had submitted bids to the NFL to be investors in the new flag football leagues. In October 2025 Goodell stated that the league planned to launch women's and men's professional flag football leagues "in the next couple of years. In December 2025 the NFL teams voted in a virtual meeting to financially support the league with the league's Investment fund 32 Equity to enter into an agreement with a partner to operate a professional flag football league and invest up to $32 million in that league.

=== American Flag Football League ===
The American Flag Football League (AFFL) is a flag football organization that offers youth and women's competition, and in 2023, a men's professional division.

=== Varsity flag football ===
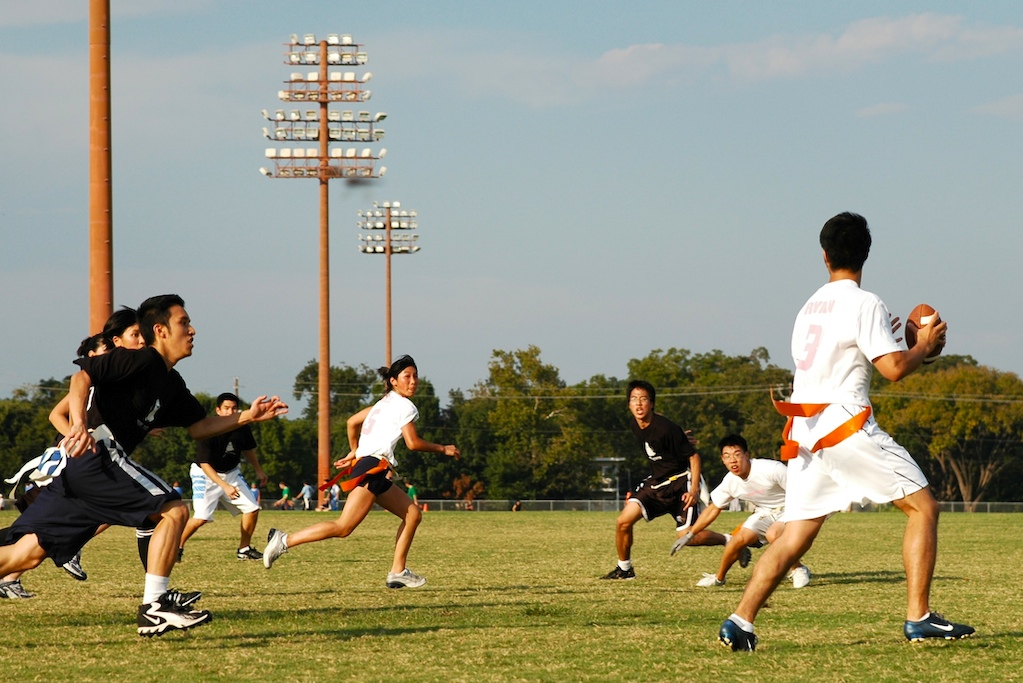
People playing flag football

During the 2000s flag football became one of the fastest growing high school sports for female student-athletes, with the NFL, its member teams, and league sponsors providing substantial support for new programs. Florida became the first state to officially sanction varsity girls' flag football in 2002 with 103 high schools taking part in its first season. As of the 2025-26 school year, 20 states fully sanctioned a state championship, two more (Louisiana and North Carolina) would add it for the 2026-27 season, and 19 other states recognized "emerging" or "pilot" programs. Unlike tackle football there is no set season for girls' varsity flag football; some states play in the fall alongside the traditional football schedule while others play in the spring. The rapid growth of the sport prompted the NFHS to publish its first national rule book in 2025. The NFHS rule set is based around each team having seven players and provides flexibility for states to adopt local rules such as field size/markings and whether to allow kicking plays.

By May 2020, the National Association of Intercollegiate Athletics (NAIA), in partnership with the NFL, had begun the process of adding flag football as a varsity sport for female student-athletes. The NAIA became the first collegiate governing body to sanction the sport at the varsity level. NAIA women's flag football began during the 2020–21 season as an emerging sport with at least 15 teams, and the NAIA and NFL also expected an upgrade of the sport to an invitational level sport by 2022 with at least 25 teams.

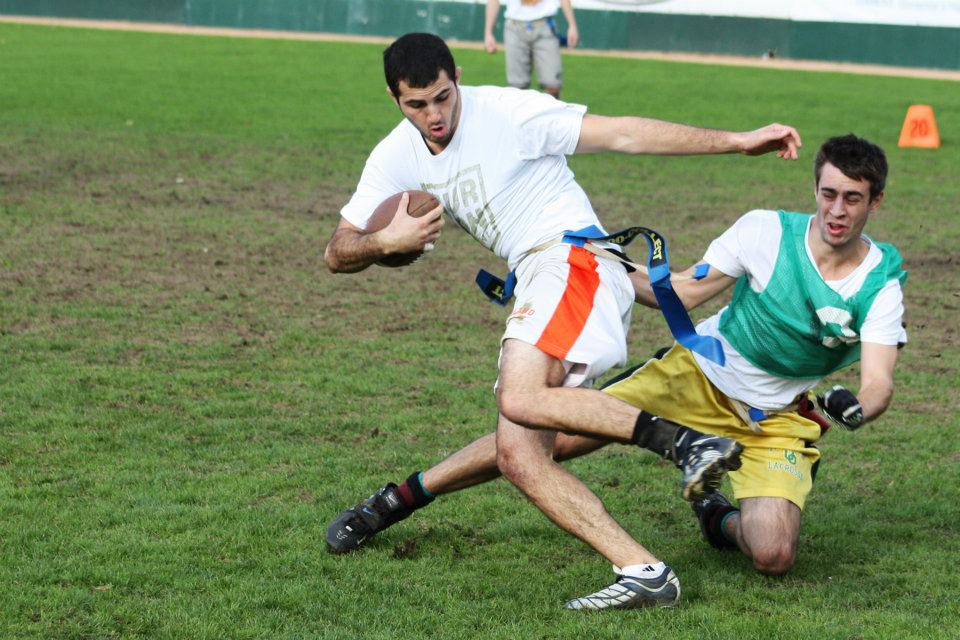
Person pulling an opponent's flag

In 2023, the National Junior College Athletic Association (NJCAA) began to sponsor flag football as an emerging women's sport.

In the spring of 2025, the Atlantic East Conference of NCAA Division III began independently sponsoring women's flag football, with support from the NFL and the Philadelphia Eagles. In July 2024, Conference Carolinas (CC) of NCAA Division II announced that six of its 16 member schools would sponsor women's flag football, starting in the spring of 2026. By the time CC started its first flag football season, two more full members and three associate members (one of them Division I Mount St. Mary's) had also joined its flag football league. In February 2025, the NCAA's Committee on Women's Athletics recommended that the association's three divisions add flag football as a varsity sport under its Emerging Sports for Women program; at the time of the recommendation, approximately 65 NCAA member institutions had varsity- or club-level flag football teams. At the January 2026 NCAA convention, all three divisions approved this addition, with the first season under "emerging" status being held in spring 2026.

On March 21, 2026, the Big South Conference announced it would start sponsoring flag football in the 2028 season (2027–28 school year), making it the first Division I conference to make such an announcement. At the time of announcement, five full members (Charleston Southern, Gardner–Webb, Radford, UNC Asheville, USC Upstate) had either already added the sport or committed to adding it in the near future. However, the Big South would not be the first D-I conference to officially sponsor the sport. On June 16, 2026, the Mid-Eastern Athletic Conference announced it would start a flag football championship in the 2026–27 school year.

In May 2026, the NCAA recommended that all three divisions sponsor legislation to elevate flag football to full championship status, initially as a "National Collegiate" championship open to members of all divisions. By that time, over 100 NCAA members had planned to field women's flag football teams in the spring 2027 season. Should said legislation be passed at the January 2027 NCAA convention, the first official championship could take place as early as spring 2028.

== Canada ==
=== Varsity flag football ===
The Réseau du sport étudiant du Québec (RSEQ), a U Sports conference in Quebec, began sponsoring university women's flag football independently of U Sports in 2021. Additionally, the RSEQ is also a member of the Canadian Collegiate Athletic Association (CCAA) and has sponsored college women's flag football since 2009 and men's flag football since 2017. The version of flag football played by the RSEQ is a hybrid of American football and Canadian football rules, utilizing Canadian fields and scoring rules with the 4 downs seen in the American game.

=== Canadian Flag Football League ===
The Canadian Flag Football League (CFFL) was established in 2019 and runs Canada's CFFL National Championship. The league is affiliated with Football Canada, the national governing body for football in Canada and its variants. The winners of the CFFL National Championship also gain the opportunity to represent Canada in international competition.

The league's major objective is to help integrate existing adult flag leagues on a nationwide basis. Depending on the region, teams compete in their Regional Championships, either Eastern, Western, or Central. The top two teams from each division advance to the national championship.

There are three divisions for the CFFL: male, female, and mixed.

==== Flag Football National Championships ====
The Canadian Flag Football National Championships (FFNC) was established in 2007 to provide athletes with the opportunity to develop their skills and compete in national team competitions and eventually the Canadian Flag Football League (CFFL) which was established in 2019. Since its inception, the format of the championship has undergone several changes.

In 2011, in response to the growth of flag football and the development of Football Canada's Long-Term Athlete Development (LTAD) model, the under-15 co-ed division was replaced by separate boys and girls under-16 divisions. These divisions supplemented the pre-existing under-18 divisions that were added in 2010.

By 2013, the championship featured three divisions: male and female under-16 divisions and a female under-18 division.

In 2017, with the introduction of the Under-16 Regional Flag Challenge, the championship shifted to an under-18 format with male and female divisions.

== Europe ==
IFAF European Flag Football Championship since 2003. Last in 2025, when Italian men's and British women's national teams win their respective European Championship titles in Paris, France.

=== United Kingdom ===
Flag football competition in the United Kingdom is, mostly, 5-a-side. There are two main organizations: the adult-only Outlaw Flag League, which run Tournaments from March to October, culminating in playoff and championships. Secondly, there is the NFFL, the National Flag Football League, organized by the British American Football Association (BAFA). At a senior level, there are sixty teams divided into two leagues - NFL Division One: Highlands, North A, North B, Midlands, South East, and South West and The Premiership: Highlands, North, South East, and South West, with the top teams qualifying for playoffs at the end of the season. BAFA also runs The Youth Flag Football League (YFFL) and organizes teams competing at under 17, under 14, and under 11. Flag football games in the UK are played with five players on each side with no contact, and are officiated according to the IFAF flag football rules with a few minor variations. The U17s and U14s, and U11s, compete in the National Youth Flag Football League, which runs from April to August, with teams playing in four conferences; Scotland, Northern, Middle England, and Southern to qualify for National Finals Day and ultimately be crowned National Champions.

== See also ==
- Touch football (American) – Variant of American football
- American flag rugby – Mixed-gender, non-contact version of rugby union
- League tag
- Tag rugby – Non-contact team game
- Touch rugby – Derivatives of rugby league involving touching instead of tackling
