= Irish Tag Rugby Association =

Founding body for tag rugby in Ireland

The Irish Tag Rugby Association, also known as ITRA, is the official founding body of adult Tag Rugby in Ireland.

== History ==
ITRA was founded in 2000 and since then it has organized nationwide tag rugby summer leagues. In 2003 weekend blitz's were introduced, with the addition of spring leagues in 2005.
