= International Woman's Flag Football Association =

Football association

International Women's Flag Football Association
- "Women should run their own sport"
- Abbreviation: IWFFA
- Founded: 1997; 29 years ago
- Type: Sports federation
- Legal status: Governing body of Female Flag Football
- Purpose: Sport governance
- Region served: Worldwide
- Website: IWFFA

The International Women's Flag Football Association (IWFFA) is the umbrella organization for female flag football around the world. The organization prides itself on being owned and operated by women whose motto is, "women should run their own sport".

IWFFA offers girls and women's flag football tournaments in North America, Scandinavia, Central America, Asia and the Caribbean. Their outreach program offers flag football clinics and training for players, coaches, and officials to any group wanting to develop female flag football in their area. Since 1997, the IWFFA has introduced the sport of flag football in countries: Denmark, Norway, Sweden, Iceland, El Salvador, Guatemala and Afghanistan.

Less importance is stressed on winning, and more stress is placed on camaraderie, unity and to "Experience the Excitement" in order to invite all females regardless of the skill level to participate in competitions so that they can learn skills from playing the sport, then to transfer to other areas of their lives.

Other goals are to professionalize women's flag football and to promote female flag football through tournaments, trainings and promotional tours held annually throughout the world. IWFFA ranks teams nationally (USA) and internationally. The IWFFA recognizes athletic achievements of female flag football players.

The IWFFA honors any woman or man, each year, who has contributed to the sport by presenting the Porter Wilson Award. The World Challenge Game is a competition between USA All Stars vs International All Stars played in Key West, Florida, USA following the International Women & Girls Flag Football Championship called the Kelly McGillis Classic.

The IWFFA has won numerous awards such as the Dick Butkas Award for their website, 1996 National Sports Emmy Award for "Football America" TNT/NFL Films chosen outstanding edited sports special (Kelly McGillis Classic).

All females are encouraged to become members of the IWFFA organization. The IWFFA sanctions regions, leagues, and teams and offers great support to individual player members. The IWFFA produces a monthly newsletter and Forward Pass Magazine which is a bi-annual girls and women's flag football magazine. On the Air with the IWFFA is a monthly radio podcast which features interviews of players, coaches and celebrities.

The creation of the game of Flag Football can be attributed to Porter Wilson, who was the man who invented flag a tag belts & flags used as equipment to play the sport.

== IWFFA Rules ==
IWFFA adapted its rules from the National Women's Flag Football League (1995) which have been modified from time to time, to incorporate as many flag football skills as possible so that any girl or woman can find a role on the team and contribute in a meaningful way.

Basic Rules are:

- 8 on 8
- Center and Two Guards are ineligible receivers
- Blocking between shoulders and waist
- Down field blocking allowed
- Field goals, extra point kicks and punts are allowed
- Fake kicks and defensive rush allowed
- Defensive line may rush QB as soon as ball is snapped
- No helmets, no fumbles, no pads, or tackling allowed

== Tournaments ==
The most notable tournament is the Kelly McGillis Classic International Female Flag Football Championship & World Challenge Game, Key West, FL. held in January in Key West, FL. This tournament has brought as many as 49 teams from across the United States and countries such as: Canada, Mexico, Norway, Denmark, Sweden, Iceland, Scotland, Puerto Rico, Panama, El Salvador, Honduras, Guatemala and Egypt.

=== 2018 Tournaments ===
27th Kelly McGillis Classic International Female Flag Football Championship &World Challenge, Key West, FL. January 25–29, 2018 (Full Week of Events: January 22–29)

6th Readington, New Jersey June 23–24, 2018 Hosted by NJWFF

3rd San Salvador, El Salvador June 30 – July 1, 2018 Hosted by ASFA

1st Asia Regional Jaipur, India June 30 – July 1 Hosted by EFLI

3rd Havana, Cuba Friendship Game July 21

15th Gothenburg, Sweden August 25–26, 2018 Hosted by Gothenburg Angels

4th Key West Women's Fest September 7–8, 2018 Friendship Game and Clinic - Loose Women Only

13th IWFFA Ptown Classic, September 14–16, 2018 Provincetown, Massachusetts

1st Cancún, Mexico October 4–8, 2018

5th Guatemala City, Guatemala November 3–4, 2018 Hosted by Guatemala Women's Flag Football League

28th Kelly McGillis Classic International Women & Girls Flag Football Championship Key West, Florida, USA January 24–28, 2019 (Games Only) (Full Week of Events: January 22–29, 2019)

== History ==
In April 1997, the International Women's Flag Football Association (IWFFA) was founded by Diane Beruldsen and is the first international women's flag football association. The IWFFA was developed from previous leagues founded by Diane Beruldsen: Brooklyn Women's Flag Football League, New York Women's Flag Football League, Key West Women's Flag Football League. In 1995 Ms. Beruldsen founded the National Women's Flag Football Association, the very first women's national flag football association.

Since its inception, the IWFFA has traveled to other countries throughout Europe to introduce the sport and start new teams and leagues. In 1997, the IWFFA brought flag football to Scandinavia by starting the first women's flag football team in Denmark: the Copenhagen Mermaids. In 1999 the Oslo Trolls (Norway) was formed. In 2000, the Gothenburg Angels (Sweden), Team Ice (Iceland) was formed and as the IWFFA traveled for six months during its 2000 promotional tour throughout the Nordic Region (Norway, Sweden, Denmark, Iceland, Finland), many teams were formed and thus, the Nordic Region for Women's Flag Football. The IWFFA travels all over the world to promote female flag football. The majority of teams and leagues are in the United States where it holds the largest female flag football tournament: Kelly McGillis Classic (KMC). In 2001, the KMC hosted 49 teams, 9 international and 40 national teams from the USA. It was the largest international flag football competition ever which brought 1,500 flag football players to the island of Key West, Florida, USA.

The First Annual World Challenge Game sponsored by Tylenol was held in 2008 following the regular tournament play of the Kelly McGillis Classic. U.S.A. All Stars vs International All Stars make up the two competing teams in the World Challenge Games.
