= Mini rugby =

Form of rugby union for children

Mini rugby, also known as New Image Rugby, is a form of rugby union designed to introduce the sport to children. It uses a smaller ball and pitch than standard rugby, and has eight to ten players a side.

Invented in England in 1970, mini rugby was soon taken up by both the English Rugby Football Union (RFU) and the Welsh Rugby Union.

The original game had five backs and four forwards. There were no line-outs and no pushing in the scrum, which was made up of a prop, a hooker, a lock and a flanker. Each position behind the scrum in the senior game was represented by a scrum half, an outside half, a centre, a wing and a fullback.

The International Rugby Board does not directly govern very junior levels of rugby but rather leaves local bodies to do things as they see fit. Consequently, different countries have different junior versions of rugby designed to appeal to, and be safe for, younger children.

== Mini Rugby in England ==
Technically, the RFU's regulations for age-grade rugby under the age of 13 are collectively known as "the rugby continuum", and "mini rugby" is just one of the stages of that continuum, and one part of that continuum is known as "Mini Rugby." However, "mini rugby" is much less of a mouthful and often used to refer to all age groups under the age of 13.

The age grade of a player is determined by his or her age at the start of the junior season, which is midnight on 31 August. An "under-8", for example, must start the season aged 7, but may turn 8 during the season and will carry on playing as an under-8 until the start of the next season. This ties in with the school year and as a result, if you add 5 to their school year you will get their rugby age group. For example, school year 2s are rugby Under-7s. School year 7s (first secondary year) are rugby Under-12s.

There are 3 stages to the rugby continuum.

- Continuum Stage 1: under-7 and under-8 (school years 2&3) - Mini Tag Rugby
- Continuum Stage 2: under-9 and under-10 (school years 4&5) - Mini Rugby
- Continuum Stage 3: under-11 and under-12 (school years 6&7) - Midi Rugby

Ages under-13 to under-19 are then sometimes referred to as "youth rugby", where the game is only modified from the senior game in relatively minor ways. Some modifications may include the need for both feet to be placed in the ground at all times, so no diving to score a try, the team must consist of no more than seven players but at least five, in senior rugby there are fifteen players in one game, free passes are given if a player accidentally throws a ball forward, balls cannot be stripped from a players hands, and kicking is not allowed in youth rugby “rookie rugby.” The differences between the two types of play seem to be different, but all the rules of the game have the same intention.

The rule changes based on the rugby continuum are designed to make the game both safe and enjoyable for the level of physical and intellectual development expected in any given age group.

Here is a summary of the modifications to the International Rugby Board (IRB)'s Laws of the game:

=== Continuum Stage 1: U7 & U8 (Mini Tag Rugby) ===
U7 and U8 rugby is played on a relatively small pitch with cloth strips (tags) that are attached to a belt with velcro. Tackling in "Mini Rugby" is replaced by tagging. Tagging is the removal of one of a players tags attached to their belts. And with tagging, it helps reduce the risk of early injuries and health related issues. The game is simplified for the younger generations to understand the concept of consistently running and passing.

- Pitch maximum size 60x30m.
- Ball: Size 3.
- 10 min each way.
- 5 to 7 a side.
- 5 points for a try. No conversions
- Not allowed: tackling (just tagging), rucks, mauls, handing the ball to a teammate, ripping, going to ground, lineouts, scrums, kicking, hand-offs.
- An under-8 team can only be tagged a maximum number of times before they lose the ball

=== Continuum Stage 2: U9 & U10 (Mini Rugby) ===
U9 and U10 rugby is played with tackling instead of tagging and the game becomes more physical as age increases. However scrums are NOT allowed in U9 rugby. In U10 scrums are allowed. Scrums consist of three players from each team. The scrum is uncontested and whichever team wins the scrum gets rewarded the ball, which will then be thrown to the winning team to start a play. There are an equal number of players for both sides, a maximum of seven for U9 and maximum of eight for U10.

- Pitch maximum size 60x35m.
- Ball: Size 3 for U9s, Size 4 for U10s.
- 15 min each way.
- Up to 9 a side.
- 5 points for a try. No conversions.
- Allowed: tackling, handing the ball to a teammate, ripping, going to ground,
- Not allowed: kicking or hand-offs.

=== Continuum Stage 3: U11 & U12 (Midi Rugby) ===
U11 rugby consists of twelve players, five of whom who participate in the scrum, while in U12 rugby consists of thirteen players, six of whom who participate in a scrum. What starts the game is a drop kick. After the ball is drop kicked to the opposing team, they will then gather the ball and decide if they want to keep it in play, having the ball drop kicked again, or beginning a scrum in the center of the field. Player can also be called for aggressive actions which include, high/late tackling, an offside, kicking, or an obstruction to the player or the ball. Rucks are also allowed.

- Pitch maximum size 60x43m.
- Ball: Size 4.
- 20 mins each way.
- Up to 12 a side (U11). Up to 13 a side (U12).
- 5 points for a try. 2 points for a conversion.
- Allowed: 5 player scrums and lineouts for U11s. 6 for U12s. Some limited kicking
- Not allowed: fly-hacking, drop goals, penalty goals, hand-offs.

== Other names ==
Mini rugby is known in Wales as "dragon rugby", and Australia as "walla rugby". In Ireland the under-7s version of mini rugby is a touch or tag game with no set pieces known as "leprechaun rugby".

== Famous mini rugby players ==
England: Well-known English players who came up through the mini rugby system include Jeremy Guscott and Ben Clarke.

United States: Well-known players from the United States include Garrett Bender, Andrew Durutalo, Zack Test, Chris Wyles, Ben Pinkelman, Madison Hughes.

Australia: More well-known players from Australia include Nathan Sharpe, Adam Ashley-Cooper, Tatafu Polota-Nau, Benn Robinson, Kurtely Beale, Berrick Barnes.

== Midi rugby ==
Midi rugby is the "bridge" between mini rugby and the full game. It is played twelve a-side. For the under 12s this is altered to 13 a-side.

== See also ==
- Tag Rugby
- American Flag Rugby
