= Tag rugby =

Non-contact team game

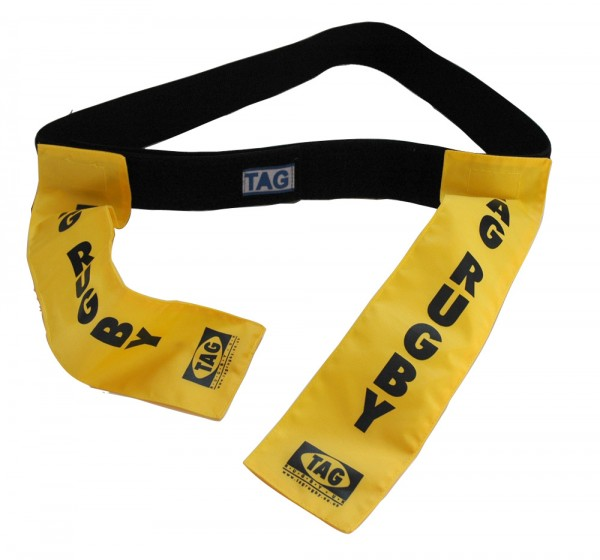
Tag-rugby belt

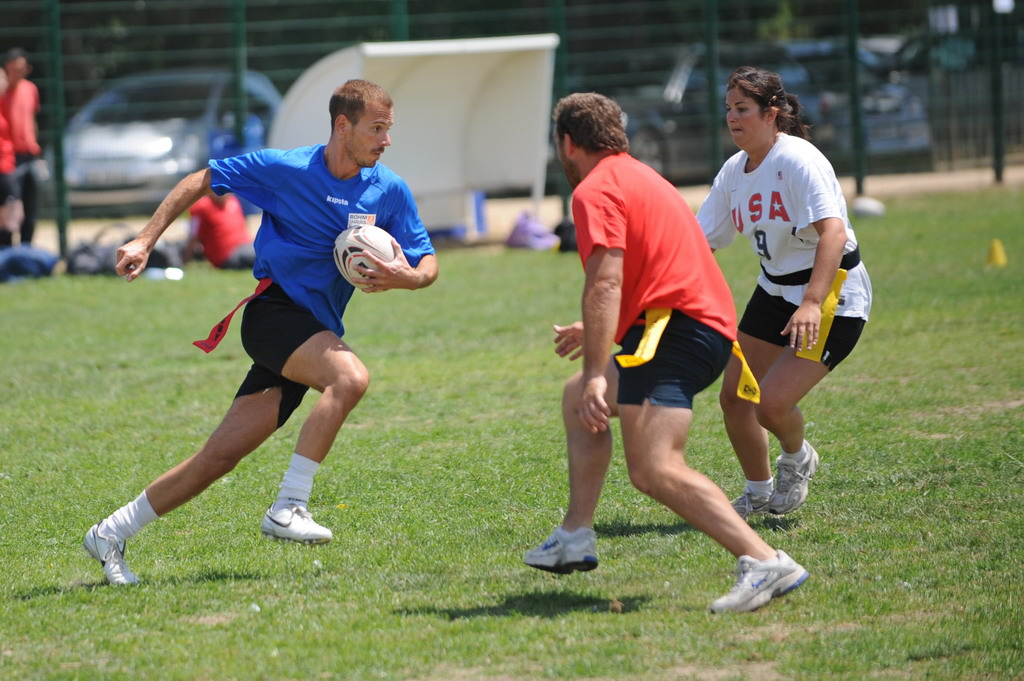
Tag rugby

Tag rugby, flag rugby or rippa rugby is a non-contact team game in which each player wears a belt that has two velcro tags attached to it, or shorts with velcro patches. The mode of play is based on rugby league with many similarities to touch football, although tag rugby is often deemed a closer simulation of full contact rugby league than touch. Attacking players attempt to dodge, evade and pass a rugby ball while defenders attempt to prevent them scoring by "tagging" – pulling a velcro attached tag from the ball carrier, rather than a full contact tackle. Tag rugby is used in development and training by both rugby league and rugby union communities.

Tag rugby comes in several forms with OzTag, Try Tag Rugby (UK) and Mini Tag being some of the better known variations. Tag rugby has the highest participation levels in Australia, Ireland, New Zealand and the United Kingdom.

== History ==
According to sportswriter Terry Godwin, writing in 1983, tag rugby was first developed in Gibraltar by the Gibraltar Rugby Football Union. Due to the lack of grass pitches, an alternative variant to rugby union was developed. A 10-inch (25 cm) cord was tucked into the waistband, and its removal by an opponent with a shout of "tag", was classed as a 'tackle'. If the attacking team had failed to score by the fourth 'tackle' the defending team were given possession of the ball. (Note: Despite several sites reporting that tag rugby was invented by Perry Haddock in Australia around 1990 (this is OzTag, a variant of Tag Rugby), Godwin's wrote about the topic seven years prior. Godwin does not mention when the sport began on Gibraltar, but he does explicitly use the term "Tag Rugby" to describe the game.)

The codified version of tag rugby was created and pioneered by physical education teacher Nick Leonard in England in 1990 following an idea given to by a former serviceman called Barry Johns. He are described to Nick how navy servicemen on board ship or whilst playing on hard grounds overseas played the Gibraltar variant of rugby. Leonard then devised a set of rules suitable for children using belts and coloured ribbons attached by velcro and organised the first ever schools Tag Rugby festival at UCP Marjons, Plymouth in 1991. This annual event celebrated its 20th festival in 2011.

== Tag rugby variants ==
=== OzTag ===
OzTag is a non-contact form of rugby league, and can be seen as a variation of British tag rugby. Cronulla Sharks and St George Dragons halfback Perry Haddock introduced the sport in Australia while coaching the 1992 St George Jersey Flegg side. Together with Chris Parkes, the two took the sport to fields across Australia. Today, it is played by over 200,000 players in organised leagues across the country.

Games are usually played over 20 minutes a half. The normal dimensions of the field are 70×50 metres. Eight players in each team are allowed on the field at a time.

The attacking team has five plays or tags to try to score a try or take the ball down field as close to the line as possible. Like most versions of tag rugby, a tackle is made when one of two velcro stripes, known as tags, is removed from the ball carrier's shorts.

Players can pass and kick the ball and tries are worth one point and there are no conversions. Kicking in general play is allowed but it must be below shoulder height of the referee and on zero count with no play-the-ball (from playing a knock-on advantage for instance) or after the fourth tag.

For mixed gender games, there is a maximum of four male players per team on the field and a try scored by a female player is worth two points, compared to one point for male players.

=== Mini Tag ===
The rules of under-7s Mini Tag possess some rugby union features, like an unlimited tackle count. It does not have an equivalent of the six tags law and instead tackled players must off-load the ball. Under-8s Mini Tag on the other hand, retains a six tag law (RFU Continuum 3.5.g) which requires that on the 7th tag the referee will stop the game and give the ball to the other side. The restart is with a free pass. For the full set of rules of Mini Tag see the Mini Tag Rulebook.

Mini Tag is currently the only form of rugby permitted by the English RFU for under-7 and under-8 age groups. Mini Tag requires the use of a size 3 rugby ball and does not allow scrums, line-outs or kicking.

== Tag rugby worldwide ==
=== Australia ===
Since its beginnings in 1992, OzTag (or Walla Tag) has grown in popularity across Australia in urban and rural areas. Twenty-eight teams participated in the first season in summer 1992–1993 playing in the Cronulla and St George areas of Sydney. Today, 150,000 players take part in OzTag competitions nationally

There are Oztag competitions running all over Australia, with the largest areas located in Sydney, Brisbane and Canberra. Competing teams are in six divisions: women's open, mixed, men's open and men's over-30s, 35s, and 40s.

=== England and Great Britain ===
In 2003–04, the English Rugby Football Union introduced Mini Tag into its junior development program called The Three Stages of the Rugby Continuum, replacing touch rugby.

Tag rugby also developed via IMBRL (Inter Message Board Rugby League) where message boards representing clubs took part in tournaments and friendly matches. Some developed into full-contact teams, others became tag teams and others folded. In 2008, a Tag Merit League was established based on the RL Merit League format. The league was developed with the intention to encourage new clubs outside the older IMBRL circuit to play tag rugby league. The Merit League operates on normal rugby league laws with tags taking the place of tackles.

In 2009 Try Tag Rugby began running adult tag rugby competitions throughout London using OzTag rules. By the summer of 2011, over 1,000 players were regularly taking part in week night evening leagues across London at locations such as Finsbury Park, Gladstone Park, Wandsworth Town, Tooting Bec, Richmond, Shoreditch, Highbury and Southwark Park. The number of competitions continues to expand with over 240 teams competing across venues in London and Reading in the summer of 2014. Try Tag Rugby also host the annual London Tag Rugby Championships which attracts teams from across the UK and Europe. 42 teams registered for the event in 2013, playing 136 matches under 17 referees across nine pitches; a UK record for an adult Tag Rugby tournament. In September 2014 the Rugby Football League and Try Tag Rugby announced that they would be forming a partnership to increase participation in the sport across England. In early 2015 Try Tag Rugby announced they were expanding to Yorkshire, with leagues set to begin in April 2015. Try Tag Rugby have continued to grow the game substantially in 2016 with 507 teams competing in early summer leagues.

Try Tag Rugby are the UK's official delegates of the European Tag Federation (ETF) and the International Tag Football Federation (ITFF). The Great Britain Tag Rugby Team has hosted inbound tours from Australia in 2011 and 2014, and the Tongan over 30s Men's team in 2013. The Great Britain mixed open and men's teams also competed in the 2012 Tag Rugby World Cup in Auckland, New Zealand, while 2013 saw the first annual Britain and Irish Cup. In 2016 Ireland won British & Irish Cup for a third time, by defeating Great Britain 4 - 2 across a record six categories. In 2017 Great Britain competed against Ireland in Cork across six categories once again, with Ireland retaining the cup winning the Mixed Open, Mixed Seniors, Women's Open and Women's Seniors divisions to take a 4-2 Victory.

In 2018, Great Britain played Ireland at the British & Irish Cup in Dublin, in preparation for the ITF Tag World Cup held in Coffs Harbour Australia in November 2018. The tournament was reduced to four categories and Ireland again retained the cup for a fifth consecutive time narrowly defeating Great Britain by 26-22 competition points with the Great Britain Men's Open and Men's Seniors teams picking up victories.

At the 2018 ITF Tag World Cup, Great Britain came away with three medals, including a silver medal in the Men's Seniors division, a bronze medal in the Women's Seniors and a Men's Open victory in the Plate competition, whilst the Mixed Open side lost in the Plate Semi-Finals to New Zealand.

In 2019 off the back of great momentum from the 2018 World Cup, Great Britain won the British & Irish Cup for the first time, defeating Ireland 4–2 in London, winning the Women's Seniors, Women's Open, Men's Open and Mixed Seniors categories, with the tournament once again expanded to six categories.

=== Ireland ===
The Irish Tag Rugby Association (ITRA) introduced adult tag rugby to Ireland in 2000 in association with the Irish Rugby Football Union when the first ever league was run for 36 teams. Their league is known as Volvic Tag. The Irish Rugby Football Union Tag Rugby began to run its own tag rugby leagues in 2007 following a split with ITRA.

The sport has become particularly popular in Ireland and in 2007, over 28,000 players in the two programmes making up more than 1,700 teams took part in tag rugby at 50 venues all over the country. This increased in 2008 and 2009.

There are four major types of tag rugby played there. They include men-only leagues, women-only leagues, mixed leagues (in which a minimum of one player must be female with no more than four male players on the pitch), and vets league (over-35s). Each type is usually played in four different ability categories ranging from A league (the most competitive) through B, C, and beginners league (the most inexperienced and usually the least competitive). Veterans leagues comprise teams of players all over 35 yrs old.

Many companies pay for or sponsor company teams as a method of recreation hence this format of rugby's popularity and its non-contact nature makes it playable for mixed sex and age teams and inter-office competitions.

The Pig 'n' Porter Festival is held each July in Old Crescent RFC, Limerick. It is the largest single Tag Rugby tournament in the world with up to 150 tag teams taking part each year for the top prize. The tournament regularly attracts teams from England, Scotland, France and the Netherlands.

In 2014 the ITRA introduced Rep rules which aligned their laws with the International Tag Federation. Players have the opportunity of playing for their Regional Teams (Cork, Dublin, Galway, Limerick, Clare and Kildare) from which players can play in the Tag World Cup representing Ireland.

=== Hong Kong ===
HKTag developed in direct association with Hong Kong Rugby League (HKRL), itself established in 2015. Leveraging the official rules of OzTag, tag rugby first appeared at the inaugural 2015 HKRL Nines, as a minimal contact, mixed format alternative to rugby league, and brought together more than 100 male and female players.

The growth of HKTag was the HKRL standout success of 2016. HKTag became the official governing body of Tag Rugby in Hong Kong and launched two more domestic competitions - Battle of Origin and HKTag Super League. This year also saw the introduction of regular social tag rugby sessions throughout spring and summer, which today continue all year round.

HKTag today has a community of members, participating in weekly Tag for All sessions, beginners' workshops, summer beach tag and seasonal competitions. The 2018 HKTag Challenge saw participation of 12 teams and more than 140 players from all over the world.

In November 2018, Hong Kong sent a squad to the Tag World Cup in Coffs Harbour representing the mixed open and male open divisions.

=== New Zealand ===
In the Summer of 1993-4 tag was introduced to New Zealand by John Ackland a development officer with the Auckland Rugby League who had been to Sydney and met with the founder of Oztag Perry Haddock from Oztag Australia to expand the game in Auckland New Zealand. The First Kiwitag module was launched and run by Ackland from Fowlds Park in Auckland on Monday nights for 8–10 weeks. From this tag would begin its growth and development in Auckland and Porirua Wellington. The Otahuhu Tag Module and Wellington would be recognised partners to Oztag in New Zealand. Unfortunately, The game was to implode politically and become fragmented for the next 8 years. The Otahuhu and Porirua based NZTag body led by Wally Tooman and Hilda Harawera gained control of the game at international level, with the rest of the tag modules at the time from Howick, Northcote, Mt Albert, Waitemata Pakuranga and Ellerslie excluded and left to fend for themselves with no assistance from Otahuhu-based NZTag or the Auckland Rugby League.

It was not until the summer of 2000 that a meeting initiated by Stan Martin and William Halligan of the ARL was held at Carlaw Park between all the exiled tag modules to bring everyone together under one umbrella in the Auckland region. This would result in the formation of Auckland Kiwitag Inc with the Otahuhu NZtag Module declining to join the organisation.

Oztag Australia's Perry Haddock would eventually reach out to the Chairman of Auckland Kiwitag Mr Claude Iusitini to play New Zealand teams selected from players outside of the Otahuhu Module for the first time and continue to do so to this day. Auckland Kiwitag would continue to administer the game of tag from 2004 to 2009 in amalgamation with Porirua Tag in Wellington then in September 2009 would rebrand and relaunch itself as New Zealand Tag Football Incorporated which has now been the recognised National body for all things tag football in New Zealand for over 10 years.

In 2003 the New Zealand Rugby Union established "Rippa rugby" – a variant of tag football – as a developmental tool and game for young children, and for primary school tournaments.

A split in the Auckland Kiwitag Board would see the launch of another version of tag called Tag20 Rugby a hybrid version of tag in New Zealand which was led by Gary Bauer and Todd Price in partnership with Australia-based Steve 'Chief' Lyons.

=== Tonga ===
Tonga National Tag Team is the Tonga national tag team also known as Laione Hau or Tonga Tag. Established in October 2011, The first official national Tonga Tag team participated in the Pacific Cup hosted by New Zealand in February 2012. All variants of Tag Rugby and Flag Football are played in Tonga.

=== Samoa ===
Samoan Tag Incorporated is the National Tag Sports body in Samoa. Established in 2018, The first official Tag tournament was held in Apia on 3 February 2018.

=== Sri Lanka ===
Sri Lanka Oztag, which is based in Australia and was established in 2015, participated in its first official tournament in 2015, the Emerging Nations Tournament before competing at the 2015 World Cup. In 2016, Sri Lanka Oztag won the Emerging Nations Tournament and will be competing in the 2018 World Cup.

=== United States ===
A tag game known as EagleTag, or non contact rugby league or flag rugby, is played in the United States using the same rules as Oz Tag. Another tag game based on the laws of rugby union, known as American flag rugby, takes place in a league every Saturday morning in July in Morris County, New Jersey.

=== Chile ===
Rugby Para Todos (RPT)

Origins

Rugby Para Todos (RPT) is a non-contact educational rugby methodology that originated in 2015. The program was developed as a playful and educational approach focused on inclusion, wellbeing, school coexistence, and democratizing access to sports and educational experiences.

Institutional recognition in Chile

In 2023, Rugby Para Todos was officially recognized by the Chilean Ministry of Sports and the National Sports Institute (IND) through Resolution NC-00726/2023, which approved “Rugby Para Todos” as a recognized sports specialty within the rugby sports modality under Chilean sports legislation.

The recognition was granted through the resolution: “Approves the recognition of the physical activity ‘Rugby Para Todos’ as a specialty of the rugby sports modality.” Official documentation: Official Resolution NC-00726/2023 – Ministry of Sports of Chile. https://documentos-digitales-std-mindep-new.s3.amazonaws.com/prueba/g35JcOcNkHD24zGZ3yZQMMngtFrfeSLVMF3My6z7.pdf

=== International tag rugby league festivals ===
The Rochdale Swarm International Mixed Tag Rugby League Festival returned for its 7th year on 1 August 2015. Teams from France, Ireland, Scotland and Wales regularly participate alongside teams drawn from Rochdale, including Fijians and the local Asian Community, plus Kiwi and Aussie exiles. This is complemented by teams from all across England. The festival is a non-contact, mixed gender 7-a-side competition, where at least 2 of the 7 are female.

The Pig 'n' Porter Tag Rugby festival, the largest in the world, is held each July on the grounds of Old Crescent Rugby Club, Limerick, Ireland. Over 120 teams take part in the weekend event. The popularity of the event can also be attributed to the après-tag festivities which include a hog roast and live music.

The Malta International Tag Rugby Festival was launched in 2011 with teams having contested the festival in its first two seasons from England, Scotland, France and the Maltese islands of Malta and Gozo. The festival is a partner event of the Malta Rugby League (MRL). London's Try Tag Rugby All-Stars have been a regular feature at the festival every year since its inception and the festival is becoming known as 'the hottest tag rugby festival in Europe'. Winners of the Malta International Tag Rugby Festival have been Try Tag Rugby All-Stars - UK (2011), Try Tag Rugby All-Stars - UK (2012) and Tumeke - UK (2013).

In December 2015 Sunshine Coast, Queensland, Australia hosted the Tag Rugby World Cup. In November 2018, the Tag Rugby World Cup will be held in Coffs Harbour, Australia.

== See also ==
- Mini rugby
- Touch football – also known as Touch Rugby
- Flag football – the equivalent spinoff from American football.
