= American flag rugby =

Mixed-gender, non-contact version of rugby union

American flag rugby (AFR) is a mixed-gender, non-contact version of rugby union played in the United States, and is a variant of the sport Tag Rugby. American flag rugby is designed for American children entering grades K–9. The organization itself exists to provide free start up kits and support to any community looking to add a youth rugby program to their community. The program has received great praise in the USA including an article in Rugby magazine and a spot on Fox Sports Net. The initial program from Morris County has helped create various other programs start up which now encompasses thousands of kids and adults across America participating in the youth sport and starting up programs.

== Overview ==
American flag rugby is divided up among four different levels based upon the grade level a child is entering. The four levels are:

- Owls (K–1st grades)
- Falcons (2nd–3rd grades)
- Hawks (4th–6th grades)
- Eagles (7th–9th grades)

Each division itself has a unique set of rules in recognition that there will be different ability levels between the various age groups. The game, while based on rugby union, is actually far more related to rugby sevens. Similarities are seen with the number of players on the field and the arrangement of the line-outs, scrums and kick-offs. Like rugby union, games are played in halves but the halves are significantly reduced. The halves are the same for all four levels at 10 minutes each instead of 40 minutes each.

The rule differences between each division are minor and gradually shift closer towards rugby union rules as the child advances up in divisions and increases his or her skill set. For Owls the game typically revolves around teaching the children to run with the ball, learning to touch the ball down when scoring a try and learning basic passing skills. Nothing is contested, there is no kicking, and there are no conversions. However, when children reach the Eagle level, many of the prior mentioned restrictions are removed and the children play with contest are allowed open field kicking, and the game has a more dynamic flow to it.

== Field size ==
- Owls: Fields are 20 meters by 30 meters. This is around 1/4 the size of a normal rugby union field. There are no goal posts as there are no conversions or open field kicking.
- Falcons: Fields are 25 meters by 50 meters. This is around 1/3 the size of a normal rugby union field. Goal posts can now be included but are not required.
- Hawks/Eagles: Fields are 40 meters by 60 meters. This is around 1/2 the size of a normal rugby union field. Field width is significantly increased as children's skills should have developed enough to include more open field kicking and passing.

== History ==
The first iteration of American flag rugby was founded by Tom Feury in 1998. Feury was initially looking for nothing more than a way to get his children and their friends introduced to the game. In 1999, the town of Denville granted him access to a field in order to do so. The first year began with only one team and 28 children.

== See also ==
- Mini rugby
- Rugby sevens
- Rugby tens
- Beach rugby
