= American football in the Philippines =

- Country: Philippines
- Governing body: American Tackle Football Federation of the Philippines
- National teams: Men's tackle football team; Men's flag football team; Women's flag football team

International competitions
- IFAF Asia-Oceania Flag Football Championships

American football in the Philippines is a niche sport which has been in the country as early as the 1990s. Historically the Philippines had an tackle football league in the 2010s.

== History ==
American football, in the form of flag football the non-contact variant has been in the Philippines as early as 1998.

There were leagues for the standard American football or tackle football in the Philippines in the 2010s. The Philippine Tackle Football League which lasted from 2009 to 2015, and later the Philippine–American Football League founded in 2016 and halted due to the COVID-19 pandemic in 2020. The Philippine national tackle football team also debuted in 2014. It was preceded by the Philippine Punishers of the American Football Federation of the Philippines in 2011. AFFP's women's team, the Lady Punishers played its first game in 2014.

In 2023, Flag football has seens a resurgence with the establishment of the Philippine men's and women's national flag football teams.

== Leagues ==
The ArenaBall Philippines was established in 2009 as a 7-a-side American football league in the Philippines. By the third season, the league now known as the Philippine Tackle Football League (PTFL) has transitioned to a 11-a-side game. However it became defunct in 2015.

In 2016, the PTFL was supplanted by the Philippine–American Football League The league was organized until the onset on the COVID-19 pandemic in 2020.

As of 2024, there are three active flag football leagues in Metro Manila; the Manila Flag Football League (MFL), the Philippine Olympic Committee-recognized Flag Football Philippines (FFP), and the league ran by the UP Flag Football Club (UPFFC). Cebu has the Cebu Flag Football League and the Cebu Integrated Flag Football Association.

== National teams ==
Tackle football

- Philippines national American football team

Flag football

- Philippines men's national flag football team
- Philippines women's national flag football team

== Filipinos in the NFL ==
Among the Philippines-born Filipinos who have played in the National Football League (NFL) in the United States are Tim Tebow and Eugene Amano.
