= 2026 IFAF Women's Flag Football World Championship =

Tournament information
- Sport: Flag football
- Location: Düsseldorf
- Dates: 13 August–16 August
- Host: Germany
- Venue: 1
- Teams: 16

Final positions
- Champions: Canada (3rd title)
- Runner-up: United States
- 3rd place: Mexico

The 2026 IFAF Women's Flag Football World Championship was the 12th World Championships in women's flag football. The tournament took place in Düsseldorf, Germany, from 13 to 16 August 2026.

The United States were the defending champions coming into the tournament, having beaten Mexico 31-18 in the 2024 World Championship.

The top two teams (except the host nation United States) qualified to compete at the 2028 Summer Olympics in Los Angeles. Gold medalists Canada, and bronze medalists Mexico were the teams that qualified.

== Venues ==
The championship will take place at Düsseldorf's flag football complex in Garath. The complex was inaugurated by the City of Düsseldorf and the New England Patriots in April 2025. Two fields are within the complex, which are the New England Patriots Flag Football Field and the Sebastian Vollmer Flag Football Field.

== Teams ==
=== Qualifiers ===
The International Federation of American Football introduced a new qualifying format for the Flag Football World Championships.

- 16 teams for each division (men's and women's)
- Host nation automatically qualifies
- Qualification via IFAF Continental Championships, in which the quotas are,
  - Europe: 6 berths
  - Americas: 4 berths
  - Asia-Oceania: 2 berths (one for each continent)
  - Africa: 1 berth
- Additional merit-based allocations for two continents based on past performances
- A maximum of six teams per continent (not including hosts)

Qualified teams
Continent	Qualifying tournament	Team	World ranking
Europe	Host nation	Germany	9
Europe	2025 IFAF Women's European Flag Football Championship	Italy	8
Europe	2025 IFAF Women's European Flag Football Championship	Austria	6
Europe	2025 IFAF Women's European Flag Football Championship	France	11
Europe	2025 IFAF Women's European Flag Football Championship	Great Britain	3
Europe	2025 IFAF Women's European Flag Football Championship	Spain	7
Europe	2025 IFAF Women's European Flag Football Championship	Slovenia	33
Americas	2025 IFAF Women's Americas Flag Football Championship	Mexico	1
Americas	2025 IFAF Women's Americas Flag Football Championship	United States	2
Americas	2025 IFAF Women's Americas Flag Football Championship	Canada	4
Americas	2025 IFAF Women's Americas Flag Football Championship	Panama	12
Americas	2025 IFAF Women's Americas Flag Football Championship	Brazil	15
Asia	2025 IFAF Women's Asia-Oceania Flag Football Championship	China	18
Asia	2025 IFAF Women's Asia-Oceania Flag Football Championship	Japan	5
Oceania	2025 IFAF Women's Asia-Oceania Flag Football Championship	Australia	10
Africa	2025 IFAF Women's Africa Flag Football Championship	Nigeria	29

2025 continental champions

=== Groups ===
The 16 teams are sorted into four groups of four based on the IFAF World Rankings in serpentine order.

Group A	Group B	Group C	Group D
Mexico (1)	United States (2)	Great Britain (3)	Canada (4)
Italy (8)	Spain (7)	Austria (6)	Japan (5)
Germany (hosts) (9)	Australia (10)	France (11)	Panama (12)
Slovenia (33)	Nigeria (29)	China (18)	Brazil (15)

On 10 August 2026, the Nigerian Federation of American Football informed the International Federation of American Football of their withdrawal due to the inability of the traveling delegation to secure the necessary visas in time for the tournament. As there was no time to replace Nigeria, all their matches were forfeited with a score of 1-0.

== Results ==
=== Preliminary round ===
==== Group A ====
Pos	Team	Pld	W	L	PF	PA	PD	Qualification	Mexico	Germany	Italy	Slovenia
1	Mexico	3	3	0	105	50	+55	Quarter-finals	—	38–14	14–12	53–24
2	Germany	3	2	1	101	93	+8	Quarter-finals	14–38	—	53–22	34–33
3	Italy	3	1	2	61	93	−32		12–14	22–53	—	27–26
4	Slovenia	3	0	3	83	114	−31		24–53	33–34	26–27	—

Updated to match(es) played on 14th August 2026. Source: IFAF World Flag 2026

==== Group B ====
Pos	Team	Pld	W	L	PF	PA	PD	Qualification	United States	Spain	Australia	Nigeria
1	United States	3	3	0	99	45	+54	Quarter-finals	—	52–31	46–14	1–0
2	Spain	3	2	1	71	77	−6	Quarter-finals	31–52	—	39–25	1–0
3	Australia	3	1	2	40	85	−45		14–46	25–39	—	1–0
4	Nigeria	3	0	3	0	3	−3		0–1	0–1	0–1	—

Updated to match(es) played on 14th August 2026. Source: IFAF World Flag 2026

==== Group C ====
Pos	Team	Pld	W	L	PF	PA	PD	Qualification	United Kingdom	Austria	People's Republic of China	France
1	Great Britain	3	3	0	106	65	+41	Quarter-finals	—	47–26	26–25	33–14
2	Austria	3	2	1	84	93	−9	Quarter-finals	26–47	—	35–27	23–19
3	China	3	1	2	78	81	−3		25–26	27–35	—	26–20
4	France	3	0	3	53	82	−29		14–33	19–23	20–26	—

Updated to match(es) played on 14th August 2026. Source: IFAF World Flag 2026

==== Group D ====
Pos	Team	Pld	W	L	PF	PA	PD	Qualification	Canada	Panama	Japan	Brazil
1	Canada	3	3	0	97	40	+57	Quarter-finals	—	27–14	34–20	36–6
2	Panama	3	2	1	63	46	+17	Quarter-finals	14–27	—	37–13	12–6
3	Japan	3	1	2	65	71	−6		20–34	13–37	—	32–0
4	Brazil	3	0	3	12	80	−68		6–36	6–12	0–32	—

Updated to match(es) played on 14th August 2026. Source: IFAF World Flag 2026

=== Championship round ===
Quarter-finals
15 August
Mexico	27
Spain	26
15 August
Canada	40
Austria	12
15 August
United States	35
Germany	34
15 August
Great Britain	26
Panama	20

Semi-finals
15 August
Mexico	6
Canada	20
15 August
United States	27
Great Britain	21

Final
16 August
Canada	27
United States	20
Bronze medal game
16 August
Mexico	20
Great Britain	19

=== Placement matches ===
==== 5th place bracket ====
5th-8th place semi-finals
15 August
Spain	32
Austria	42
15 August
Germany	33
Panama	14

5th place
16 August
Austria	6
Germany	34
7th place
16 August
Spain	27
Panama	38

==== 9th place bracket ====
First round
14 August
Australia	39
Slovenia	26
14 August
China	35
Brazil	27
14 August
Italy	1
Nigeria	0
14 August
Japan	40
France	21

9th-12th place semi-finals
15 August
Australia	8
China	46
15 August
Italy	24
Japan	41

9th place
16 August
China	27
Japan	14
11th place
16 August
Australia	20
Italy	26

==== 13th place bracket ====
13th-16th place semi-finals
15 August
Nigeria	0
France	1
15 August
Slovenia	40
Brazil	26

13th place
15 August
France	34
Slovenia	26
15th place
15 August
Nigeria	0
Brazil	1

== Final ranking ==
Rank	Team
1st place, gold medalist(s)	Canada
2nd place, silver medalist(s)	United States
3rd place, bronze medalist(s)	Mexico
4	Great Britain
5	Germany
6	Austria
7	Panama
8	Spain
9	China
10	Japan
11	Italy
12	Australia
13	France
14	Slovenia
15	Brazil
16	Nigeria

Qualified for the 2028 Summer Olympics.

== Television ==
In May 2026, streaming network DAZN acquired global broadcasting rights to all IFAF events in a multi-year agreement, including the women's world championship.

In Canada, all games are also broadcast on CBC Gem and the CBC Sports website.

== See also ==
- World Flag Düsseldorf 2026
- 2026 IFAF Men's Flag Football World Championship
