= 2025 IFAF Women's Asia-Oceania Flag Football Championship =

2025 IFAF Women's Asia Oceania Flag Football Championship
Tournament information
- Sport: Flag football
- Location: Ningbo
- Dates: 24–26 October
- Host: China
- Venue: 1
- Teams: 13

Final positions
- Champions: China
- Runner-up: Australia
- 3rd place: Japan

The 2025 IFAF Women's Asia-Oceania Flag Football Championship is the second edition of the IFAF Asia-Oceania Flag Football Championships, the continental tournament featuring national teams from IFAF Asia and IFAF Oceania. It will be held from 24 to 26 October, 2025 in Ningbo, China. The top three teams will qualify for the 2026 IFAF Women's Flag Football World Championship in Düsseldorf, Germany.

== Host selection ==
China was awarded the hosting rights for the tournament on July 24, 2025. The Asia Oceania tournament will be the second flag football tournament China will host after the women's flag football event at the 2025 World Games. The championships will mark China's first time of hosting a major International Federation of American Football (IFAF) event.

== Draw ==
Pool A	Pool B	Pool E
Japan	South Korea	New Zealand
Thailand	Malaysia	Australia
Indonesia	Philippines	American Samoa
Hong Kong	India	
China	Jordan	

== Group stage ==
=== Asia tournament ===
==== Group A ====
Pos	Team	Pld	W	L	PF	PA	PD	Qualification	Japan	People's Republic of China	Indonesia	Thailand	Hong Kong
1	Japan	4	4	0	174	59	+115	Semifinals	—	33–18	56–35	41–0	44–6
2	China (H)	4	3	1	147	85	+62	Semifinals	—	—	40–20	48–32	41–0
3	Indonesia	4	2	2	127	132	−5	5th–8th semifinals	—	—	—	33–24	39–12
4	Thailand	4	1	3	70	128	−58	5th–8th semifinals	—	—		—	14–6
5	Hong Kong	4	0	4	24	138	−114	Ninth place game	—	—	—	—	—

Source: IFAF
(H) Hosts

==== Group B ====
Pos	Team	Pld	W	L	PF	PA	PD	Qualification	Philippines	Malaysia	South Korea	Jordan	India
1	Philippines	4	4	0	144	18	+126	Semifinals	—	19–12	35–6	28–0	62–0
2	Malaysia	4	3	1	111	38	+73	Semifinals	—	—	32–7	33–0	34–12
3	South Korea	4	2	2	72	99	−27	5th–8th semifinals	—	—	—	25–12	34–20
4	Jordan	4	1	3	38	98	−60	5th–8th semifinals	—	—	—	—	26–12
5	India	4	0	4	44	156	−112	Ninth place game	—	—	—	—	—

Source: IFAF

=== Oceania tournament ===
==== Group C ====
Pos	Team	Pld	W	L	PF	PA	PD	Qualification	Australia	American Samoa	New Zealand
1	Australia	4	3	1	97	50	+47	Asia-Oceania final and 2026 World Championship	—	38–12	20–19
2	American Samoa	4	2	2	61	90	−29	Asia-Oceania third place playoff	6–27	—	21–12
3	New Zealand	4	1	3	57	75	−18		13–12	13–22	—

Source: IFAF

== Final round ==
=== Final bracket ===
Asia semifinals
A1	Japan	33
B2	Malaysia	0
B1	Philippines	6
A2	China	47

Asia final
A1	Japan	22
B2	China	25

Asia Oceania final
B2	China	36
C1	Australia	29
Asia Oceania third place
A1	Japan	42
C2	American Samoa	12

Asia bronze medal game
B2	Malaysia	19
B1	Philippines	13

Source: IFAF 1, 2

=== Consolation bracket ===
5th–8th playoffs
A3	Indonesia	53
B4	Jordan	0
B3	South Korea	0
A4	Thailand	46

Fifth place game
A3	Indonesia	41
B4	Thailand	20
Seventh place game
B4	Jordan	26
B3	South Korea	19

Ninth place medal game
A5	Hong Kong	27
B5	India	18

Source: IFAF 1, 2

== Standings ==
Asia		Oceania		Asia-Oceania	
Rank	Team	Rank	Team	Rank	Team
1	China	1	Australia	1st place, gold medalist(s)	China
2	Japan	2	American Samoa	2nd place, silver medalist(s)	Australia
3	Malaysia	3	New Zealand	3rd place, bronze medalist(s)	Japan
4	Philippines			4	American Samoa
5	Indonesia				
6	Thailand				
7	Jordan				
8	South Korea				
9	Hong Kong				
10	India				

Source: IFAF

== See also ==
- 2025 IFAF Men's Asia-Oceania Flag Football Championship
