= China women's national flag football team =

China

National team information
- Federation: Chinese Rugby and Football Association
- IFAF continental area: Asia

Championships
- Asia-Oceania Championships: 1 (1 overall): Asia tournament: 2025

The China women's national flag football team represents China in women's international flag football matches. They are governed by the Chinese Rugby and Football Association. In 2025, the International Federation of American Football (IFAF) ranked the team 18th worldwide.

In 2025, they were the host nation for the 2025 World Games and 2025 IFAF Women's Asia-Oceania Flag Football Championship, winning the latter.

== History ==
China was the host nation at the 2025 World Games held in Chengdu, Sichuan, where they reach the quarterfinals and lost to Mexico 40–0. They then made their continental debut at the 2025 IFAF Women's Asia-Oceania Flag Football Championship held in Ningbo, Zhejiang, where they were the host nation. There, they won the Asian tournament by defeating Japan 25–22, as well as the overall tournament by defeating Australia 36–29. This led them to qualify for the 2026 IFAF Women's Flag Football World Championship held in Düsseldorf, Germany, where they competed in Group C.
