= 2025 IFAF Women's European Flag Football Championship =

Flag football tournament in Val-de-Marne, France

Tournament details
- Host nation: France
- Dates: September 24, 2025 – September 27, 2025
- No. of nations: 19
- Champions: Great Britain
- Runner-up: Austria
- Third-place: Spain

The 2025 IFAF Women's European Flag Football Championship was the 10th Women's European Flag Football Championship. It was played between September 24 to September 27 at the Val-de-Marne Interdepartmental Sports Park, France.

Great Britain won its second consecutive Women's title with a 34-33 overtime victory over Austria.

== Tournament Groups ==
The 19 Women's national teams were divided into 3 groups of 5 and 1 group of 4, based on the then world rankings. The top two teams from each group will qualify for the knockout stage, while the remaining teams will play for their final ranking placement based on the results from the group stage, with a round robin for 17th-19th place.

Group A	Group B	Group C	Group D
Austria; Switzerland; Israel; Netherlands; Slovenia	Great Britain; Czech Republic; Finland; Ukraine; Turkey	Spain; France; Sweden; Poland; Norway	Germany; Italy; Denmark; Ireland

== Results ==
=== Group Stage ===
==== Group A ====
Pos	Team	Pld	W	L	PF	PA	PD	Qualification	Austria	Slovenia	Switzerland	Israel	Netherlands
1	Austria	4	3	1	170	65	+105	Knockout Stage	—	39–12	36–40	39–7	56–6
2	Slovenia	4	3	1	151	92	+59	Knockout Stage	12–39	—	51–13	33–22	55–18
3	Switzerland	4	3	1	133	115	+18		40–36	13–51	—	20–16	60–12
4	Israel	4	1	3	90	92	−2		7–39	22–33	16–20	—	45–0
5	Netherlands	4	0	4	36	216	−180		6–56	18–55	12–60	0–45	—

Updated to match(es) played on 27th September 2025. Source: https://web.archive.org/web/20251014042452/https://euroflag2025.com/en/live-scores/

==== Group B ====
Pos	Team	Pld	W	L	PF	PA	PD	Qualification	United Kingdom	Ukraine	Finland	Czech Republic	Turkey
1	Great Britain	4	4	0	130	47	+83	Knockout Stage	—	31–26	38–0	32–0	29–21
2	Ukraine	4	3	1	120	83	+37	Knockout Stage	26–31	—	34–14	27–6	33–32
3	Finland	4	1	3	73	117	−44		0–38	14–34	—	20–26	39–19
4	Czech Republic	4	1	3	44	113	−69		0–32	6–27	26–20	—	12–34
5	Turkey	4	1	3	106	113	−7		21–29	32–33	19–39	34–12	—

Updated to match(es) played on 27th September 2025. Source: https://web.archive.org/web/20251014042452/https://euroflag2025.com/en/live-scores/

==== Group C ====
Pos	Team	Pld	W	L	PF	PA	PD	Qualification	France	Spain	Sweden	Poland	Norway
1	France	4	4	0	189	53	+136	Knockout Stage	—	33–22	40–13	56–12	60–6
2	Spain	4	3	1	157	45	+112	Knockout Stage	22–33	—	43–6	34–0	58–6
3	Sweden	4	1	3	71	118	−47		13–40	6–43	—	14–27	38–8
4	Poland	4	1	3	57	130	−73		12–56	0–34	27–14	—	18–26
5	Norway	4	1	3	46	174	−128		6–60	6–58	8–38	26–18	—

Updated to match(es) played on 27th September 2025. Source: https://web.archive.org/web/20251014042452/https://euroflag2025.com/en/live-scores/

==== Group D ====
Pos	Team	Pld	W	L	PF	PA	PD	Qualification	Germany	Italy	Denmark	Ireland
1	Germany	3	3	0	164	12	+152	Knockout Stage	—	42–12	52–0	70–0
2	Italy	3	2	1	77	70	+7	Knockout Stage	12–42	—	26–6	39–22
3	Denmark	3	1	2	31	90	−59		0–52	6–26	—	25–12
4	Ireland	3	0	3	34	134	−100		0–70	22–39	12–25	—

Updated to match(es) played on 27th September 2025. Source: https://web.archive.org/web/20251014042452/https://euroflag2025.com/en/live-scores/

=== Knockout Stage ===
Quarterfinals
Austria	47
Ukraine	7
Spain	35
Germany	20
Slovenia	14
Great Britain	51
France	48
Italy	6

Semifinals
Austria	42
Spain	25
Great Britain	27
France	21

Finals
Austria	33
Great Britain	34
Third place
France	40
Spain	41

=== Ranking Stage ===
==== 5th Place Bracket ====
Semifinals
Germany	40
Ukraine	19
Slovenia	19
Italy	13

Fifth place
Germany	48
Slovenia	12
Seventh place
Ukraine	12
Italy	18

==== 9th-16th Placement Brackets ====
Quarterfinals
Switzerland	33
Poland	13
Turkey	20
Finland	19
Czech Republic	45
Denmark	12
Israel	33
Sweden	27

Semifinals
Switzerland	28
Turkey	21
Israel	20
Czech Republic	32

Ninth place
Switzerland	42
Czech Republic	27
Eleventh place
Turkey	46
Israel	14

Semifinals
Finland	46
Poland	12
Sweden	46
Denmark	33

Thirteenth place
Finland	14
Sweden	12
Fifteenth place
Poland	28
Denmark	32

==== 17th-19th Placement Round Robin ====
1	Ireland		41-0	44-6
2	Norway	0-41		25-20
3	Netherlands	6-44	20-25	

== Final Ranking ==
Gold medal	Great Britain
Silver medal	Austria
Bronze medal	Spain
4	France
5	Germany
6	Slovenia
7	Italy
8	Ukraine
9	Czech Republic
10	Switzerland
11	Turkey
12	Israel
13	Finland
14	Sweden
15	Denmark
16	Poland
17	Ireland
18	Norway
19	Netherlands

== See also ==
- 2025 IFAF Men's European Flag Football Championships
