= Manera =

Manera is a surname. Notable people with the surname include:

- Anthony S. Manera, President of the Canadian Broadcasting Corporation
- Paul Manera (born 1967), Australian player of American football
- Teresa Manera, Argentine paleontologist

== See also ==
- Eduardo Luján Manera (1944–2000), Argentine footballer and manager
