= American Tackle Football Federation of the Philippines =

- Sport: American football
- Abbreviation: ATFFP
- Founded: 2012
- Regional affiliation: IFAF Asia
- Headquarters: Makati, Philippines
- President: Joseph Pagulayan
- (Philippines)

The American Tackle Football Federation of the Philippines (ATFFP) is the governing body of American football in the Philippines.

== History ==
The American Tackle Football Federation of the Philippines (ATTFP) traces its roots to now defunct ArenaBall Philippines league founded in 2009 by Bernardo "Dodi" Palma II. The ATTFP itself was established in June 2012 by Palma, Apollo Angco and Jon Yamsuan.

The Philippine Olympic Committee recognized the ATFFP as the national sports association for American football in the Philippines on November 12, 2013. It also became a member of the International Federation of American Football (IFAF).

The ATTFP organized a Philippine national tackle football team which debuted in 2014. A men's flag football national team also debuted at the IFAF Asia Flag Football Championship in 2015.

The Flag Football Philippines (FFP) which was a separate organization established by Joseph Pagulayan in 2009 was integrated to the ATTFP in 2018, becoming the federation's flag football arm. In 2023, a Philippine women's national flag football team was formed.

== National teams ==
Tackle football

- Philippines national American football team

Flag football

- Philippines men's national flag football team
- Philippines women's national flag football team

== International competitions hosted ==
- 2016 IFAF Asia Flag Football Club Championship in Taguig.

== See also ==
- American football in the Philippines
- International Federation of American Football (IFAF)
