= Denmark national flag football team =

Denmark national flag football team could refer to:

- Denmark men's national flag football team
- Denmark women's national flag football team
