= Gaby Dela Merced =

Filipino racing driver (born 1982)

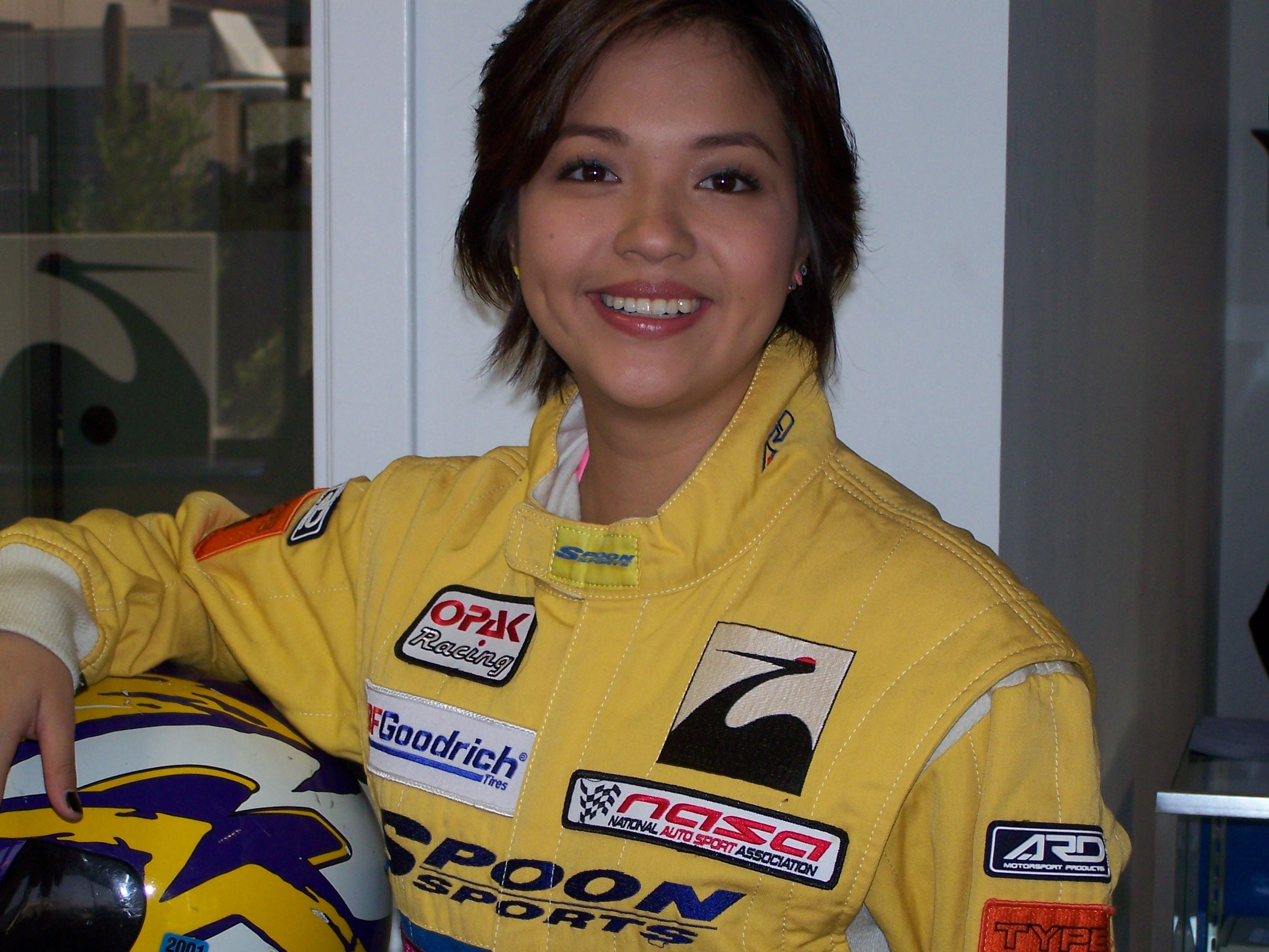
- Dela Merced in 2009

Personal information
- Born: Gabrielle Chanel dela Merced; August 10, 1982 (age 44)
- Home town: Quezon City
- Occupations: Racing driver; model; television personality; flag football player

Racing career
- Categorisation: FIA Bronze

Previous series
- 2020–22, 2024; 2019; 2019; 2008–2009; 2006; 2004; 2004; 2003; 2002–2003; 2000–2001: Makabayan Endurance Race Challenge Series; Giti-Formula V1 Challenge; TA2 Asia Racing; Western Endurance Racing; Asian Formula Three; Formula BMW Asia; Philippine Formula Toyota; Philippine BRC Production Touring Car; SVI Challenge Cup; Philippine Slalom

Sport
- Country: Philippines
- Sport: Flag football

Gabrielle Chanel dela Merced (born June 10, 1982) is a Filipina racing driver, model, television personality, and flag football player.

She has competed in multiple racing series, including Formula BMW Asia in 2004 and Asian Formula Three in 2006. In endurance racing, she has raced in the Western Endurance Racing Championship and the Makabayan Endurance Race Challenge Series.

She is also involved in entertainment, becoming a housemate in Pinoy Big Brother: Celebrity Edition 2. She hosted different shows and made multiple acting appearances.

She has also played for the Philippines women's national flag football team.

== Early life ==
Gabrielle Chanel dela Merced was born June 10, 1982. She is the fourth among six children.

== Career ==
=== Entertainment career ===
Dela Merced has appeared in television commercials promoting the Creamsilk conditioner and Carefree feminine wash lines. She was also an endorser of Goodyear, Standard Insurance, Oakley, Puma and Prestone.

Dela Merced was host at Slipstream of Studio 23 and Living It Up at QTV.

Dela Merced was part of the reality television series Pinoy Big Brother: Celebrity Edition 2 at ABS-CBN as a housemate. She made a voluntary exit in November 2007 to attend a driver's development program for international racing in Arizona.

Dela Merced hosted Gaby's Xtraordinary Files at ABS-CBN which premiered in 2008. She appeared in Kung Tayo'y Magkakalayo as Asha, one of the "Triple A" antagonists of the drama.

=== Racing career ===
Dela Merced first started racing at 16 years old.

In 1999, she raced in the Philippine Challenge, earning the Championship Cup.

In 2000, she participated in the Philippine Slalom Championship, earning class wins. She returned in 2001, earning class wins once more and becoming the Ladies Champion.

She competed in the Novice division of the SVI Challenge Cup that year, driving for Big Shot Billiards (Note: According to the Asian Formula Three website, in 2002, she competed in Philippine Touring Cars under the Novice Production Class, finishing 3rd overall. It is unclear whether this is also referring to the SVI Challenge Cup.) (Note: Her team has been cited as Big Shot Billiards, Bigshot Billiards/Butt Racing, Bigshot Billiards, and Bigshot Racing Team.) She achieved multiple class wins and podiums in this season.

She competed in Class C of the SVI Challenge Cup in 2003. (Note: According to the Asian Formula Three website, in 2003, she competed in the Philippine Petron Touring Car Series under the Production Class, finishing 2nd overall. It is unclear whether this is also referring to the SVI Challenge Cup.) (Note: Her team has been cited as Petron/Bigshot Billiards, Team Ultron, Petron Big Shot Billiards, and Team Ultron/Big Shots Billiards Honda.) She achieved multiple wins and podiums both overall and in her class. She also competed in the Philippine BRC Production Touring Car Championship in 2003, finishing 3rd overall.

In the Philippine Formula Toyota Championship in 2004, she placed 3rd overall. She was also one of the recipients of the Formula BMW Asia scholarship. Dela Merced competed in the 2004 Formula BMW Asia season, driving for Team T.E.C Pilipinas in the first four races and for Team E-Rain in the next four. She finished 15th overall and ranked 6th in the Rookie Cup.

In 2006, she competed in the Asian Formula Three Championship for Speedtech Asia. She finished 14th overall and had a highest race finish of seventh. She is also the runner-up in the Philippine National F3 standings of the championship. She is noted to be among the few Filipino women to race in the Asian Formula Three Championship and the only Filipino woman to complete a series.

In December 2008, Dela Merced made her endurance racing debut when she joined the NASA 25 Hours of Thunderhill. Along with Robbie Montinola and Angelo Barretto, Dela Merced co-drove for Team Castrol-Speed Trapp Racing. Driving a BMW M3, the trio finished 6th in the E0 class and 12th overall, out of 68 cars.

In March 2009, she tried out for Spoon Sports. She was signed and entered into the Western Endurance Racing Championship (WERC). Her teammate was Veronica Peyon. The first round was a 3-hour night race at Buttonwillow, where her team finished 4th. This was followed by a three-hour race at Llihrednuht (Thunderhill run backwards). Peyon suffered a heat stroke and had to abandon the race, so Dela Merced drove for the remaining two hours and eventually finished 2nd. She drove alone in the next 3-hour night race at Buttonwillow until the car suffered a gearbox failure, forcing her to abandon the race. The next race was at the Infineon Raceway, where she was joined by Tom Lepper who had replaced Peyon. They won the race. The last round was in Thunderhill, where there was a 6-hour points-awarding race that preceded the 25-hour non-points-scoring race that involved 68 cars. She was joined by Lepper, Ken Kurtz, and Charles Stowe in this round. In the end, the team ranked 2nd overall and 1st in the E0 class.

In 2019, she participated in TA2 Asia Racing for Tecpro Idemitsu Racing, becoming the first female driver for the series. In the 2019 Giti-Formula V1 Challenge, Dela Merced drove for Standard Insurance M1 Racing Team.

In November 2020, Dela Merced participated in the Bonifacio 8-Hours Endurance of the Makabayan Endurance Race Challenge Series held at the Clark International Speedway. She shared a team with Allan Uy and Marc Soong, driving an MG5. The team finished 8th overall while ranking as the first (and only) team in the Manufacturers' class.

She returned to the series in June 2021 driving for Team Mazda Philippines. The team, driving a Mazda MX-5 Miata Spec Series car, also comprised Allan Uy, Marc Soong, and Aaron Guevara. In the Kagitingan 4-hr Endurance Race, the team finished 1st overall as well as in the Open A and Class 1 classes. In the Kalayaan Cup 12-hr Endurance Race, the team once again were the winners overall and in the Open A and Class 1 classes.

In 2022, she was part of Team MSCC Mazda Miata, and was joined by Angie King and Tyson Sy. The team drove a Mazda MX-5 and finished 1st overall as well as in the Open A and Class 1 classes in the Bonifacio Cup 8-hr Endurance Race Challenge in November. Her team also won in the two aforementioned classes in a 4-hour race. (Note: It is unclear which race it is. The series has a four-hour Kagitingan Cup while the Bonifacio Cup 8-hr Endurance Challenge has a four-hour category.)

In April 2024, she joined the 2- and 4-hour races of the 4-hr Kagitingan Cup as a driver for Ethanworx-Crane Cat Racing 1 alongside Ethan Matthew Ong and Chenee Jimenez. The team did not finish either race. In the 4- and 8-hour races of the 8-hr Bonifacio Cup in November, she was entered as a driver for Ethanworx Motorsport alongside Pep Lo, Ethan Ong, Dodie Cabasal, and Chenee Jimenez. The team was listed to have entered with a Toyota 86. (Note: Ethanworx Motorsport is not in the list of entries in the results. Assuming their results are under Ethanworx-Cranecat Racing 1 (the entry sharing common team members), the result for the Bonifacio Cup is a DNF. It is unclear in which race(s) the team suffered the DNF.)

In May 2024, she participated in the first round of the 2024 MSCC Miata Spec Series held in Batangas Racing Circuit, as a guest driver driving for Shell Pro. She finished 2nd in Race 1 and 3rd in Race 2.

=== Flag football ===
Dela Merced became part of the Philippines women's national flag football team in late 2023. The team participated in the 2023 IFAF Women's Asia-Oceania Flag Football Championship and finished 6th.

== Racing record ==
=== Racing career summary ===
Season	Event	Team
2000	Philippine Slalom Championship	?
2001	Philippine Slalom Championship	?
2002	SVI Challenge Cup	Big Shot Billiards
2003	SVI Challenge Cup	Big Shot Billiards
2003	Philippine BRC Production Touring Car Championship	?
2004	Philippine Formula Toyota Championship	?
2004	Formula BMW Asia	Team T.E.C Pilipinas
2004	Formula BMW Asia	Team E-Rain
2006	Asian Formula Three Championship	Speedtech Asia
2008	Western Endurance Racing Championship	Team Castrol-Speed Trapp Racing
2009	Western Endurance Racing Championship	?
2019	TA2 Asia Racing	Tecpro Idemitsu Racing
2019	Giti-Formula V1 Challenge	Standard Insurance M1 Racing Team
2020	Makabayan Endurance Race Challenge Series	?
2021	Makabayan Endurance Race Challenge Series	Team Mazda Philippines
2022	Makabayan Endurance Race Challenge Series	Team MSCC Mazda Miata
2024	Makabayan Endurance Race Challenge Series	Ethanworx-Crane Cat Racing 1
2024	Makabayan Endurance Race Challenge Series	Ethanworx Motorsports
2024	MSCC Miata Spec Series	Shell Pro

=== Complete Formula BMW Asia results ===
(key) (Races in bold indicate pole position; races in italics fastest lap)

Year	Team	1	2	3	4	5	6	7	8	9	10	11	12	13	14	Rank	Points
2004	Team T.E.C Pilipinas	BHR; 1; 13	BHR; 2; 16	SEP; 1; 16	SEP; 2; 15											15th	1
2004	Team E-Rain					BIR; 1; 13	BIR; 2; 15	BEI; 1; 14	BEI; 2; 11	AUT; 1	AUT; 2	SIC; 1	SIC; 2	TAE; 1	TAE; 2	15th	1

=== Complete Asian Formula Three Championship results ===
(key)

Year	Team	1	2	3	4	5	6	7	8	9	10	11	12	13	14	15	16	17	18	Rank	Points
2006	Speedtech Asia	BAT1; 1; 11	BAT1; 2; 10	BAT1; 3; 12	ZZIC1; 1; 12	ZZIC1; 2; 8	ZZIC2; 1; 10	ZZIC2; 2; 8	ZZIC2; 3; 8	ZZIC2; 4; 12	SEN; 1 Ret	SEN; 2; 11	SEN; 3; 9	SEN; 4; 11	SEN; 5; 7	BAT2; 1; 10	BAT2; 2; 8	BAT1; 3; 10	BAT1; 4; 9	14th	20

== Filmography ==
=== Television ===
Year	Title	Role
2007	Living It Up	Host
2007	Slipstream	Host
2007	Pinoy Big Brother: Celebrity Edition 2	Celebrity Housemate
2008	Gaby's Xtraordinary Files	Host
2008–2014	Studio 23	VJ
2010	Kung Tayo'y Magkakalayo	Alina

=== Film ===
Year	Title	Role
2010	Rosario	Cameo (one of Rosario's friends watching in the zarzuela scene)
2010	Shake, Rattle & Roll 12	Anna

== Awards ==
- 2007: 21st PMPC Star Awards - Best Lifestyle Show Hosts (shared with Raymond Gutierrez, Tim Yap, Issa Litton)
- 2008: Pinoy Big Brother Celebrity Edition 2 (3rd Big Placer)
