= 2023 IFAF Women's Asia-Oceania Flag Football Championship =

2023 IFAF Women's Asia Oceania Flag Football Championship
Tournament information
- Sport: Flag football
- Location: Shah Alam
- Dates: 27–29 October
- Host: Malaysia
- Venue: 1
- Teams: 9

Final positions
- Champions: Japan
- Runner-up: Australia
- 3rd place: New Zealand

The 2023 IFAF Women's Asia Oceania Flag Football Championship is the inaugural edition of the IFAF Asia-Oceania Flag Football Championships, the continental tournament featuring national flag football teams from IFAF Asia and IFAF Oceania. It was held from 27 to 29 October 2023 at the EV Arena in Shah Alam, Malaysia.

Japan became the inaugural champions.

== Preliminary round ==
=== Group A ===
Pos	Team	Pld	W	L	PF	PA	PD	Qualification	Japan	Australia	Thailand	Indonesia	South Korea
1	Japan	4	4	0	193	25	+168	Semifinals	—	33–0	60–19	61–6	39–0
2	Australia	4	3	1	126	85	+41	Quarterfinals	0–33	—	34–19	39–27	53–6
3	Thailand	4	2	2	104	116	−12	Quarterfinals	19–60	19–34	—	27–22	39–0
4	Indonesia	4	1	3	96	133	−37	7th place match	6–61	27–39	22–27	—	41–6
5	South Korea	4	0	4	12	172	−160	8th place match	0–39	6–53	0–39	6–41	—

Source: JAFA

=== Group B ===
Pos	Team	Pld	W	L	PF	PA	PD	Qualification	Malaysia	New Zealand	Philippines	India
1	Malaysia	3	3	0	95	25	+70	Semifinals	—	13–7	41–0	41–18
2	New Zealand	3	2	1	91	19	+72	Quarterfinals	7–13	—	32–0	52–6
3	Philippines	3	1	2	25	85	−60	Quarterfinals	0–41	0–32	—	25–12
4	India	3	0	3	36	118	−82	7th place match	18–41	6–52	12–25	—

Source: JAFA

== Playoffs ==
=== Classification ===
Fifth place
QF1	Thailand	20
QF2	Philippines	13
Seventh place
A4	Indonesia	41
B4	India	14

Tenth place
A5	South Korea	L
7P	India	W

Source: IFAF, 2

=== Final ===
The top teams from each group received a bye to the semifinals.

Quarterfinals
B2	New Zealand	42
A3	Thailand	14
B2	Australia	36
A3	Philippines	0

Semifinals
A1	Japan	42
B2	New Zealand	14
B2	Australia	35
A2	Malaysia	7

Finals
A1	Japan	47
B1	Australia	29
Third place
B2	New Zealand	20
A2	Malaysia	13

Source: IFAF, 2

== Standings ==
Rank	Team
1st place, gold medalist(s)	Japan
2nd place, silver medalist(s)	Australia
3rd place, bronze medalist(s)	New Zealand
4	Malaysia
5	Thailand
6	Philippines
7	Indonesia
8	India
9	South Korea

Source: IFAF

== See also ==
- 2023 IFAF Men's Asia-Oceania Flag Football Championship
