= Australia women's national flag football team =

Australia

National team information
- Federation: Gridiron Australia
- IFAF continental area: Oceania

Championships
- Asia-Oceania Championships: 0 (no overall): Oceania tournament: 2025

The Australia women's national flag football team represents Australia in women's international flag football matches. They are governed by Gridiron Australia. In 2025, the International Federation of American Football (IFAF) ranked the team 10th worldwide.

Paul Manera is head coach.

== History ==
The Australia women's national flag football team made their debut at the 2023 IFAF Women's Asia-Oceania Flag Football Championship in Malaysia. Australia lost to Japan in the final. The team took 16th place at the 2024 IFAF Women's Flag Football World Championship.
