= IFAF Asia-Oceania Flag Football Championships =

- Sport: Flag football
- Founded: 2023
- Most recent champions: Australia (men); China (women)
- Most titles: Australia; Thailand (men; 1 title each); Japan; China (women; 1 title each)

The IFAF Asia-Oceania Flag Football Championships is an international flag football tournament for national teams of IFAF Asia and IFAF Oceania.

It replaced the IFAF Asia Flag Football Championship

== History ==
The first IFAF Asia-Oceania Flag Football Championships was held in Shah Alam, Malaysia in 2023. It was established as the Asia and Oceania tournament of IFAF's biannual Continental Championships and the qualification method for the IFAF Flag Football World Championships.

The second edition was held in Ningbo, China in October 2025.

== Results ==
=== Asia-Oceania tournament ===
==== Men ====
Year	Host	Gold medal game			Bronze medal game		
Year	Host	Gold	Score	Silver	Bronze	Score	Fourth place
2023; Details	(Malaysia); Shah Alam	Thailand	31–21	New Zealand	Japan	38–7	Australia
2025; Details	(China); Ningbo	Australia	23–19	Japan	American Samoa	41–34	China

==== Women ====
Year	Host	Gold medal game			Bronze medal game		
Year	Host	Gold	Score	Silver	Bronze	Score	Fourth place
2023; Details	(Malaysia); Shah Alam	Japan	47–29	Australia	New Zealand	20–13	Malaysia
2025; Details	(China); Ningbo	China	36–29	Australia	Japan	42–12	American Samoa

=== Asia tournament ===
==== Men ====
Year	Host	Asia final			Asia third place game		
Year	Host	First place	Score	Second place	Third place	Score	Fourth place
2023; Details	(Malaysia); Shah Alam	No separate Asian tournament					
2025; Details	(China); Ningbo	Japan	40–39	China	Thailand	32–20	Indonesia

==== Women ====
Year	Host	Asia final			Asia third place game		
Year	Host	First place	Score	Second place	Third place	Score	Fourth place
2023; Details	(Malaysia); Shah Alam	No separate Asian tournament					
2025; Details	(China); Ningbo	China	25–22	Japan	Malaysia	19–13	Philippines

=== Oceania tournament ===
==== Men ====
Year	Host	Oceania final			Oceania third place game		
Year	Host	First place	Score	Second place	Third place	Score	Fourth place
2023; Details	(Malaysia); Shah Alam	No separate Oceanian tournament					
2025; Details	(China); Ningbo	Australia	Double round robin	American Samoa	New Zealand	Double round robin	No other teams

==== Women ====
Year	Host	Oceania final			Oceania third place game		
Year	Host	First place	Score	Second place	Third place	Score	Fourth place
2023; Details	(Malaysia); Shah Alam	No separate Oceanian tournament					
2025; Details	(China); Ningbo	Australia	Double round robin	American Samoa	New Zealand	Double round robin	No other teams
