= IFAF European Flag Football Championship =

List of flag football championships

IFAF EuroFlag, IFAF Europe coordinates a flag football championship for men, women, and juniors. The contest is held every two years, alternating with the IFAF Flag Football World Championship. The event provides qualification to the World Championship.

== Men ==
=== Results ===
Year	Host country	Gold medal game			Bronze medal game		
Year	Host country	Gold	Score	Silver	Bronze	Score	Fourth place
2003; Details	Austria	Austria	32–6	Germany	Denmark	21–20	Sweden
2005; Details	Finland	France	24–7	Italy	Great Britain	21-20	Austria
2007; Details	Italy	France	19–0	Germany	Denmark	21–6	Austria
2009; Details	Northern Ireland	Denmark	25–13	Italy	Austria	34–19	Germany
2011; Details	France	Denmark	60–21	Austria	France	35–25	Germany
2013; Details	Italy	Denmark	33–21	Italy	Austria	41–27	Israel
2015; Details	Spain	Denmark	52–8	Austria	Germany	39–34	Israel
2017; Details	Denmark	Denmark	39–19	Israel	Great Britain	19–12	Sweden
2019; Details	Israel	Denmark	52–35	Italy	France	56–49	Israel
2023; Details	(Republic of Ireland); Ireland	Germany	36-28	Austria	Israel	42-8	Denmark
2025; Details	Paris, France	Italy	27-19	Austria	France	34-20	Great Britain

=== Medal table ===
Rank	Nation	Gold	Silver	Bronze	Total
1	Denmark	6	0	2	8
2	France	2	0	3	5
3	Austria	1	4	2	7
4	Italy	1	4	0	5
5	Germany	1	2	1	4
6	Israel	0	1	1	2
7	Great Britain	0	0	2	2
Totals (7 entries)		11	11	11	33

== Women ==
=== Results ===
Year	Host country	Gold medal game			Bronze medal game		
Year	Host country	Gold	Score	Silver	Bronze	Score	Fourth place
2005; Details	Finland	Finland	39–7	France	Sweden	31–7	Israel
2007; Details	Italy	France	25–12	Finland	Austria	18-14	Sweden
2009; Details	Northern Ireland	Austria	35–33	Finland	Israel	39–32	France
2011; Details	France	Austria	31–12	Israel	France	41–34	Germany
2013; Details	Italy	Austria	20–12	France	Israel	35–25	Denmark
2015; Details	Spain	Austria	45–15	France	Germany	24–12	Israel
2017; Details	Denmark	Denmark	33–6	Israel	Great Britain	34–6	Finland
2019; Details	Israel	Spain	28–14	Great Britain	Austria	34–19	Denmark
2023; Details	(Republic of Ireland); Ireland	Great Britain	26-19	Spain	Germany	45–14	France
2025; Details	France	Great Britain	34-33	Austria	Spain	41–40	France

=== Medal table ===
Rank	Nation	Gold	Silver	Bronze	Total
1	Austria	4	1	2	7
2	Great Britain	2	1	1	4
3	France	1	3	1	5
4	Finland	1	2	0	3
5	Spain	1	1	1	3
6	Denmark	1	0	0	1
7	Israel	0	2	2	4
8	Germany	0	0	2	2
9	Sweden	0	0	1	1
Totals (9 entries)		10	10	10	30

== See also ==
- European Championship of American football
- NFL Europe
