= 2015 IFAF World Championship qualification =

This article describes the qualification for the 2015 IFAF World Championship. The final tournament was to be contested by twelve teams, but five teams that later qualify withdrew from the tournament. Sweden qualified automatically as original hosts of the tournament but was among the teams that withdrew. The United States hosted the tournament instead and would have still automatically qualified as the defending world champions if Sweden did not withdraw from the tournament.

== Asian qualifiers ==
=== South Korea vs. Kuwait ===
Kuwait at Korea

| Team | 1 | 2 | 3 | 4 | Total |
|---|---|---|---|---|---|
| Kuwait | 0 | 7 | 0 | 0 | 7 |
| • South Korea | 21 | 14 | 20 | 14 | 69 |

- Date: April 12
- Location: Mokdong Baseball Stadium, Seoul, South Korea
- Game start: 3:30 PM
- Elapsed time: 3:50

The Kuwait Gridiron Football National team lost the first Asian World Championship Qualifier against Korea by a score of 69–7.

Scoring summary

| Quarter | Time | Drive | | | Team | Scoring information | Score | |
| Quarter | Time | Plays | Yards | TOP | Team | Scoring information | (Kuwait) | (South Korea) |
|---|---|---|---|---|---|---|---|---|
| "TOP" = time of possession. For other American football terms, see Glossary of American football. | | | | | | | 7 | 69 |

=== Japan vs. Philippines ===
Japan defeated Philippines 86–0 in Tokyo to secure a spot in the final tournament.

Philippines at Japan

| Team | 1 | 2 | 3 | 4 | Total |
|---|---|---|---|---|---|
| Philippines | 0 | 0 | 0 | 0 | 0 |
| • Japan | 30 | 14 | 21 | 21 | 86 |

- Date: April 26
- Location: VITAL Field, Tokyo, Japan
- Game start: 1:00 PM
- Elapsed time: 3:50
- Game attendance: 931

Scoring summary

| Quarter | Time | Drive | | | Team | Scoring information | Score | |
| Quarter | Time | Plays | Yards | TOP | Team | Scoring information | (Philippines) | (Japan) |
|---|---|---|---|---|---|---|---|---|
| 1 | 0:16 | | | | Japan | Yasuhiro Miyamoto 56-yard touchdown reception from Shun Sugawara, Eita Saeki kick good | 0 | 7 |
| 1 | 2:40 | | | | Japan | Akimitsu Mori 24-yard touchdown reception from Shun Sugawara, Eita Saeki kick good | 0 | 14 |
| 1 | 4:51 | | | | Japan | Shoma Endo 9-yard touchdown reception from Shohei Kato, Eita Saeki kick good | 0 | 21 |
| 1 | 5:45 | | | | Japan | Michael Hoese tackled in end zone for a safety by Toru Hirasawa | 0 | 23 |
| 1 | 10:44 | | | | Japan | Tomoaki Ohashi 5-yard touchdown reception from Shohei Kato, Eita Saeki kick good | 0 | 30 |
| 2 | 1:45 | 1 | 36 | | Japan | Eisuke Tomatsu 36-yard punt return for a touchdown, Eita Saeki kick good | 0 | 37 |
| 2 | 10:10 | | | | Japan | Eisuke Tomatsu 2-yard touchdown run, Eita Saeki kick good | 0 | 44 |
| 3 | 4:46 | | | | Japan | Takashi Miyako 28-yard touchdown run, Eita Saeki kick good | 0 | 51 |
| 3 | 7:11 | 1 | 14 | | Japan | Fumble recovery returned 14 yards for touchdown by Keisaburo Isokawa, Eita Saeki kick good | 0 | 58 |
| 3 | 11:12 | 1 | 62 | | Japan | Interception returned 62 yards for touchdown by Hidetoshi Yano, Eita Saeki kick good | 0 | 65 |
| 4 | 3:53 | | | | Japan | Tomoaki Ohashi 1-yard touchdown run, Yasuhiro Miyamoto kick good | 0 | 72 |
| 4 | 7:59 | | | | Japan | Eisuke Tomatsu 4-yard touchdown run, Yasuhiro Miyamoto kick good | 0 | 79 |
| 4 | 11:02 | | | | Japan | Takashi Miyako 7-yard touchdown run, Yasuhiro Miyamoto kick good | 0 | 86 |
| "TOP" = time of possession. For other American football terms, see Glossary of American football. | | | | | | | 0 | 86 |

== 2014 European Championship ==
The European participants won a seed in the tournament by finishing top-3 in the 2014 EFAF European Championship.

=== Germany vs. Austria ===
Austria at Germany

| Team | 1 | 2 | 3 | 4 | OT | Total |
|---|---|---|---|---|---|---|
| Austria | 0 | 9 | 0 | 8 | 10 | 27 |
| • Germany | 14 | 0 | 0 | 3 | 13 | 30 |

- Date: June 7
- Location: Ernest Happel Stadium, Vienna, Austria
- Game start: 19:00 PM
- Elapsed time: 3:30
- Game attendance: 27.000

The first seed is for Germany for being the champion and the second is Austria who was the runner-up. Both teams played the gold medal game were the defending champion Germany won during overtime the host team Austria by a score of 30 to 27.

- Box score

Scoring summary

| Quarter | Time | Drive | | | Team | Scoring information | Score | |
| Quarter | Time | Plays | Yards | TOP | Team | Scoring information | (Austria) | (Germany) |
|---|---|---|---|---|---|---|---|---|
| 1 | 02:36 | 1 | 26 | | Germany | Niklas Römer 26-yard touchdown reception from Marco Ehrenfried, Jan Hilgenfeldt kick good | 0 | 7 |
| 1 | 01:38 | 1 | 20 | | Germany | Fumble recovery returned 20 yards for touchdown by Maximilian Wild, Jan Hilgenfeldt kick good | 0 | 14 |
| 2 | 02:02 | 14 | 94 | | Austria | 37-yard field goal by Christopher Kappel | 3 | 14 |
| 2 | 00:28 | 4 | 29 | | Austria | Laurinho Walch 19-yard touchdown reception from Christoph Gross, Christopher Kappel kick no good | 9 | 14 |
| 4 | 10:42 | 11 | 80 | | Austria | Philipp Margreiter 1-yard touchdown run, 2-point run good | 17 | 14 |
| 4 | 04:11 | 9 | 63 | | Germany | 25-yard field goal by Jan Hilgenfeldt | 17 | 17 |
| OT | | 4 | 25 | | Germany | Dominic Hanselmann 11-yard touchdown reception from Marco Ehrenfried, Jan Hilgenfeldt kick good | 17 | 24 |
| OT | | 3 | 25 | | Austria | Christoph Gross 9-yard touchdown reception from C. Stefani, Christopher Kappel kick good | 24 | 24 |
| OT | | 4 | 9 | | Austria | 32-yard field goal by Christopher Kappel | 27 | 24 |
| OT | | 7 | 25 | | Germany | Niklas Römer 7-yard touchdown reception from Marco Ehrenfried, kick no good | 27 | 30 |
| "TOP" = time of possession. For other American football terms, see Glossary of American football. | | | | | | | 27 | 30 |

=== Finland vs. France ===
France at Finland

| Team | 1 | 2 | 3 | 4 | Total |
|---|---|---|---|---|---|
| • France | 7 | 7 | 14 | 7 | 35 |
| Finland | 0 | 7 | 0 | 14 | 21 |

- Date: June 7
- Location: Ernst Happel Stadium, Vienna, Austria
- Game start: 14:00 PM
- Elapsed time: 3:30
- Game attendance: 15.000

The last seed was for the third place France by beating Finland during the European Championship bronze medal game with a score of 35 to 21.

- Box score

Scoring summary

| Quarter | Time | Drive | | | Team | Scoring information | Score | |
| Quarter | Time | Plays | Yards | TOP | Team | Scoring information | (France) | (Finland) |
|---|---|---|---|---|---|---|---|---|
| 1 | 02:58 | 11 | 77 | | France | Stephen Yepmo 1-yard touchdown run, Boris Bede kick good | 7 | 0 |
| 2 | 08:20 | 6 | 80 | | Finland | Veikka Lehtonen 4-yard touchdown run, Akseli Olin kick good | 7 | 7 |
| 2 | 01:14 | 7 | 84 | | France | Guillaume Rioux 45-yard touchdown reception from Perez Mattison, Boris Bede kick good | 14 | 7 |
| 3 | 09:57 | 5 | 58 | | France | Steve Delaval 27-yard touchdown reception from Perez Mattison, Boris Bede kick good | 21 | 7 |
| 3 | 01:19 | 2 | 69 | | France | Guillaume Rioux 57-yard touchdown reception from Perez Mattison, Boris Bede kick good | 28 | 7 |
| 4 | 11:55 | 4 | 75 | | Finland | Ville Kurvinen 23-yard touchdown reception from Miro Kadmiry, Akseli Olin kick good | 28 | 14 |
| 4 | 10:40 | 3 | 83 | | France | Anthony Dable 56-yard touchdown run, Boris Bede kick good | 35 | 14 |
| 4 | 02:29 | 5 | 22 | | Finland | Aappo Saloranta 10-yard touchdown reception from Miro Kadmiry, Akseli Olin kick good | 35 | 21 |
| "TOP" = time of possession. For other American football terms, see Glossary of American football. | | | | | | | 35 | 21 |

== African qualifiers ==
=== Egypt vs. Morocco ===
Morocco at Egypt

| Team | 1 | 2 | 3 | 4 | Total |
|---|---|---|---|---|---|
| • Morocco | 8 | 0 | 6 | 12 | 26 |
| Egypt | 0 | 0 | 6 | 0 | 6 |

- Date: December 13
- Location: German University in Cairo Stadium, Cairo, Egypt
- Game start: 15:00 PM

This was the first participation of Africa on the IFAF World Championship competition. The qualifier was decided in one game on December 13, 2014, between the two teams Egypt and Morocco. It was held in Cairo, Egypt. Morocco won against Egypt with score of 26-6.

Scoring summary

| Quarter | Time | Drive | | | Team | Scoring information | Score | |
| Quarter | Time | Plays | Yards | TOP | Team | Scoring information | (Morocco) | (Egypt) |
|---|---|---|---|---|---|---|---|---|
| 1 | | | | | Morocco | Mohamed Amouh -yard touchdown run, 2-point PassTD good | 0 | 8 |
| 3 | | | | | Egypt | Mo'men Naiem -yard touchdown reception from {{{QB}}}, kick no good | 6 | 8 |
| 3 | | | | | Morocco | Mohamed Amouh -yard touchdown run, kick no good | 6 | 14 |
| 4 | | | | | Morocco | Ahmed ABDELFETAH -yard touchdown run, kick no good | 6 | 20 |
| 4 | | | | | Morocco | Othmane ZAATRI -yard touchdown run, kick no good | 6 | 26 |
| "TOP" = time of possession. For other American football terms, see Glossary of American football. | | | | | | | 26 | 6 |

== American qualifiers ==
The United States qualified automatically as the 2011 IFAF World Championship winners.

IFAF Americas had three more spots; the first two were represented by Canada and Mexico respectively, and these countries qualified directly by finishing second and fourth at the last World Championship.

=== Panama vs. Brazil ===
Brazil at Panama

| Team | 1 | 2 | 3 | 4 | Total |
|---|---|---|---|---|---|
| • Brazil | 7 | 7 | 6 | 6 | 26 |
| Panama | 7 | 0 | 7 | 0 | 14 |

- Date: January 31, 2015
- Location: Rommel Fernández Stadium, Panama City, Panama
- Game start: 18:00 PM

Panama as the champion of the Central American Bowl played a game for the last seed in the road to the IFAF World Championship 2015, facing the national team of Brazil. The game was held on January 31, 2015, being Panama the host nation. Brazil won against Panama with score of 26-14.
