= Philippine Tackle Football League =

- Formerly: ArenaBall Philippines
- Sport: American football
- Founded: 2009
- First season: 2010
- Folded: 2015
- No. of teams: 5 (2015)
- Country: Philippines
- Last champion: Wolves (1st title)
- Most titles: Bandits (4 titles)
- Broadcasters: IBC 13 (2015)

ArenaBall Philippines (ABP), known as the Philippine Tackle Football League (PTFL) in its last season in 2015, was an American football league in the Philippines. The last champions were the Wolves which won a season and the Bandits held the most titles, winning four seasons.

== History ==
Logo as ArenaBall Philippines (2015)

The Philippine Tackle Football League was launched as the ArenaBall Philippines (ABP) on December 12, 2009, by founder Bernardo "Dodi" A. Palma at the University of Santo Tomas Field. ABP started as a 7-a-side league with four teams; the Bandits, Barracudas, Juggernauts and the Wolves. The Bandits were the champions of the inaugural 2010 season.

By the third season, the ABP is already a full 11-a-side league. The Bandits won their fourth title in the fourth season in 2014. 2014–15 champions, the Wolves are the other team to win a title.

In 2015, ABP was rebranded as the Philippine Tackle Football League (PTFL). The PhilSports Stadium became the PTFL's home venue and the Tigers and Renegades joined. IBC 13 became the official television broadcaster. The Tigers withdrew mid-season

However, due to a dispute regarding two cancelled games and the financial setup of the league, the five remaining teams withdrew. They held the two canceled games and the championships outside the league's auspices. The Wolves defeated the Bandits in the unofficial championships held at the Acacia field in Manila in December 2015.

The league effectively folded in December 2015. It was succeeded by the Philippine-American Football League which was organized in 2016.

== Teams ==
- Bandits (Season 1–6)
- Barracudas (Season 1)
- Juggernauts (Season 1–5)
- Knights
- Rebels (Season 2–5)
- Renegades (Season 6)
- Wolves
- Vanguards (Season 5–6)

== ArenaBowl ==
The following are the results of the ArenaBowl or the league final.

Season		Champions	Score	Runners-up	Ref.
1	2010	Bandits			
2	2011	Bandits	14–6	Juggernauts	
3	2012	Bandits	25–8	Juggernauts	
4	2013	Bandits	14–6	Juggernauts	
5	2014–15	Wolves	16–0	Bandits	
6	2015	Cancelled			

== League winners and runners-up ==
Team	Champions	Years won	Runners-up	Years lost
Bandits	4	2010, 2011, 2012, 2013–14	1	2014–15
Wolves	1	2014–15	0	None
Juggernauts	0	None	3	2011, 2012, 2013–14

== Most Valuable Players ==
- 2010 – Will Yeh (Bandits)
- 2011 – Paul Reyes (Juggernauts)
- 2012 – Johnny Babaran (Juggernauts)
- 2013–14: ?
- 2015: Ivan Klaric (Wolves)

== See also ==
- American Tackle Football Federation of the Philippines
- Philippine–American Football League
- Philippines national American football team
