= Philippines women's national flag football team =

Philippines
Logo

National team information
- Federation: American Tackle Football Federation of the Philippines
- IFAF continental area: Asia

Personnel
- Head coach: (United States) Melinda Nguyen

Nickname
- Agila Pilipinas

The Philippines women's national flag football team represents the Philippines in women's international flag football matches.

== History ==
The Philippines women's national flag football team or Agila Pilipinas was formed in 2023, with its roster mostly consisting of beginners. They made their international debut at the inaugural 2023 IFAF Women's Asia Oceania Flag Football Championship in Malaysia, finishing in 6th place.

== Players ==
=== Current squad ===
The following are players for the 2023 IFAF Asia Oceania Flag Football Championships.

- 1 – Nina Juan
- 2 – Vikki Luta
- 3 – Althea Payumo
- 7 – Cath Roa
- 10 – Nerisse Buenconsejo
- 12 – Gaby Dela Merced
- 17 – Vida Gonzales
- 27 – Iris Dizon
- 21 – Anj Collanto
- 30 – Bea Ignacio
- 35 – Nikki Manalo
- 51 – Liz Zamora

== Competitive record ==
=== IFAF Flag Football World Championship ===
Year	Position	GP	W	L	PF	PA
(Finland) 2024	Did not qualify					

=== Olympic Games ===
Year	Position	GP	W	L	PF	PA
(United States) 2028	To be determined					

=== World Games ===
Year	Position	GP	W	L	PF	PA
(China) 2025	Did not qualify					

=== IFAF Asia Oceania Flag Football Championship ===
Year	Position	GP	W	L	PF	PA
(Malaysia) 2023	6th place	5	1	4	38	141
(China) 2025	To be determined					

== Head coaches ==
- (United States) Melinda Nguyen (2025)
