= Japan American Football Association =

Governing body of American football in Japan

- Formation: 1934
- Type: Non-profit
- Headquarters: Tokyo
- Location: Japan
- Official language: Japanese
- Website: americanfootball.jp

The Japan American Football Association (JAFA) is the governing body of gridiron football in Japan which oversees middle school, high school, collegiate, club, and even corporate teams. It was founded in 1934.

Since 1984, JAFA has organized and sponsored the Rice Bowl, a championship game played between the Japanese college national champion and the X-League champion. It also organizes the Japan national American football teams.

== History ==
Established in 1934, the JAFA consists of approximately 390 teams. JAFA has three different football leagues made up of 64 corporate-sponsored professional teams, 220 university teams, and 106 high school teams.

== See also ==
- International Federation of American Football (IFAF)
- IFAF Asia
