= Philippine–American Football League =

Professional American football league in The Philippines

- Sport: American football
- Founded: 2016
- First season: 2016–17
- Folded: 2020
- No. of teams: 5–12
- Country: Philippines
- Last champion: Datu (1st title) (2019)
- Most titles: Wolves (2 titles)
- Broadcaster: ESPN

The Philippine–American Football League (PAFL) was an American football league in the Philippines. Organized in 2016, it succeeded the Philippine Tackle Football League. It stopped in 2020 due to the COVID-19 pandemic.

== History ==
The Philippine–American Football League was launched in 2016 replacing the Philippine Tackle Football League which was disestablished at the end of 2015. The league started with five teams for its inaugural season. It peaked in its fourth season in 2019, which was participated by 12 teams.

The league was halted in 2020 due to the COVID-19 pandemic.

== Finals ==
Season		Champions	Score	Runners-up	Ref.
1	2016–17	Manila Rough Riders	22–20	Taguig Wolf Pack	
2	2017	Wolves	22–16	Cavemen	
3	2018	Wolves	37–20	Cavemen	
4	2019	Datu Tribe	34–29	Wolves	

== League winners and runners-up ==
Team	Championships	Years won	Runners-up	Years lost
Wolves	2	2017, 2018	1	2019
Datu	1	2019	0	None
Rough Raiders	1	2016–17	0	None
Cavemen	0	None	2	2017, 2018
Wolfpack	0	None	1	2016
