= Philippines national American football team =

Philippines
Logo

General information
- Colors: Blue, red, yellow

Nickname
- All-Star Aguilas

Current uniform

The Philippines national American football team or the Philippines national tackle football team represented the Philippines in international American football competitions. The team was organized under the American Tackle Football Federation of the Philippines (ATFFP), which was founded by Bernaro "Dodi" Palma II in 2009.

== History ==
=== Early history ===
American Football has been in the Philippines since as early as 2001, with the flag football variant being introduced first. A flag football league was established, with its teams defeating other teams from China and Singapore. Around 2010, tackle football was introduced with a league on the standard variant of football being established by then. An international club team called the Philippine Punishers was formed which defeated teams from China, Hong Kong, and Saipan.

=== Debut as the Philippine Aguilas ===
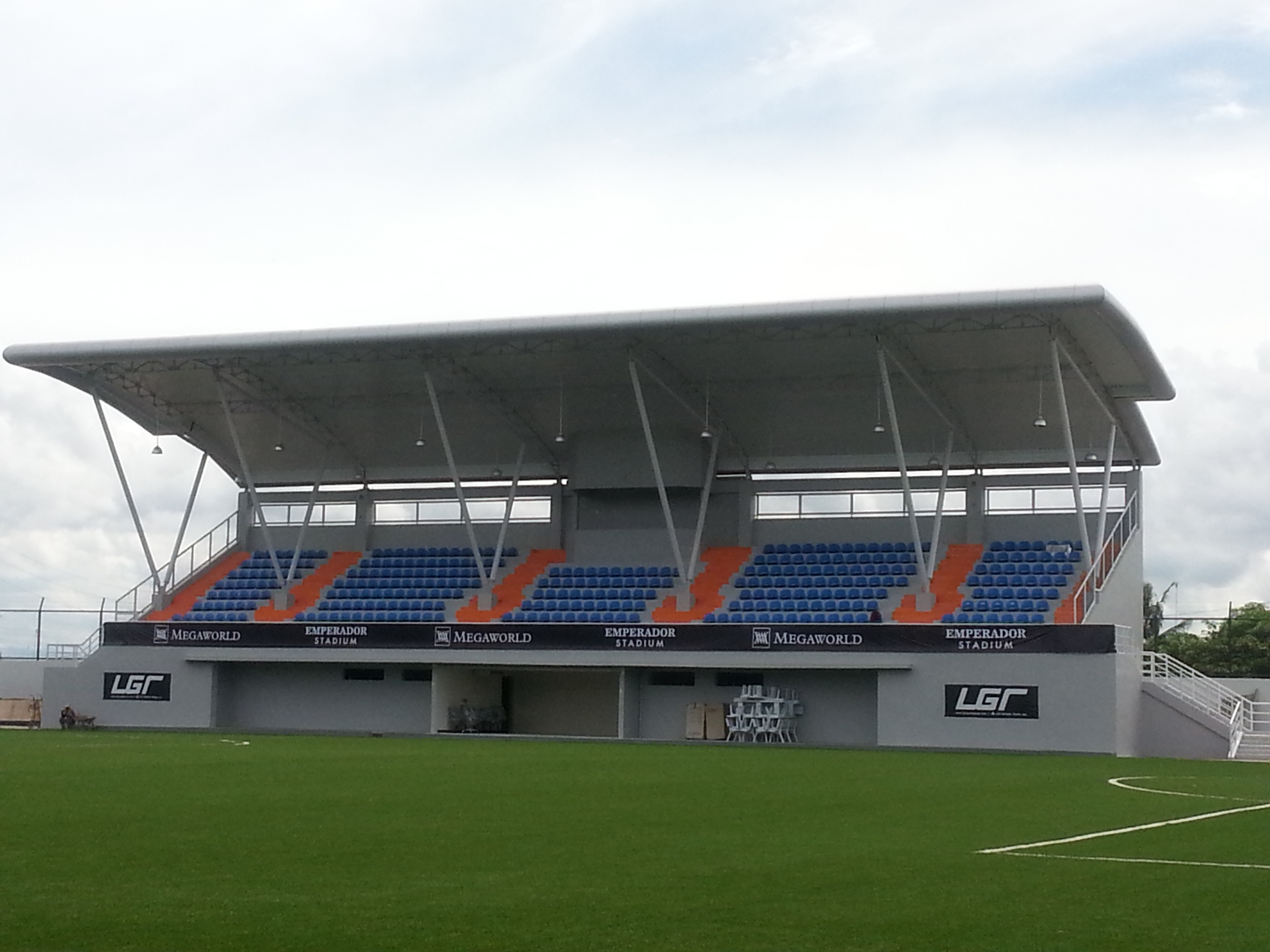
The Philippines hosted its first international friendly at home at the Emperador Stadium.

In 2014, the first official national tackle football team, which was called Philippine Aguilas, was organized. They made their first official international debut at the 2015 IFAF World Championship Asian qualifier game against Japan on April 26, 2014. The Philippines was defeated by Japan on their first game with the score 0-86.

The Philippines hosted their first ever international friendly at home against the Western Australian Raiders of the Australian Gridiron League. The national team lost the match held at the Emperador Stadium by 7–56. In 2015, the team organized a friendly match against the Korea Tigers, a team bannered by the Korea University. The Aguilas lost to the Tigers, with the close scoreline of 33–38.

=== Aguila All-Star era ===
The national team is funded by its players, not by the government. It occasionally receives funds from sponsors. In 2016, a non-profit Player's Association was formed by players, which are part of teams that were part of ArenaBall Philippines such as the Bandits, Knights, Renegades, Wolves, and the Vanguards, as well as from other leagues such as the Templars and the Neros which were newly formed by the time of the association's establishment. This association uses its funds for international games, a free league and for charity events. The core of the national team is composed of players from this association and has adopted the moniker "All-Star Aguilas". This team is also known as the "Aguila All-Stars".

All-Star Aguilas won their first match against an international opposition when they won over the Korean Tigers at their second meeting at the PHIL-KOR Cup in February 2016.

Tackle football activity in general in the Philippines was distrupted by the COVID-19 pandemic which started in 2020.

== Fixtures and results ==
| Date | Location | Home | Score | Away | Tournament | Result | Ref. |
|---|---|---|---|---|---|---|---|
| April 26, 2014 | VITAL Field, Tokyo | Japan | 86–0 | Philippines | 2015 IFAF World Championship qualification | Lost | |
| August 16, 2014 | Emperador Stadium, Taguig | Philippines | 7–56 | (Australia) W.A. Raiders | Friendly | Lost | |
| March 1, 2015 | Emperador Stadium, Taguig | Philippines | 33–38 | (South Korea) Korea Tigers | Friendly (2015 PHIL-KOR Cup) | Lost | |
| March 1, 2016 | Chelsea FC Blue Pitch Circuit, Makati | Philippines | 19–8 | (South Korea) Korea Tigers | Friendly (2016 PHIL-KOR Cup) | Won | |

== IFAF World Championship record ==
| Year | Position | GP | W | L | PF | PA |
|---|---|---|---|---|---|---|
| (Italy) 1999 | Did not enter, not yet an IFAF member | | | | | |
| (Germany) 2003 | Did not enter, not yet an IFAF member | | | | | |
| (Japan) 2007 | Did not enter, not yet an IFAF member | | | | | |
| (Austria) 2011 | Did not enter, not yet an IFAF member | | | | | |
| (United States) 2015 | Did not qualify | | | | | |

== Coaches ==
| Nat. | Head coach | Term | Tournament |
|---|---|---|---|
| (Philippines) | William Yeh | 2014 | 2015 IFAF World Championship qualification |
| (Croatia) | Ivan Klaric | 2014 | N/A (Friendly against Western Australia Raiders) |
| (United States) | John Walker | 2015 | 2015 PHL-KOR Cup |
| (Philippines) | Edlen Hernandez | 2016 | 2016 PHIL-KOR Cup |
