= Teresa Manera =

Argentine paleontologist

- Education: Universidad Nacional del Sur
- Scientific career
- Fields: Paleontology, geology
- Workplaces: Universidad Nacional del Sur
- Thesis: Estudio tafonómico y bioestratigráfico de los vertebrados de la Formación Monte Hermoso (Plioceno) en su localidad tipo, provincia de Buenos Aires.
- Doctoral advisor: Ester Farinati
- Author abbrev. (zoology): Bianco

Teresa Manera de Bianco is an Argentine paleontologist and geologist. She was a professor in the geology department of the Universidad Nacional del Sur. She conducts research on vertebrate paleontology and topics related to vertebrate footprints and remains from the Quaternary period. In 1986, she discovered a stretch of land near Pehuen Co containing 12,000-year-old fossilized footprints of at least 22 distinct species, including those of the extinct sloth Megatherium and Glyptodonts.

== Early life and education ==
Teresa Manera was born into a Bahian family of Italian immigrants. She studied at the Universidad Nacional del Sur, earning a degree in geological sciences in 1968 and a PhD in geology in 1972.

== Career and research ==
Manera spent much of her career as a professor of paleontology in the Department of Geology of the Universidad Nacional del Sur in Bahía Blanca. She worked at the university from 1968 to 2015, starting out as a teaching assistant. Manera conducts research on vertebrate paleontology and topics related to vertebrate footprints and remains from the Quaternary period.

Manera settled in Punta Alta, where she began collecting fossils for a museum. Following a storm in October 1986, she and her family discovered a three-kilometre stretch of land east of Pehuen Co with a sedimentary rock platform near the beach containing 12,000-year-old fossilized footprints of at least 22 distinct species, including large mammals such as the extinct sloth Megatherium as well as Macrauchenia, mastodons, and bears. Footprints of Glyptodonts were discovered at the site in 2016.

Following the discovery, Manera published a paper with fellow UNS academic Silvia Ramallo. She led a project with students from the Universidad Nacional del Sur to create molds and replicas of the fossilized footprints.

A 2005 bill to make the archeological site a natural reserve was approved by the Government of Buenos Aires. Through Law Nº 13.394, the site was declared the Pehuen Co-Monte Hermoso Provincial Geological, Paleontological and Archaeological Reserve. The site was added to a tentative UNESCO list of World Heritage Sites in 2012.

Manera discovered the holotype of the extinct turtle species Yaminuechelys gasparinii in the La Colonia Formation in 2001. In 2014, Manera was part of a team that described the Early Pliocene fossil fish genus Plesiopercichthys after discovering its type species, Plesiopercichthys dimartinoi, in the Monte Hermoso Formation.

Manera is the author of numerous research papers, book chapters and books. She authored the 2008 book Yacimiento Paleoicnológico de Pehuen-Có. Un patrimonio natural en peligro. Her books Las huellas de los gigantes and La herencia de Darwin a la paleantología regional were published by EdiUNS.

== Awards and honors ==
Manera has been the honorary scientific director of the Carlos Darwin Museum of Natural Sciences in Punta Alta since 1990. She won a Rolex Award for Enterprise in 2004 and was declared an illustrious citizen of Rosaleña in 2014.

== Selected publications ==
- Manera de Bianco, Teresa; Aramayo, Silvia A.; Zavala, Carlos; Caputo, Ricardo O. (2008). "Yacimiento Paleoicnológico de Pehuen-Có. Un patrimonio natural en peligro". Sitios de Interés Geológico de la República Argentin (in Spanish): 509–520. Archived from the original on 3 April 2025.
- Manera de Bianco, T., Aramayo, S. A. y Ortiz, H. O. (2005). "Trazas de pelaje en icnitas de megaterios en el Yacimiento Paleoicnológico de Pehuen Có (Pleistoceno Tardío), provincia de Buenos Aires, Argentina". 21º Jornadas Argentinas de Paleontología de Vertebrados.
- Agnolin, Federico L.; Bogan, Sergio; Tomassini, Rodrigo L.; Manera, Teresa (2014). "Nuevo Percichthyidae (Teleostei, Percoidei) del Plioceno temprano de la provincia de Buenos Aires (Argentina) y sus implicancias biogeográficas". Revista del Museo Argentino de Ciencias Naturales. 16 (1): 19–31. ISSN 1853-0400.
- Aramayo, Silvia A.; Manera de Bianco, Teresa; Bastianelli, Nerea V.; Melchor, Ricardo N. (December 2015). "Pehuen Co: Updated taxonomic review of a late Pleistocene ichnological site in Argentina". Palaeogeography, Palaeoclimatology, Palaeoecology. 439: 144–165. Bibcode:2015PPP...439..144A. doi:10.1016/j.palaeo.2015.07.006. hdl:11336/125572.
