= Japan women's national flag football team =

Japan
Logo

National team information
- Federation: Japan American Football Association
- IFAF continental area: Asia

Personnel
- Head coach: Nobuhara Norikazu

Nickname
- Flag Football Japan (フラッグフットボールJAPAN)

Championships
- Asia-Oceania Championships: 0 (no overall): Asia tournament: 2025

The Japan women's national flag football team represents Japan in women's international flag football matches. The sport is governed by Japan American Football Association. In 2024, the International Federation of American Football (IFAF) ranked the team 3rd worldwide. In 2025 they fell to 5th.

Koji Kuwahara coached the team for the 2023 IFAF Women's Asia Oceania Flag Football Championship. In 2024 the head coach was Ayumu Iwai. Takuro Ikawa followed in 2025. Nobuhara Norikazu was appointed head coach in October 2025.

== History ==
Japan has played in the IFAF Flag Football World Championship. It debuted in 2004, in the second edition in France where the Tokyo Metropolitan University of Health Sciences played as the Japan national flag football team finishing third. The FFFC Fujitsu Marontiers, playing as Japan, ended as silver medalist losing 32-46 to France in the final of the 2006 edition.

Fujitsu continued playing as the national team in the World Championship until the 2016 edition. Since the 2018 edition, Japan has selected players from different teams to form its national team.

At the 2022 World Games the team reached the playoff round and lost to Austria.

The Japan women's team won the inaugural IFAF Asia-Oceania Flag Football Championship in 2023 by defeating Australia. The final score was 47-29. The team was undefeated the entire championship.

They won a bronze at the 2024 World Championships defeating Great Britain in their last match.
