= Denmark women's national flag football team =

Denmark

National team information
- Federation: Danish American Football Federation
- IFAF continental area: Europe

Championships
- European championships: 1: 2017

The Denmark women's national flag football team represents Denmark in women's international flag football matches. The sport is governed by the Danish American Football Federation. In 2023, the International Federation of American Football (IFAF) ranked the Denmark women's team 19th worldwide, tied with Finland. In 2025 they ranked 20th.

Brøndby Stadium is their home stadium. In 2024 Nadia Panzio was chosen as President of the organization.

In 2017, they took gold at the IFAF European Flag Football Championship, defeating Israel. In 2019 they placed 4th, losing to Austria 34–19. In the 2021 IFAF Women's Flag Football World Championship, they defeated Switzerland but then lost to Team Neutral, placing 14th. At the 2023 IFAF European Flag Football Championship in Limerick, Ireland the team placed 1–2 in their bracket. They lost to Sweden and Czechia and defeated Ukraine.

== Players ==
=== Current squad ===
(player and team as of June 2024)

- Christina Mørup, KFB Foxes
- Clara Stroustrup Hansen, Copenhagen Raptors
- Freja Overby, Aarhus Tigers
- Kamille Lisborg Sommer, Copenhagen Raptors
- Laura Poyner, Triangle Razorbacks
- Louise Pii Frederiksen, Sydhavn Sharks
- Luna Schytz Wolf, Triangle Razorbacks
- Maja Lisborg Summer, Copenhagen Raptors
- Malene Mølgaard Andersen, Triangle Razorbacks
- Maria Kristiansen, Aarhus Tigers
- Sabrina Sperling, Benmestoura
- Sidsel Andersen
