= Paul Manera =

Paul Manera (born 15 February 1967) is an Australian who played American football for the University of Hawaii. Manera is now currently coaching in Sydney, Australia and running his own company, Bring It On Sports with his wife Elissa.

== Early life ==
Manera grew up playing rugby union, and as a junior, represented Parramatta Rugby Union Club. At the age of 12, Manera developed an interest in American football and started watching it on late night television. At a chance meeting, he heard that the sport was starting up in Sydney.

PauI's Gridiron career started in 1984, at the age of 17, when he began playing for the Fairfield Argonauts as a Tight End and Inside Linebacker. In 1987, Manera moved to the Bondi Raiders Gridiron Club, where he started playing on the Defensive line. During this year, Manera introduced himself to Paul Johnson (former offensive coordinator University Of Hawaii and current head coach of Georgia Tech) and expressed his desire to play college football in the US. Coach Johnson suggested that Manera enroll into a junior college.

== Playing career ==
=== Itawamba College ===
In August 1987, Manera enrolled into Itawamba Community College in Fulton, Mississippi. At the time, Manera was 6 ft 3, weighed in at 215 pounds and played as a Defensive end. He was an undersized player for this position but played with high intensity.

In January 1988, Manera was awarded a scholarship at Itawamba Community College and later that spring he was moved to offensive tackle, where he started every snap at only 235 pounds and was awarded with an Honorable Mention for All-State Mississippi Junior College.

=== University of Hawaii ===
In 1989, Manera was awarded with a full scholarship to play Gridiron at the University of Hawaii. At Hawaii, Manera played offensive tackle at 255 pounds. He was a 3-year letter-man and in his senior year he was selected as an Academic All Western Athletic Conference Player. Manera's last game for UH was against Notre Dame on 30 November 1991, narrowly losing 48-42. In May 1992, Manera graduated from the University of Hawaii with a bachelor's degree in Business Administration majoring in Finance.

== Coaching career ==
Manera’s coaching career began in 1992, where he served as a student assistant coach at the University of Hawaii. He assisted on the offensive line and worked with Mike Sewak, (current offensive line coach at Georgia Tech) and Ken Niumatalolo (current head coach at US Naval Academy).

Manera returned home to Australia in 1992 and continued to coach American football. He currently coaches at the UNSW Raiders Gridiron Youth Academy. He also worked as a part-time lecturer at the Australian College of Physical Education teaching the basics of the sport to undergraduate physical education teachers.

=== AGCA (Australian Gridiron Coaches Association) ===
Manera established the Australian Gridiron Coaches Association (AGCA) in 1994 where he served as the president until 2007.

In 2000, as the president of the Australian Gridiron Coaches Association, Manera was instrumental in setting up the Coaching Accreditation Program for Gridiron Coaches in Australia. In 2003 this program was formally recognized by the Australian Sports Commission and accepted into their National Coaching Accreditation Scheme. Manera conducted coaching accreditation courses in major cities across Australia and in Auckland, New Zealand.

=== Australian Cyclones (1999) ===
Manera was the offensive line coach for the Australian Cyclones National Gridiron Team which competed at the 1st ever World Cup of American football in Palermo, Sicily.

In the same year, he coached professionally as the offensive line coach for the Recruit Seagulls (Obic Seagulls) who play in the X-League in Tokyo, Japan.

=== NSW (New South Wales) Wolfpack & Australian Outback Gridiron National Team ===
During 2000, Manera returned to Australia to become the head coach of the NSW Wolfpack State Team, While he was head coach, the Wolfpack were runners-up at the Gridiron Australia National Championships in 2001, and won the championship in 2003, 2005, 2006.

He then became the head coach of the Australian Outback National Gridiron Team which beat New Zealand in 2001. In 2003, Manera was also inducted into the Gridiron NSW Hall of fame for his achievements as a coach. In 2005, Manera was selected once again as the head coach of the Australian National Team that competed in the world games against Germany and France. In 2007, he was the head coach of the Australian National Team which played against South Korea in a World Cup Qualification game.

Manera has previously coached for the Bondi Raiders as well as serving as the offensive coordinator for the Australian Outback Gridiron National Team which competed in Sweden in 2015 at the World Cup of American football.

=== IFAF (International Federation for American football) ===
In 2006, Manera was selected to be on the technical committee for the International Federation for American football (IFAF) where he served until 2012 providing advice and assistance in developmental programs for coaches and players.

In 2011, he was selected to be the offensive coordinator of the IFAF world Under 19 World Championship team which narrowly lost to the US in the International Bowl 21-14.

In 2012, he was the offensive line coach on the World Under 19’s Team which beat the US 35–29 in a historical victory.

=== Southern Cross All-Stars ===
In 2012, Manera established the Southern Cross All-Stars which played against a HGL team in Oahu, Hawaii.

=== Future Stars (Australian Junior Development Program) ===
In 2013, Manera was consulted by the Australian Future Stars program to organize a high level developmental camp to compete in the Down Under Bowl, which is a tournament played every year on the Gold Coast in Australia between visiting US high school all-star teams. The Australian Future Stars won their 1st ever game beating the USA Cougars 40–36.

Coaching Continued

In 2015, Manera was the Offensive Coordinator for the Australian Outback Mens National Gridiron Team which competed at the IFAF World Championships at Canton Ohio which finished in 5th place with a 3-1 record, with victories over South Korea and Brazil.

In 2019 Manera was selected to coach Offensive Line in the 2020 Hula Bowl Hawaii https://www.hulabowl.com/about/staff and served under legendary NFL Head Coach Mike Smith and Offensive Coordinator Ron Turner.

In 2020 Manera was selected to be the Head Coach of the NSW Wolf-pack but the competition was cancelled due to Covid-19. Manera did not coach in 2021 due to the season being cancelled due to COVID 19 restrictions.

In 2022 Manera became the Offensive Coordinator for the Northern Sydney Rebels Gridiron Club and earned Coach of the Year for Gridiron NSW.

In 2023 Paul was inducted into the NSW Far West Sporting Hall of Fame https://lovethefarwest.com.au/far-west-nsw-sporting-hall-of-fame/paul-manera/ for his achievements as a player and a coach.

In 2023 Manera was selected as the Head Coach of the First ever Australian Womens National Flag Football team which finished in 2nd place ( silver medalists) at the IFAF Asia /Oceania Championships https://barriertruth.com.au/paul-manera-flag-football-coach/

== Bring It On Sports ==
During 2007, Manera and his wife, Elissa, established Bring it on Sports, a sports marketing & recreation company that specializes in sports programs for kids, US scholarships services, and sports related travel.

Manera now helps the game of American football in Australia by teaching flag football in schools. He also helps Aussies get scholarships to the US. Manera also brings out US American football coaches to teach at camps and clinics in Australia.

In 2012 Manera was the head coach of The Southern Cross All-Stars which played in Oahu, Hawaii in 2012 vs a Hawaii Gridiron League team.
