= American Football Federation of the Philippines =

Organization in Philippines

- Formation: October 2011; 15 years ago
- Purpose: Promotion of tackle football in the Philippines

The American Football Federation of the Philippines (AFFP) is a non-profit organization in the Philippines founded in October 2011. The organization aspired to be the national sports association for American football in the Philippines. It organized the Philippine Punishers and the Philippine Lady Punishers which are men's and women's team respectively which consisted of a mix of Filipino and foreign players.

== History ==
The American Football Federation of the Philippines (AFFP) was established in October 2011. The AFFP began recruiting players to form a men's team called the Philippine Punishers and was head coached by Tim Beasley, an American expatriate who has been in the Philippines since 2006. The team is a mix of Filipinos and foreign nationals.

The team was a full 11-a-side team and was sometimes considered as the de facto Philippine national team. They also organized the D-League which served as the source for players for the Punishers.

The AFFP aspired to be recognized as the national sports association for American football in the Philippines.

The AFFP later formed the women's counterpart of the Punishers, the Philippine Lady Valkyries. They later changed their name to the Philippine Lady Punishers in late 2014.

== Teams ==
- Philippine Punishers – men's team
- Philippine Lady Punishers – women's team

== Coaches ==
- (United States) Tim Beasley (Punishers; 2011–2013)

== Results ==
=== Punishers ===
Date	Location	Home	Score	Away	Result	Ref.
April 28, 2012	Clark	Punishers	12–32	Guam All-Stars	Lost	
May 2012	Clark	Punishers	42–14	Cobras	Won	
July 2012	Beijing	Beijing Guardians	0–14	Punishers	Won	
August 2012	Hong Kong	Cobras	12–32	Punishers	Won	
2013	ASCOM Field, Taguig	Punishers	0–44	Guam All-Stars	Lost	
April 28, 2012	Clark	Punishers	12–32	Guam All-Stars	Lost	
February 1, 2014	Quezon City	Punishers	0–0	Gridiron Divas (women)	Draw	

=== Lady Punishers ===
Date	Location	Home	Score	Away	Result	Ref.
February 2, 2014	Quezon City	Lady Valkyries	7–23	Gridiron Divas	Lost	
