= Spain women's national flag football team =

Spain

National team information
- Federation: Spanish Federation of American Football
- IFAF continental area: Europe

Championships
- European championships: 1: 2019

The Spain women's national flag football team represents Spain in women's international flag football matches. The sport is governed by the Spanish Federation of American Football (FEFA). In 2024, the International Federation of American Football (IFAF) ranked the team 7th worldwide. They retained the rank in 2025.

Spain formed a national women's team in 2014 and Daniel Castañón was chosen as head coach in the same year.

== Championships ==
IFAF Europe organizes flag football continental championships every two years to fall in between the world championships. The women's team won medals in 2019 and 2023. In 2019, they defeated Great Britain, 28-14, to take gold. In 2023, they lost to Great Britain in the final by a score of 26-19. The final winning points for Great Britain came in the last 14 seconds.
