= Great Britain women's national flag football team =

Great Britain

National team information
- Federation: British American Football Association
- IFAF continental area: Europe

Championships
- European championships: 2: 2023, 2025

The Great Britain women's national flag football team represents Great Britain in women's international flag football matches. The sport is governed by the British American Football Association. In 2024, the International Federation of American Football (IFAF) ranked the team 5th worldwide. They rose to 3rd in 2025.

Dean Whittingslow began as head coach in March 2019 and later left the position in November 2024. Jack Reed, previously an offensive coordinator, then assumed the role.

== Championships ==
The team's first appearance at the IFAF Flag Football World Championship was in 2024 when they won seventh place at the Championship in which they secured a spot for the 2025 World Games.

IFAF Europe organizes flag football continental championships every two years to fall in between the world championships. The women's team received medals in 2017, 2019, 2023 and 2025. In 2017 they placed third. At the 2019 championship in Jerusalem, they were defeated by Spain with the score of 26-19, taking silver. The team faced Spain again at the 2023 European Championship, this time winning gold. The win came in the last 14 seconds, when quarterback Brittany Botterill threw the winning pass to Phoebe Schecter. They retained their European title in 2025, beating Austria 34-33 in overtime in the final in Paris.

== See also ==
- Great Britain women's national American football team
- Great Britain national American football team
- Great Britain men's national flag football team
