= IFAF Oceania =

Sports governing body

- Members: 5
- Continental chair: Vacant
- Website: www.americanfootball.sport

IFAF Oceania is the governing body of American football in Oceania. It is a member of the International Federation of American Football. IFAF Oceania replaced the Oceania Federation of American Football (OFAF) in 2012. They additionally oversee flag football.

== Members ==
- Australia
- New Caledonia
- New Zealand
- Papua New Guinea
- French Polynesia

== Former members ==
- American Samoa
- Guam
- Tonga

== Competitions ==
- Australia and New Zealand compete in the annual Oceania Bowl
- IFAF World Championship, every four years
- IFAF Flag Football World Championship, every two years
- IFAF Asia-Oceania Flag Football Championships, every two years
