= IFAF Asia =

- Members: 14 (October 2025)
- Director: Daryll Nathaniel
- Website: www.americanfootball.sport

IFAF Asia is the governing body of American football in Asia. It is a member of the International Federation of American Football. IFAF Asia replaced the Asian Federation of American Football (AFAF) in 2012. The oldest of IFAF Asia federations is the Japan American Football Association (JAFA), which was founded in 1934.

== Competitions ==
- IFAF World Championship, every four years
- IFAF Flag Football World Championship, every two years
- IFAF Asia-Oceania Flag Football Championships, every two years
- Asian beach Flag Football championships (Men), every two years
- Beach flag football at the 2014 Asian Beach Games

== Members ==
(as of October 2025)

- Hong Kong, founded in 2009
- India, founded in 2007
- Indonesia
- Japan, founded in 2005
- Jordan, founded in 2023
- Kazakhstan, founded in 2020
- Mongolia, founded in 2009
- South Korea, founded in 1946
- Kuwait, founded in 2011
- Malaysia, founded in 2017
- Philippines, founded in 2009
- Singapore, founded in 2007
- Thailand (Thailand American Football Association)
- Vietnam

== Inactive members ==
- Bangladesh
- Cambodia
- China
- Chinese Taipei
- Laos
- Guam
- Kyrgyzstan
- Kuwait
- Malaysia
- Maldives
- Myanmar
- Nepal
- Pakistan
- Qatar
- Saudi Arabia
- Sri Lanka
- Tajikistan
- Turkmenistan
- Uzbekistan
