= Elitserien (women's volleyball) =

Swedish women's volleyball top division

- Sport: Volleyball
- Founded: 1961
- No. of teams: 11
- Country: Sweden
- Continent: Europe
- Most recent champion: Linköpings VC (1st title)
- Most titles: Sollentuna VK (19 titles)
- Website: Elitserien (in Swedish)

Elitserien (Swedish: Elitserien i volleyboll för damer) is the Swedish women's volleyball top division. The regular season usually takes place from October to late February or early March and is followed up by play-offs to determine the Swedish national champion.

== Teams ==
The following clubs were competing in the 2024–25 season:

- Engelholms VS
- Gislaveds VBK
- Göteborg VBK
- Hylte/Halmstad
- IKSU
- Lindesbergs VBK
- Linköpings VC
- Lunds VK
- RIG Falköping
- Sollentuna VK
- Örebro VS

== Previous winners ==
- 1961–62: Bosöns IK (1)
- 1962–63: Bosöns IK (2)
- 1963–64: Bosöns IK (3)
- 1964–65: Kolbäcks VK (1)
- 1965–66: Bosöns IK (4)
- 1966–67: Bosöns IK (5)
- 1967–68: Vallentuna VBK (1)
- 1968–69: Kolbäcks VK (2)
- 1969–70: Värnamo FK (1)
- 1970–71: Alingsås VBK (1)
- 1971–72: Värnamo FK (2)
- 1972–73: Värnamo FK (3)
- 1973–74: Värnamo FK (4)
- 1974–75: Sollentuna VK (1)
- 1975–76: Sollentuna VK (2)
- 1976–77: Sollentuna VK (3)
- 1977–78: Sollentuna VK (4)
- 1978–79: Sollentuna VK (5)
- 1979–80: Sollentuna VK (6)
- 1980–81: Sollentuna VK (7)
- 1981–82: Sollentuna VK (8)
- 1982–83: Sollentuna VK (9)
- 1983–84: Sollentuna VK (10)
- 1984–85: Sollentuna VK (11)
- 1985–86: Sollentuna VK (12)
- 1986–87: Sollentuna VK (13)
- 1987–88: Sollentuna VK (14)
- 1988–89: Uppsala Studenters IF (1)
- 1989–90: Sollentuna VK (15)
- 1990–91: Sollentuna VK (16)
- 1991–92: Sollentuna VK (17)
- 1992–93: Uppsala VBS (2)
- 1993–94: Vallentuna VBK (2)
- 1994–95: Sollentuna VK (18)
- 1995–96: Örebro KFUM (1)
- 1996–97: Örebro KFUM (2)
- 1997–98: Örebro KFUM (3)
- 1998–99: Örebro KFUM (4)
- 1999–00: Örebro KFUM (5)
- 2000–01: Örebro KFUM (6)
- 2001–02: Katrineholms VK (1)
- 2002–03: Örebro VS (7)
- 2003–04: Örebro VS (8)
- 2004–05: Örebro VS (9)
- 2005–06: Engelholms VS (1)
- 2006–07: Sollentuna VK (19)
- 2007–08: Örebro VS (10)
- 2008–09: Engelholms VS (2)
- 2009–10: Katrineholms VK (2)
- 2010–11: Katrineholms VK (3)
- 2011–12: Lindesbergs VBK (1)
- 2012–13: Katrineholms VK (4)
- 2013–14: Hylte/Halmstad VBK (1)
- 2014–15: Engelholms VS (3)
- 2015–16: Engelholms VS (4)
- 2016–17: Engelholms VS (5)
- 2017–18: Engelholms VS (6)
- 2018–19: Engelholms VS (7)
- 2019–20: Cancelled due to the COVID-19 pandemic
- 2020–21: Hylte/Halmstad VBK (2)
- 2021–22: Hylte/Halmstad VBK (3)
- 2022–23: Engelholms VS (8)
- 2023–24: Örebro VS (11)
- 2024–25: Linköpings VC (1)

Source: Elitserienvolleyboll.se

== Titles by team ==
Club	Wins	First Title	Last Title
Sollentuna VK	19	1975	2007
Örebro KFUM/VS	11	1996	2024
Engelholms VS	8	2006	2023
Bosöns IK	5	1962	1967
Katrineholms VK	4	2002	2013
Värnamo FK	4	1970	1974
Hylte/Halmstad VBK	3	2014	2022
Kolbäcks VK	2	1965	1969
Uppsala VBS/Stud	2	1989	1993
Vallentuna VBK	2	1968	1994
Alingsås VK	1	1971	1971
Lindesbergs VBK	1	2012	2012
Linköpings VC	1	2025	2025
