= 2026–27 Men's Super League =

English volleyball season

2026-27 Men's Super League
- Association: Volleyball England
- League: English National Volleyball League
- Sport: Men's volleyball
- Duration: 31 October 2026 – 11 April 2027
- Games: 60
- Teams: 8

Regular season
- Top seed: Malory Eagles UEL
- Top scorer: (Ukraine) Daniil Pyvovarenko (London Giants) – 45pts.

Final

English Volleyball League seasons
- ← 2025-26 2027-28 →

The DYNAMIK Men's Super League is the 47th season of the highest tier of domestic division in English Men's Volleyball League under the organistaion of Volleyball England. The season started with an Opening Weekend event on the 31st October 2026 held at Loughborough University.

Newcastle Staffs and Team Essex Blaze were promoted to the Super League for the 26–27 season having won the previous editions of the NVL Division 1 North and South respectively.

== Format ==
Eight clubs participated in the 2026-27 league, which is split into two phases.

=== Regular season ===
The first phase, known as the regular season, runs from October 2026 to March 2027 and consist of a double round robin system with each team playing each other home-and-away. The bottom ranked team is automatically relegated to NVL Division 1 for the next season.

==== Pool standing composition ====
1. Teams will be ranked by the highest number of match points gained as follows:
  - Match won 3–0 or 3–1: 3 points for the winner, 0 points for the loser
  - Match won 3–2: 2 points for the winner, 1 point for the loser
  - Match forfeited: 3 points for the winner, 0 points (0–25, 0–25, 0–25) for the loser
2. In the event of the tie, the following tiebreakers will apply in order:
  - Set Quotient: Division of the number of sets won by the number of sets lost
  - Points Quotient: Division of the number of points won by the number of points lost
  - Head-to-head record

=== Playoffs ===
==== Relegation playoffs ====
At the end of the regular season, the seventh ranked team plays a single match against the losing team of the NVL Division 1 promotion playoffs. The venue is chosen by Volleyball England and the winner plays in the Super League for the next season.

==== Final 4 ====
At the end of the regular season, the top four teams directly advance to the semifinals in the "Final 4" play-offs with the classic pairing system (1st vs 4th, 2nd vs 3rd). Semifinals, 3rd place match and final will play as a single match on 10 and 11 April 2027 at a venue chosen by Volleyball England.

== Teams ==
2026-27 Super League Teams
| Team | | Map |
|---|---|---|
| ERM | Essex Rebels | Locations of the 2026-27 Super League teams Greater London Super League volleyball clubs |
| LGM | London Giants | Locations of the 2026-27 Super League teams Greater London Super League volleyball clubs |
| MEM | Malory Eagles UEL | Locations of the 2026-27 Super League teams Greater London Super League volleyball clubs |
| NKM | Newcastle Knights | Locations of the 2026-27 Super League teams Greater London Super League volleyball clubs |
| RID | Richmond Docklands | Locations of the 2026-27 Super League teams Greater London Super League volleyball clubs |
| UNM | University of Nottingham | Locations of the 2026-27 Super League teams Greater London Super League volleyball clubs |
| Promotion from NVL Division 1 | | Locations of the 2026-27 Super League teams Greater London Super League volleyball clubs |
| EXB | Essex Blaze | Locations of the 2026-27 Super League teams Greater London Super League volleyball clubs |
| NS1 | Newcastle Staffs Mens 1 | Locations of the 2026-27 Super League teams Greater London Super League volleyball clubs |

Note: Table lists in alphabetical order.

== Regular season ==
=== League table ===
| Pos | Team | Pld | W | L | Pts | SW | SL | SR | SPW | SPL | SPR | Qualification or relegation |
|---|---|---|---|---|---|---|---|---|---|---|---|---|
| 1 | Malory Eagles UEL | 4 | 4 | 0 | 12 | 12 | 0 | MAX | 302 | 229 | 1.319 | Final 4 Semifinals |
| 2 | Newcastle Knights | 3 | 3 | 0 | 8 | 9 | 2 | 4.500 | 263 | 230 | 1.143 | Final 4 Semifinals |
| 3 | Essex Rebels | 5 | 3 | 2 | 8 | 10 | 8 | 1.250 | 407 | 390 | 1.044 | Final 4 Semifinals |
| 4 | London Giants | 3 | 2 | 1 | 7 | 8 | 4 | 2.000 | 265 | 261 | 1.015 | Final 4 Semifinals |
| 5 | University of Nottingham | 4 | 2 | 2 | 6 | 6 | 6 | 1.000 | 268 | 229 | 1.170 | |
| 6 | Richmond Docklands | 3 | 1 | 2 | 3 | 3 | 6 | 0.500 | 201 | 210 | 0.957 | |
| 7 | Essex Blaze | 4 | 1 | 3 | 3 | 3 | 9 | 0.333 | 259 | 282 | 0.918 | Relegation play-offs |
| 8 | Newcastle Staffs Mens 1 | 6 | 0 | 6 | 1 | 2 | 18 | 0.111 | 351 | 485 | 0.724 | Relegated to NVL Division 1 |

Updated to match(es) played on 22 November 2026. Source: Super League Results and Table

=== Results table ===
| Home \ Away | ERM | EXB | LGM | MEM | NKM | NS1 | RID | UNM |
|---|---|---|---|---|---|---|---|---|
| Essex Rebels | | | 1–3 | | | 3–0 | | 3–0 |
| Essex Blaze | | | | | | 3–0 | 3–0 | |
| London Giants | | 3–0 | | | | 3–0 | | |
| Malory Eagles UEL | | | | | | | 3–0 | |
| Newcastle Knights | 3–0 | 3–0 | | | | | | |
| Newcastle Staffs Mens 1 | 2–3 | | | | | | | 0–3 |
| Richmond Docklands | | | 0–3 | | | | | |
| University of Nottingham | | | | 0–3 | | 3–0 | | |

Updated to match(es) played on 22 November 2026. Source: Super League Results and Table
Legend: Blue = home team win; Red = away team win.
