= Lighthouse Theatre =

Lighthouse Theatre may refer to:

- Lighthouse (arts centre, Poole)
- Lighthouse Theatre (Kettering)
- Lighthouse Theatre (Warrnambool), Victoria, Australia

== See also ==
- Light House Media Centre, Wolverhampton
