= Team Essex Volleyball Club =

English volleyball club

Team Essex VC
- Full name: Team Essex Volleyball Club
- Short name: TEVC
- Nickname: Team Essex
- Founded: 2013
- Ground: University of Essex, St John Payne Catholic School
- Chairman: James Bernardi
- Captain: James Bernardi (Blaze)
- League: Volleyball England

Uniforms
Home	Away

Team Essex Volleyball Club is a volleyball team based in Chelmsford, Great Britain since 2013. The club consists of a men's teams and a women's team that play in Volleyball England's English National Volleyball League. The Men's 1st team play in Volleyball England's Super League. The Women's 1st team play in Division 1. Subsequently, TEVC have a Men's and Women's team that also play in Division 3.

== Achievements ==
Team Essex Trinity (Women)

- Winners of Division 2 and promotion to division 1 2023/2024.
- English Shield Runners Up 2016
- Promotion to National League Division 1

Team Essex Blaze (Men)

- Winners of Division 1 (with 4 games in hand) and promotion to Super League 2023/2024.
- English National League Division 1 Champions, 2017
- English Shield Runners Up 2015
- English National League Division 2 (South) Champions, 2013

== History ==
The club was set up in 2013 by James Bernardi, Paul French and Steven Rosser. The men and women's teams are conglomerates, the men formed through the partnership of Brentwood VC, Chelmsford VC and Boswells, the women formed as a result of a partnership with Brentwood VC, Chelmsford VC and Southend VC. The mergers gave the best volleyballers in Essex the chance to compete together at a higher level. The club has grown from strength to strength in a very short period of time, and now boasts a men's team in the top league in the country, The Super League and in Division 1. The women's team represents Team Essex in Division 2 of the National Volleyball League.

== 2023–2024 season ==
Blaze

The 2023-2024 season saw the Men's 1st team finish top in the Men's Division 1 with four games in hand. This strong finish was good enough to secure their spot in the Super League, the highest level of English Volleyball, consisting of the strongest 10 teams in the country. The result was an all round success for the newly promoted Blaze team who satisfied their goal of promotion to regain their Super League status.

Trinity

The 2023–2024 season saw the Women's 1st team finish 1st in Volleyball England's Division 2. As a result, Trinity has secured their spot in the Women's division 1 for the forthcoming season.

== Notable former players ==
Player	Current Club	Other Clubs
(United Kingdom) Andrew Saward	(England) London Aces	(England) Newcastle Staffs
(United Kingdom) Nathan French		(England) Team Northumbria (Spain) Tenerife (France) Avignon
(United Kingdom) Peter Bakare	Team Northumbria	(Belgium) Landstede Zwolle
(United Kingdom) Matthew Mills	Retired	(England) Sheffield Hallam
(United States) Gary House	Karlalið HK	
(United Kingdom) Luke French	Retired	(England) Medway
(United Kingdom) Jack Watson	(England) Ipswich Spikers	(England) Ipswich Spikers
(United Kingdom) Sam Thompson	(England) Sheffield Hallam	
(United Kingdom) Lawrence Russell	(England) Sheffield Hallam	
(United Kingdom) Matthew Ketley	(England) Sheffield Hallam	
(United Kingdom) Jake Leeks	Retired	
(United Kingdom) Robert Poole	(Germany) VC Bitterfeld-Wolfen	(United States) Mount Olive College (England) IBB Polonia London
(United Kingdom) Ryan Poole	(United States) California State University, Long Beach	(England) London Malory
(United Kingdom) Joe Houlihan	Retired	
(United Kingdom) Chris Frost	Retired	(France) Nice (France) Lille (England) London Malory
(United Kingdom) Thomas Storkey	Retired	
(United Kingdom) Jack Saward	Retired	
(United Kingdom) Adam Mitchell	(England) Stockport	
(United Kingdom) Nick Davies	(England) Plymouth	(England) London Malory (England) London Lynx (England) Tendring
(United States) Shaun Ermi	(United States) Springfield College	
(United Kingdom) Tobias French	(England) IBB Polonia London	(England) London Malory
