= Kieran Sowden =

English volleyball player (born 1990)

Personal information
- Nationality: English
- Born: 17 August 1990 (age 36)
- Height: 181 cm (5 ft 11 in)
- Weight: 78 kg (172 lb)
- Spike: 320 cm (126 in)
- Block: 310 cm (122 in)

Volleyball information
- Position: Setter
- Current club: (England) Team Northumbria
- Number: 10

Career
Years	Teams
–2014; 2014–2017; 2017–	(England) Team Northumbria (England) Polonia London (England) Team Northumbria

Kieran Sowden (born 17 August 1990) is an English volleyball player, a member of the club Team Northumbria.

== Sporting achievements ==
=== Clubs ===
English Cup:

- 2014, 2016, 2017, 2018

English Championship:

- 2016, 2017, 2018
- 2014
