= Avery Aylsworth =

American volleyball player (born 1996)

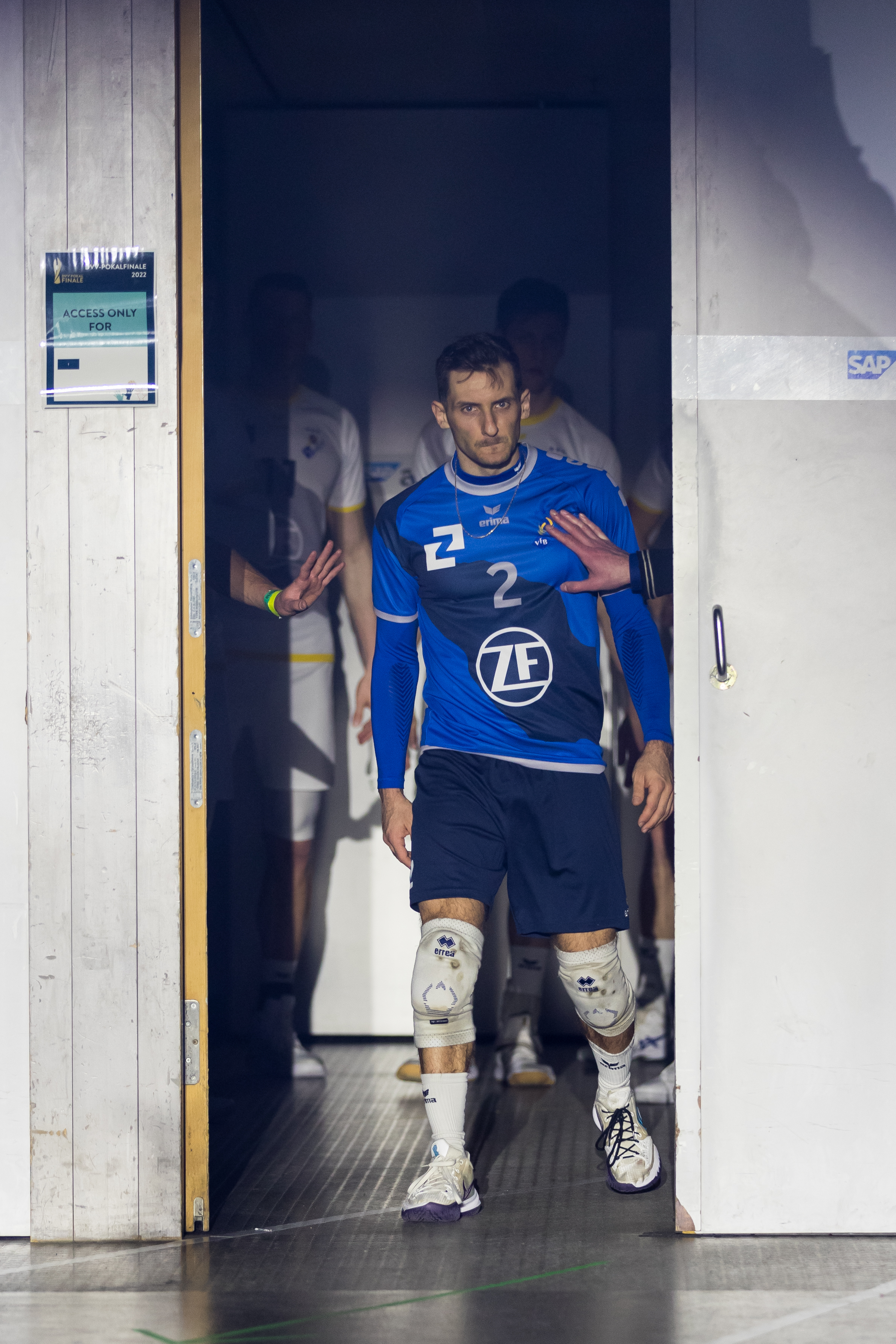

Personal information
- Nickname: Flavor
- Born: October 18, 1996 (age 30); San Jose, California, U.S.
- Height: 5 ft 11 in (1.80 m)
- Weight: 165 lb (75 kg)
- Spike: 124 in (315 cm)
- Block: 120 in (310 cm)
- Education: Loyola University Chicago; Durham University Business School

Volleyball information
- Position: Libero
- Current club: (Germany) VfB Friedrichshafen
- Number: 2

Career
Years	Teams
2016–2019; 2019–2020; 2020–2022; 2022-2023	(United States) Loyola Ramblers (Finland) Raision Loimu (Germany) VfB Friedrichshafen (England) Durham Palatinates

National team
2019	United States
Medal record
Men's volleyball
Representing United States
NVL Championship 2022/23
Gold medal – first place	Durham Palatinates
German Championship 2021/22
Silver medal – second place	VfB Friedrichshafen
German Cup 2021/22
Gold medal – first place	VfB Friedrichshafen
German Championship 2020/21
Silver medal – second place	VfB Friedrichshafen
German Cup 2020/21
Bronze medal – third place	VfB Friedrichshafen
MIVA Conference Tournament 2019
Silver medal – second place	Loyola Ramblers
MIVA Conference Tournament 2018
Silver medal – second place	Loyola Ramblers

Avery Aylsworth (born October 18, 1996) is a former professional volleyball player. He has played four seasons abroad in Europe, winning one league title in the English National Volleyball League, one cup title in the German Volleyball Cup, and two Vice-championships in the Deutsche Volleyball-Bundesliga. Currently, Aylsworth is a financial professional based in London and the author of published academic research.

Aylsworth played the position of Libero and his first professional season in Finland with Raision Loimu in the top division of the Finnish Mestaruusliiga. Next, he played the 2020/21 season with VfB Friedrichshafen in the top division of the Deutsche Volleyball-Bundesliga. During the 2020/21 season, he received a silver medal with VfB Friedrichshafen during the German Championship Playoffs. Aylsworth re-signed with VfB Friedrichshafen for the 2021/22 season. During the 2021/22 season, Aylsworth started multiple matches including the German Cup Final against SVG Luneburg where he played against fellow junior teammates, Joseph Worsley and Jordan Ewert. Aylsworth and VfB Friedrichshafen won the DVV German Cup along with earning a Silver medal following a five match battle between VfB Friedrichshafen and Berlin Recycling Volleys in the German Bundesliga Championship Finals. In 2022, Aylsworth competed in the English National Volleyball League and BUCS for Durham University where he won the NVL title and BUCS Championship for the university.

== Post-professional playing career ==
Aylsworth is currently a finance professional in London, working for BlackRock. Before joining BlackRock, Aylsworth attended Durham University Business School, where he earned an MSc in finance (finance and investment) and was awarded the Best Dissertation and Academic Performance within the program. Following his time at Durham, his research dissertation, "Machine Learning Methodologies for the Systematic Prediction of S&P 500 Index Deletions" was awarded the Lombard Prize from the Worshipful Company of International Bankers (WCIB). His study develops and tests a machine learning framework to predict discretionary deletions from the S&P 500 before official rebalance announcements, using market, volatility, trading, and financial-statement features to assess whether such removals can be identified in advance. In November 2025, his research was published in the Journal of Beta Investment Strategies, in the winter 2025 publication of the journal.

== Media appearances ==
Aylsworth has appeared on the Deep Corner podcast hosted by Rob St. Claire for Volleyball League of America (VLA) to speak about his time at Loyola, getting a contract as an American Libero, and his time with VfB Friedrichshafen. Aylsworth also appeared on the If You Can't Handle the Heat podcast to speak about his junior, collegiate, professional, and post-professional career with fellow junior teammates Gage Worsely, Micah Maʻa, and Joseph Worsley.

== Professional playing career ==
Aylsworth signed his first professional contract with Raision Loimu in Finland for the 2019/20 season. During the season, Aylsworth won 3 match MVP's and was a 14x ProLibero award winner. Between professional seasons, Aylsworth competed in the AVP Grass Nationals in South Carolina finishing 3rd after losing to Taylor Crabb, Andy Benesh, and Eric Beranek.

Soon after, Aylsworth signed with VfB Friedrichshafen for the 2020/21 season where he played with libero Markus Steuerwald, setters Dejan Vincic and Joseph Worsley, outside hitters Nicolas Marechal, Rares Balean, Benjamin Bonin, and Martti Juhkami, opposites Linus Weber and Lukas Maase and middle blocker Arno Van De Velde, David Fiel, Markus Bohme, and Nehemiah Mote. The 2021 season ended with a silver medal in Bundesliga Championship Finals against Berlin Recycling Volleys.

Aylsworth re-signed with VfB Friedrichshafen following his first season with the team for the 2021-2022 season. Here, Aylsworth and VfB Friedrichshafen won the 2022 DVV German Cup against SVG Lunebuerg, the 17th Cup title in the club's history and Aylsworth's first professional trophy. Aylsworth started the match and finished with 60% positive reception on 15 receptions in the victory. In similar fashion as the year prior, VfB Friedrichshafen and Aylsworth earned a silver medal in the Bundesliga Championship Finals against Berlin Recycling Volleys following a five match series. Aylsworth was coached by Mark Lebedew and Radomir Vemic and shared the court in the 2022 season with fellow liberos Blair Bann and Nikola Pekovic, setters Dejan Vincic and Stefan Thiel, receivers Luciano Vincentin, Ben-Simon Bonin, Daniel Muniz de Oliveira, and Vojin Cacic, middle blockers Lucas van Berkel, Andri Aganits, and Markus Boehme, and opposites Simon Hirsch and Lukas Maase.

Aylsworth joined Durham University in 2022/23 and competed in the English National Volleyball League where he won the League title.

== College career ==
Aylsworth attended Loyola University Chicago where he played at the NCAA Division 1 level. Upon finishing his NCAA career, Aylsworth finished with 249 digs his senior season, which stands as fifth most in school history for a single season. In total, Aylsworth finished his career with 619, the sixth most in school history Aylsworth was named an AVCA All-American at the end of the 2019 season. Additionally, he made the MIVA All-Conference 2nd team. Aylsworth also competed with USA Volleyball's Collegiate National Team in 2019.

== High school career ==
Aylsworth played for Saint Francis High School and played on varsity as a Freshman during playoffs. Throughout his career, he led the Lancers to a CCS title, multiple WCAL league championships and CIF NorCal State title. While at Saint Francis, Aylsworth was named to Volleyball Magazine's 2015 Boys' Fab 50. Aylsworth was also named a high school AVCA All-American in 2015.

== Athletic awards ==
=== Junior awards (Saint Francis/Club) ===
- 2012 CCS Champion
- 2015 CCS Champion
- 2012 WCAL Champion
- 2014 WCAL Champion
- 2015 WCAL Champion
- 2014 CIF NorCal State 2nd Place
- 2015 CIF NorCal State Champion
- 2015 USAV Open Champion

=== University awards Loyola University Chicago ===
- 2018 MIVA Conference Tournament, with Loyola University Chicago
- 2019 MIVA Conference Tournament, with Loyola University Chicago
- 2023 BUCS Championship, with Durham University

=== Professional awards Raision Loimu, VfB Friedrichshafen ===
- 2020 South Carolina AVP Grass National Championship, with Gage Worsley and Evan Corey
- 2020/2021 German Championship, with VfB Friedrichshafen
- 2020/2021 German Cup, with VfB Friedrichshafen
- 2021/2022 German Cup, with VfB Friedrichshafen
- 2021/2022 German Championship, with VfB Friedrichshafen
- 2022/2023 English National Volleyball League, with Durham University

=== Personal achievements ===
- 2014 All Mercury News Second Team
- 2015 All Mercury News First Team
- 2015 AVCA High School All-American
- 2015 Volleyball Magazine Fab 50
- 2016 MIVA All-Academic Team
- 2017 MIVA All-Academic Team
- 2018 MIVA All-Academic Team
- 2019 MIVA All-Academic Team
- 2019 MIVA Conference Defensive Player of the Week, with Loyola University Chicago
- 2019 MIVA Conference Second Team, with Loyola University Chicago
- 2019 AVCA All-American, with Loyola University Chicago
- 2019/2020 14x ProLibero Winner, with Raision Loimu
