= Get Along Tour =

2013 concert tour by Guy Sebastian

- Tour by Guy Sebastian
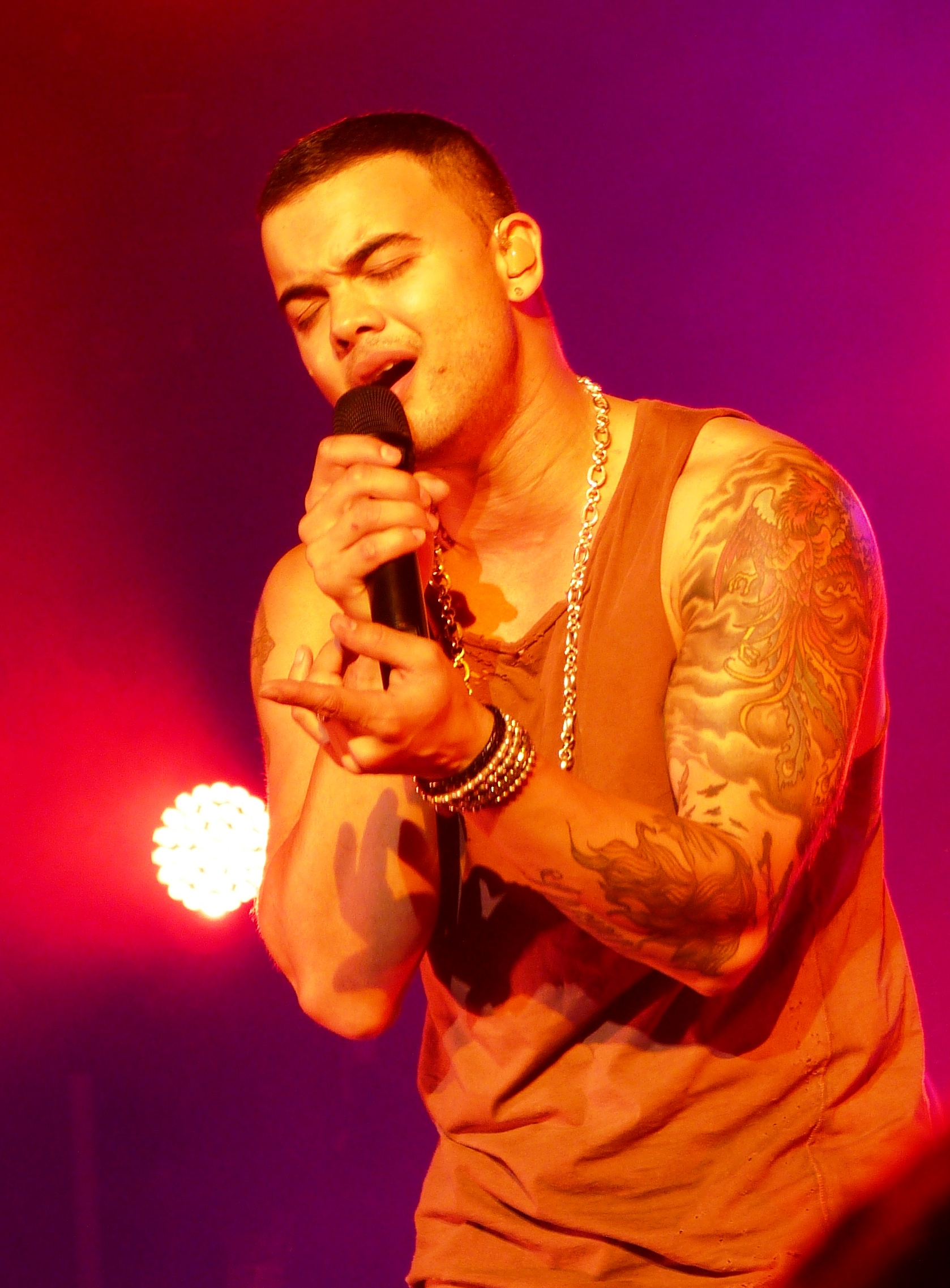
- Performing Battle Scars
- Associated album: Armageddon
- Start date: 28 March 2013
- End date: 23 June 2013
- Legs: 1
- No. of shows: 46 in Australia

Guy Sebastian concert chronology
- Armageddon tour (2012); Get Along Tour (2013); Madness Tour (2015)

Get Along Tour was the tenth concert tour by Australian recording artist Guy Sebastian. The tour supported his sixth studio album Armageddon (2013). The tour visited metro and regional areas in Australia. Sebastian won the 2013 ARIA Award for Best Live Act for the tour.

== Background ==
In November 2012 a five date tour of the mainland capital cities was announced for March/April 2013. The concerts in Melbourne, Sydney, Perth and Adelaide sold out in the first week, and an extra 5 concerts were added in those cities. The tour was extended to include 36 concerts in regional areas of Australia in May and June 2013. Overall there were 46 concert dates.

David Ryan Harris, an American soul musician who has co-written songs with Sebastian including "Like it Like That" and "Battle Scars", was the support act. He also played guitar in Sebastian's band on the tour. Carmen Smith, and former X-Factor contestant Angel Tupai were the backing vocalists, and both performed duets with Sebastian.

== Tour personnel ==
- Guy Sebastian – Vocals, Guitar, and Keys
- David Ryan Harris Support Artist – guitar and backing vocals
- Carmen Smith- Backing vocals
- Angel Tupai – Backing vocals
- Terepai Richmond – drums
- Adam Ventoura – bass
- Sam Vincent – guitar and bongo
- Wendy Anggerani – Keys
- Ludeovic Louis – trumpet and Backing vocals
- Dan Redgrave – Tourmeister
- Anatole Day – Front of House
- Justin Arthur – Monitors
- Brett Millican – Backline Stage (tour photography)

"Special Guest appearances"

- Taylor Swift
- Johnny Ruffo

== Set List ==
The following set list is representative of the show on 12 April 2013 at the Brisbane Convention Centre . It is not representative of all concerts for the duration of the tour.

1. "Amnesia"
2. "Beg"
3. "Gold"
4. "Attention"
5. "Don't Worry Be Happy / Don't You Worry Child"
6. "Keeper"
7. "Armageddon"
8. "Died and Gone to Heaven"
9. "Get Along"
10. "Art of Love"
11. "Bring Yourself"
12. "Sweetest Berry (feat. David Ryan Harris)"
13. "Big Bad World"
14. "Alive"
15. "Oh Oh"
16. "Who's That Girl"
17. "Angels Brought Me Here"
18. "Battle Scars"
19. "Bed of Clouds"
20. "Like It Like That / Thrift Shop"

== Tour dates ==
Date	City	Country	Venue
28 March 2013	Perth	Australia	Crown Theatre
30 March 2013	Perth	Australia	Crown Theatre
5 April 2013	Melbourne	Australia	Palais Theatre
6 April 2013	Melbourne	Australia	Palais Theatre
7 April 2013	Melbourne	Australia	Palais Theatre
12 April 2013	Brisbane	Australia	BCEC Great Hall
19 April 2013	Sydney	Australia	Hordern Pavilion
20 April 2013	Sydney	Australia	Hordern Pavilion
26 April 2013	Adelaide	Australia	Thebarton Theatre
27 April 2013	Adelaide	Australia	Thebarton Theatre
30 April 2013	Whyalla	Australia	Middleback Theatre
1 May 2013	Whyalla	Australia	Middleback Theatre
2 May 2013	Renmark	Australia	Chaffey Theatre
4 May 2013	Mildura	Australia	Nowingi Place Soundshell
7 May 2013	Mount Gambier	Australia	Sir Robert Helpmann Theatre
8 May 2013	Warrnambool	Australia	Lighthouse Theatre
10 May 2013	Geelong	Australia	Costa Hall
11 May 2013	Shepparton	Australia	Eastbank Centre
12 May 2013	Wangaratta	Australia	Alpine MDF Theatre
13 May 2013	Wangaratta	Australia	Alpine MDF Theatre
14 May 2013	Albury	Australia	Albury Entertainment Centre
17 May 2013	Hobart	Australia	Hobart City Hall
21 May 2013	Bendigo	Australia	Capital Theatre
22 May 2013	Bendigo	Australia	Capital Theatre
25 May 2013	Kununurra	Australia	Jim Hughes Amphitheatre
28 May 2013	Ipswich	Australia	Ipswich Civic Centre
29 May 2013	Caloundra	Australia	The Events Centre
31 May 2013	Townsville	Australia	Townsville Entertainment and Convention Centre
1 June 2013	Mackay	Australia	Bluewater Quay
2 June 2013	Rockhampton	Australia	Pilbeam Theatre
4 June 2013	Maryborough	Australia	Brolga Theatre
6 June 2013	Bundaberg	Australia	Moncrieff Entertainment Centre
7 June 2013	Toowoomba	Australia	Empire Theatre
8 June 2013	Gold Coast	Australia	Jupiters Theatre
9 June 2013	Gold Coast	Australia	Jupiters Theatre
11 June 2013	Taree	Australia	Manning Entertainment Centre
12 June 2013	Port Macquarie	Australia	Glasshouse
13 June 2013	Port Macquarie	Australia	Glasshouse
14 June 2013	Tamworth	Australia	Tamworth Regional Entertainment Centre
15 June 2013	Newcastle	Australia	Newcastle Civic Theatre
17 June 2013	Orange	Australia	Orange Civic Theatre
18 June 2013	Dubbo	Australia	Dubbo Regional Theatre
19 June 2013	Dubbo	Australia	Dubbo Regional Theatre
21 June 2013	Wollongong	Australia	WIN Entertainment Centre
22 June 2013	Canberra	Australia	Royal Theatre
23 June 2013	Wagga Wagga	Australia	Wagga Wagga Civic Theatre
