= Nicole Koolhaas =

Dutch volleyball player (born 1991)

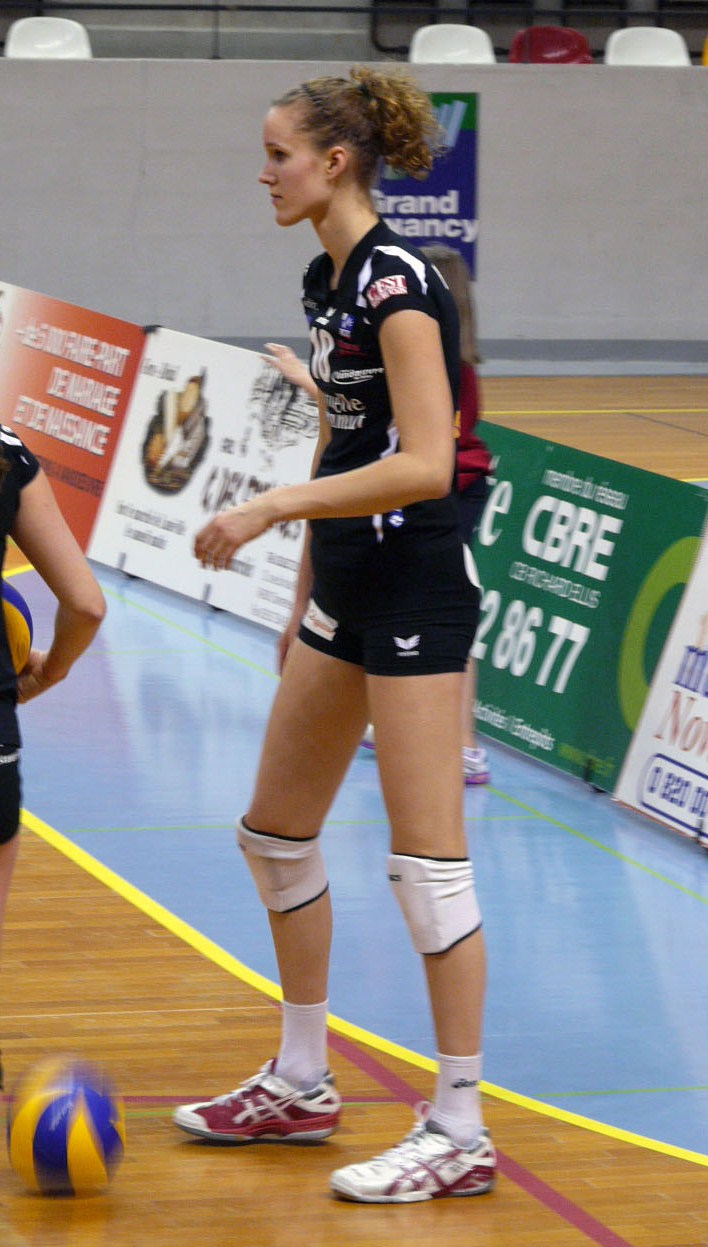

Personal information
- Nationality: Dutch
- Born: 31 January 1991 (age 35); Hoorn, Netherlands
- Height: 1.98 m (6 ft 6 in)
- Weight: 77 kg (170 lb)
- Spike: 310 cm (122 in)
- Block: 300 cm (118 in)

Volleyball information
- Position: Middle blocker
- Current club: Bartoccini Perugia Volley

Career
Years	Teams
2001–2006; 2006–2007; 2007–2010; 2010–2011; 2011–2012; 2012–2013; 2013–2014; 2014–2016; 2016–	Madjoe; VV Zaanstad; VV Alterno; Vandœuvre Nancy VB; Katrineholms VK; ASPTT Mulhouse; LP Kangasala; VFM Franches-Montagnes; CSM București

National team
Netherlands
Honours
Women's volleyball
Representing the Netherlands
World Grand Prix
Bronze medal – third place	2016 Bangkok
European Championship
Silver medal – second place	2017 Azerbaijan/Georgia

Nicole Koolhaas (born 31 January 1991) is a Dutch volleyball player, who plays as a Center. She was a member of the Women's National Team. She plays for Bartoccini Perugia Volley.

She participated in the 2010 FIVB World Grand Prix, 2010 FIVB Volleyball Women's World Championship, 2014 FIVB World Grand Prix, 2015 Montreux Volley Masters, 2015 FIVB World Grand Prix, 2016 FIVB World Grand Prix, 2017 FIVB Volleyball World Grand Prix, 2017 Montreux Volley Masters, 2017 Women's European Volleyball Championship, and 2018 FIVB Volleyball Women's Nations League.
