= Isabelle Haak =

Swedish volleyball player (born 1999)

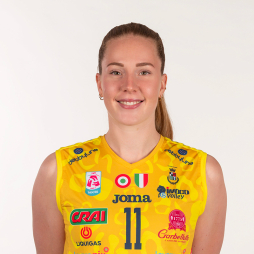
- Haak in 2025

Personal information
- Nationality: Swedish
- Born: 11 July 1999 (age 27); Perstorp, Sweden
- Hometown: Ängelholm, Sweden
- Height: 1.95 m (6 ft 5 in)
- Weight: 83 kg (183 lb)
- Spike: 330 cm (130 in)
- Block: 316 cm (124 in)

Volleyball information
- Position: Opposite
- Current club: (Italy) Imoco Volley Conegliano
- Number: 11

Career
Years	Teams
2012–2016	(Sweden) Engelholms VS
2016–2017	(France) Béziers VB
2017–2019	(Italy) Savino Del Bene Scandicci
2019–2022	(Turkey) VakıfBank S.K.
2022–	(Italy) Imoco Volley Conegliano

National team
2014–	Sweden

Isabelle Haak (born 11 July 1999) is a Swedish volleyball player who plays as an opposite for the Italian club Imoco Volley Conegliano and the Sweden national team.

== Club career ==
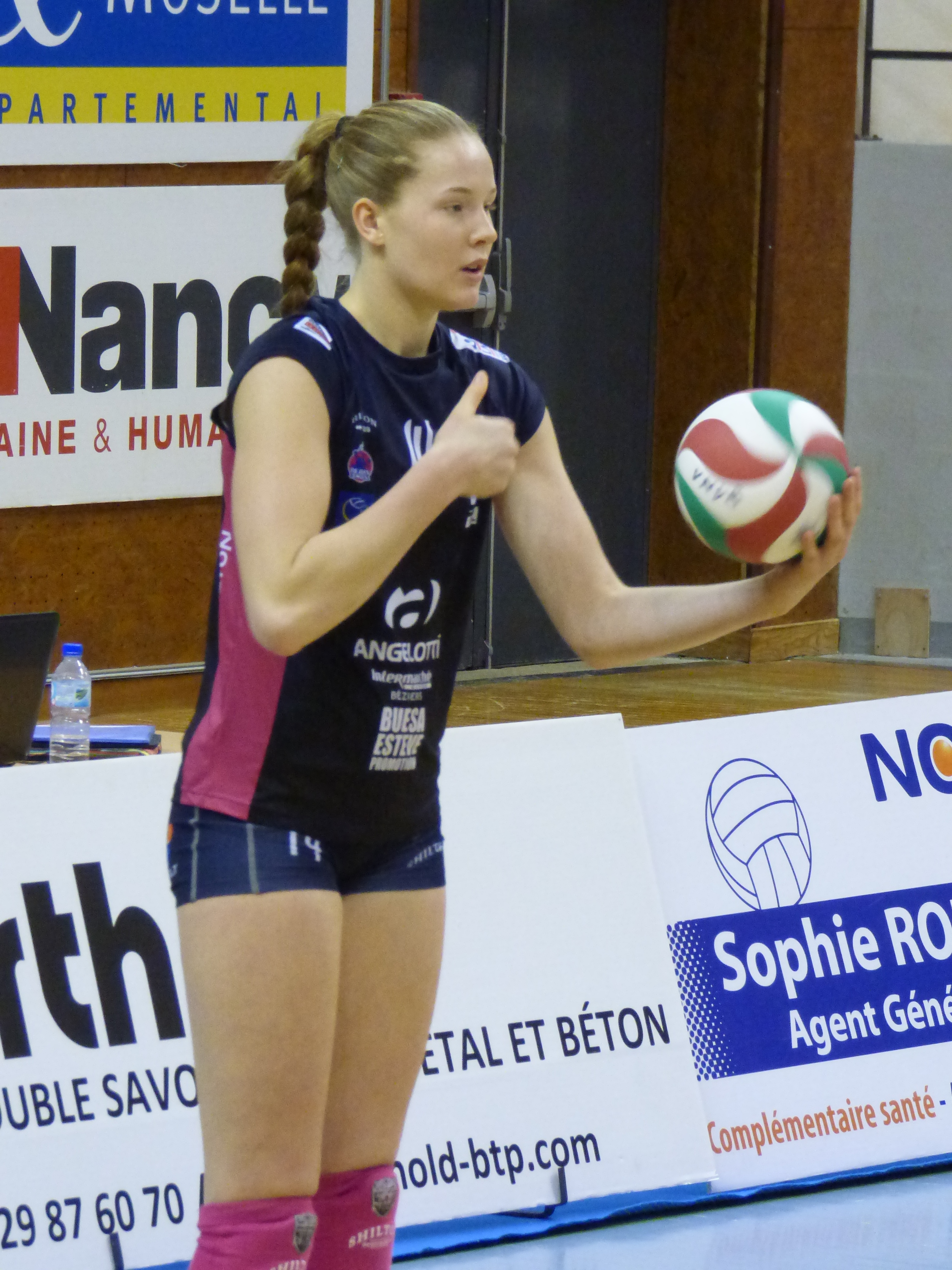
Haak playing for Béziers in 2016

Haak started playing volleyball at the youth teams of her hometown club Engelholms VS and at the age of 14 made her debut for the first team in the Elitserien. She became part of the starting line-up of the team in the 2014/15 season and helped Engelholms VS win the Swedish Championship for two consecutive seasons. She was elected Player of the Year by the Swedish Volleyball Federation in both 2014/15 and 2015/16 seasons. In the early years of her career, Haak participated in beach volleyball as well as indoor volleyball. Together with her partner Fanny Åhman, she was fourth in the 2015 U18 European Championships in Riga.

After two successful seasons in Engelholm, Haak signed a contract with the French club Béziers VB for the 2016/17 season. With her new team, Haak reached the final at the French Cup where Béziers lost to Venelles 2–3 in a very closely contested match. She was the top scorer of the French League in the regular season, and voted the MVP and the best opposite spiker of the season. Despite finishing third in the regular season, Béziers were defeated by the defending champions sixth-seeded Saint-Raphaël at the first round of the playoffs. At the end of the season, Haak joined the Italian side Savino Del Bene Scandicci.

In her first season in Italy, Haak became the scoring champion of the league with 491 points, averaging the season's highest 6.14 points per set, and was selected for the All Star game while her team Scandicci finished the regular season in second place, just one point behind Igor Gorgonzola Novara. In the playoffs, Scandicci eliminated Volley Pesaro in the first round but lost to Imoco Volley Conegliano in the semifinals.

After two seasons in Italy, Haak joined VakıfBank S.K. in 2019. With the Turkish club she won both the Turkish Cup and the Turkish League in the 2020/21 season. Isabelle Haak was also selected as the MVP in the Turkish League this season. In Haak's third season playing for VakifBank S.K. (the 2021/22 season) she won 5 out of 5 titles with her club: The Turkish Super Cup, the FIVB Club World Championship, the Turkish Cup, the Turkish League and the CEV Champions League. Haak received the MVP awards in both the Club World Championship and the Turkish Cup.

In 2022, Haak left Turkey and went back to play in the Italian LVF Serie A1 league but this time for Imoco Volley Conegliano. With her new club she won 4 out of 5 titles in her first season: The Italian Super Cup, the FIVB Club World Championship, the Italian Cup and the Italian League. Haak once again received the MVP award in the Club World Championship and she also received the MVP award in the Italian Cup.

== International career ==
Haak made her international debut with the Swedish national volleyball team against Latvia on 10 May 2014 at the age of fourteen, and became the youngest ever volleyball player to represent Sweden at senior level. She was the member of the Swedish U19 teams that won the U19 NEVZA (North European Volleyball Zonal Association) Championships in 2014 and 2015.

== Personal life ==
Haak was born in Perstorp to a French father and a Swedish mother, but she later moved to Ängelholm shortly after her father had died of stomach cancer when she was 9 years old. Her older sister Anna is also a national volleyball player and was her teammate during her time in Engelholms VS.

== Awards ==
=== Individuals ===
- 2014–15 Elitserien "Player of the Year"
- 2014–15 Elitserien "Top Scorer"
- 2015–16 Elitserien "Player of the Year"
- 2015–16 Elitserien "Top Scorer"
- 2016–17 Ligue A Fémminine "Most valuable player"
- 2016–17 Ligue A Fémminine "Best opposite spiker"
- 2016–17 Ligue A Fémminine "Top Scorer"
- 2017–18 Lega Pallavolo Serie A Femminile "Top Scorer"
- 2019 FIVB Club World Championship "Best opposite"
- 2020–21 Turkish League "Most valuable player"
- 2020–21 CEV Champions League "Top Scorer"
- 2021 FIVB Club World Championship "Best opposite"
- 2021 FIVB Club World Championship "Most valuable player"
- 2021–22 Turkish Women's Volleyball Cup "Most valuable player"
- 2021–22 Turkish League "Best opposite"
- 2021–22 CEV Champions League "Top Scorer"
- 2021–22 Best Female Volleyball Player of the Year by CEV
- 2022 FIVB Club World Championship "Best opposite"
- 2022 FIVB Club World Championship "Most valuable player"
- 2022–23 Italian Cup (Coppa Italia) "Most valuable player"
- 2023–24 Italian League "Most valuable player"
- 2023–24 CEV Champions League "Most valuable player"
- 2024 European Golden League "Most valuable player"
- 2024 FIVB Club World Championship "Best opposite"

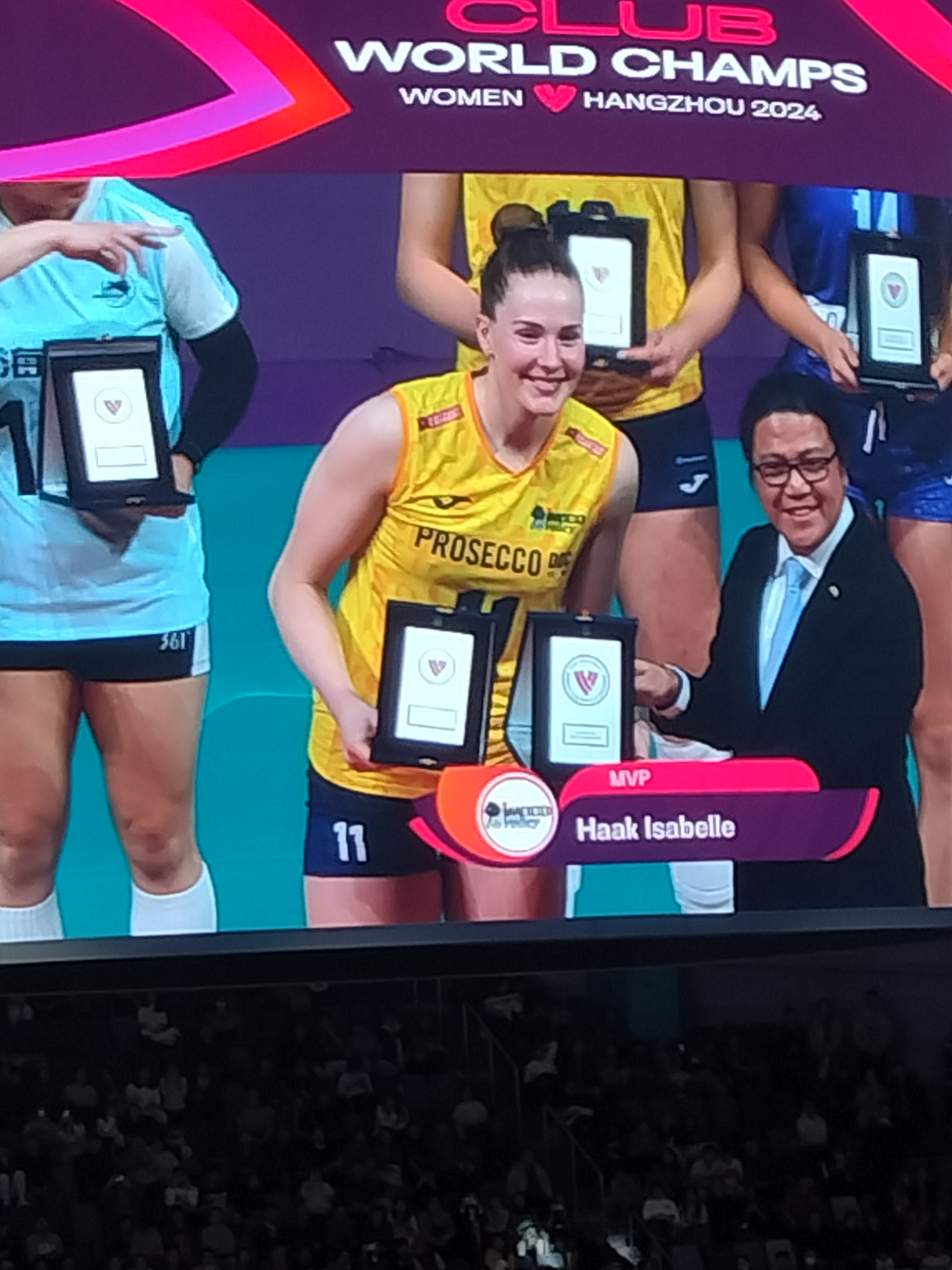
She was awarded the MVP at the 2024 FIVB Club World Championship

- 2024 FIVB Club World Championship "Most valuable player"
- 2024–25 Italian Cup (Coppa Italia) "Most valuable player"
- 2024–25 CEV Champions League "Most valuable player"
- 2025–26 Italian League "Most valuable player"
- 2026 European League "Most valuable player"
- 2026 Italian Super Cup (Supercoppa Italiana) "Most valuable player"

=== Clubs ===
- 2014–15 Elitserien – Champion, with Engelholms VS
- 2015–16 Elitserien – Champion, with Engelholms VS
- 2016–17 Coupe de France – Runner-Up, with Béziers VB
- 2019 Turkish Super Cup – Runner-Up, with VakıfBank S.K.
- 2019 FIVB Club World Championship – Bronze medal, with VakıfBank S.K.
- 2020 Turkish Super Cup – Runner-Up, with VakıfBank S.K.
- 2020–21 Turkish Women's Volleyball Cup – Champion, with VakıfBank S.K.
- 2020–21 Turkish League – Champion, with VakıfBank S.K.
- 2020–21 CEV Champions League – Runner-Up, with Vakıfbank S.K.
- 2021 Turkish Super Cup – Champion, with VakıfBank S.K.
- 2021 FIVB Club World Championship – Champion, with VakıfBank S.K.
- 2021–22 Turkish Women's Volleyball Cup – Champion, with VakıfBank S.K.
- 2021–22 Turkish League – Champion, with VakıfBank S.K.
- 2021–22 CEV Champions League – Champion, with Vakıfbank S.K.
- 2022 Italian Super Cup (Supercoppa Italiana) – Champion, with Imoco Volley
- 2022 FIVB Club World Championship – Champion, with Imoco Volley
- 2022–23 Italian Cup (Coppa Italia) – Champion, with Imoco Volley
- 2022–23 Italian League – Champion, with Imoco Volley
- 2023 Italian Super Cup (Supercoppa Italiana) – Champion, with Imoco Volley
- 2023–24 Italian Cup (Coppa Italia) – Champion, with Imoco Volley
- 2023–24 Italian League – Champion, with Imoco Volley
- 2023–24 CEV Champions League – Champion, with Imoco Volley
- 2024 Italian Super Cup (Supercoppa Italiana) – Champion, with Imoco Volley
- 2024 FIVB Club World Championship – Champion, with Imoco Volley
- 2024–25 Italian Cup (Coppa Italia) – Champion, with Imoco Volley
- 2024–25 Italian League – Champion, with Imoco Volley
- 2024–25 CEV Champions League – Champion, with Imoco Volley
- 2025 Italian Super Cup (Supercoppa Italiana) – Runner-Up, with Imoco Volley
- 2025 Club World Championship – Runner-Up, with Imoco Volley
- 2025–26 Italian Cup (Coppa Italia) – Champion, with Imoco Volley
- 2025–26 Italian League – Champion, with Imoco Volley
- 2026 Italian Super Cup (Supercoppa Italiana) – Champion, with Imoco Volley

=== National team ===
==== Junior team ====
- 2014 U19 NEVZA Championship – Gold Medal
- 2015 U19 NEVZA Championship – Gold Medal

==== Senior team ====
- 2018 European Silver League – Gold Medal
- 2022 European Silver League – Gold Medal
- 2023 European Golden League – Silver Medal
- 2024 European Golden League – Gold Medal
- 2026 European League – Gold Medal
