= Newcastle (Staffs) Volleyball Club =

Volleyball club based in Staffordshire, England

Newcastle Staffs. VC
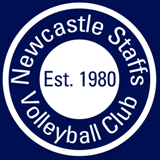
- Newcastle (Staffs) VC logo
- Full name: Newcastle (Staffs) Volleyball Club
- Nicknames: Castle, Staffs,
- Founded: 1980
- Ground: Keele University
- Capacity: 110 seated
- Chair: Will Roberts
- League: Men 1 - NVL1; Men 2 - NVL3North; Women - NVL2North

Newcastle (Staffs) Volleyball Club is an English volleyball club based in Newcastle-under-Lyme, Staffordshire, England which is affiliated with Volleyball England, with teams competing at the national level for women, men, girls and boys in all three formats of the sport - Volleyball, Sitting Volleyball and Beach Volleyball. Formed in 1980, the club is best known for its tradition of junior development and has produced a number of England's leading talents in the sport. The construction of Beach Volleyball courts at Keele University in 2016 provided the club with the opportunity to continue its development through this form of the game.

The club was formed following the amalgamation of two school teams in Newcastle-under-Lyme: Marshlands High School (now Wolstanton)] and Edward Orme High School (now Newcastle Community)]. The two schools had developed a strong cohort of predominantly-male volleyball players; as they grew older, the players needed to play at a higher level. The club was formed and its teams rose quickly through local and regional leagues to national-league status. When it reached the lower reaches of the National League promotion came quickly, until the top flight was reached during the mid-1980s. The women's team was formed during the late 1990s from two teams (Cheadle High School and Stone Alleynes High School), both of which had success at local level; however, until they combined they could not move to a higher level. The combined team entered the West Midlands Regional League; during the mid-2000s, it progressed to play in the National League. From 2008–2010 the women's team underwent more changes, with a new generation of young players graduating from the club's junior ranks. During the 2010–2011 season, the women's team won the national under-18 championship, the NVL 2 North title and the National Shield.

Despite winning a number of national junior titles, the club has been less successful at the senior level. In 2002 the club embarked on a programme of growth centred on Madeley High School, which has spread across all four school-sports partnerships in North Staffordshire, a Talented Athlete Programme (TAP) at the City of Stoke-on-Trent Sixth Form College and links to three higher-education institutions (Keele University, Staffordshire University and Manchester Metropolitan University-Cheshire). September 2010 saw the opening of the Volleyball England National Academy, based in Loughborough; of the academy's first intake, six boys and two girls play for the club and are eligible for a formal daily training programme linked to the national squad as part of the England performance pathway. The 2010–2011 season saw three of the club's junior teams reaching the national finals, with the under-18 boys and girls both winning titles and the under-16 boys losing the final. Since then, no titles have been won, but teams have reached the final stages of competitions in every season - and in 2016 the men's 1st team lost 3-2 in a fantastic National Shield Final against Solent, after having missed out on promotion to the Super 8s (the elite league) the previous season in a play-off against London Lynx.

Twice winner of the Volleyball England Club of the Year Award since 2000, chair Colin Roberts and other members have received a number of awards for their work with the club. Roberts received the National Leadership Award by the Institute of Sport, Parks and Leisure (ISPAL) in summer 2009, and was runner-up for the Service to Sport award at the City of Stoke-on-Trent Sports Awards in early 2010 after receiving the Volleyball England "Volunteer of the Year" award in 2008 (12 months after fellow club member Rod Stockwell received the same honour). In 2016 the club completed the long process of becoming a charity, based on its focus on supporting the development of young people in the local community by raising aspirations.

In 2012, inspired by the London Olympic Games and a burst of additional interest in the sport, the club launched its social section which is thriving, and still growing four years later. This section of the club focuses on fun and participation in an active lifestyle through volleyball.

2014 saw the creation of a Sitting Volleyball section of the club, through the emergence of local players with an interest and enthusiasm for the Paralympic version of the sport, and the need of a number of leading players around England to have a team to play for. In their two seasons the team has finished 2nd in the leading national competition (Volleyball England Sitting Volleyball Grand Prix) twice, and lost in the National Cup final on one occasion.

In 2016 the England National Team returned to the court for the first time since it surrendered status to Great Britain for the 2012 Olympic Games - and competed in the CEV European Championships qualification round in Norway in May. Captaining the team was Newcastle Staffs. alumni Adam Bradbury (now playing professionally in Sweden for Vingakers), and along with fellow Staffs 'old boy' Sam Shenton (now playing for Team Northumbria) the team made great strides losing 3-1 versus Norway and Israel, but beating Hungary 3-2.

== Honours ==
Newcastle has won a number of English national volleyball titles, predominantly in the junior age groups; a number of players have been recognised at the international level. In 2010 the national under-18 champion boys' team travelled to Castellana Grotte in southern Italy for the inaugural EuroVolley Cup 2010 (a European junior boys club competition supported by the European Volleyball Confederation (CEV) and the Italian federation. The team won two of its nine matches, finishing in eighth place.

=== National competitions ===
Title	Years won	Years runner-up
NVL Men 1		1994/95, 1995/96, 1998/99
National Cup Men		1996/97, 2001/02
National Shield Men	2006/07	2015/16, 2003/04
National Shield Women	2010/11	
NVL Men 2	1984/85	
NVL Women 2 North	2010/11	
National u20 Men	1991/92, 1992/93, 1993/94	
National u19 Men	1982/83, 1983/84, 1984/85, 1985/86	1979/80, 1980/81, 1981/82, 1982/83
National u18 Men	2009/10, 2010/11	1990/91, 1995/96, 2011/12
National u18 Women	2010/11	2011/12
National u16 Boys	1979/80, 1981/82, 2008/09.	1980/81, 1981/82, 1982/1983, 1989/90, 2005/06, 2010/11
National u16 Girls		2007/08, 2009/10
National u15 Boys	1978/79, 1980/81, 1982/83, 2004/05, 2007/08	1979/80, 1988/89, 2012/13
National u15 Girls	2007/08	
National u14 Boys		2007/08, 2008/09
National u14 Girls	2007/08	
Sitting Volleyball Grand Prix		2014/15, 2015/16
Sitting Volleyball National Cup		2014/15

=== International-level players ===
Player's highest honour only (i.e. if GB, England not recorded)

Great Britain	England	England senior development	England juniors	England cadets
Richard Dobell	James Bannister	Dave Lawton		
Sam Bragg	Tim Hollis	Paige Nelmes (GB Junior Beach)	Sam Allen	Alex Liebeck
Megan Viggars	Steve Fee	Roman Neveykin	James Goodwin	Chris Ashton
	Tom Stevens	Rashad Ali	George Wainwright	Alex Hague
	Neil Masters	Rupert Scott	Luke Davenport	Rob Bellamy
	Adam Bradbury			Rosie Barley
	Sam Shenton		Stewart Ross	
	Patrick Cawthorn		Iain McKellar	
			Alex Jenkins	
			Rich James	
