= 2019–20 CEV Champions League qualification =

This article shows the qualification phase for 2019–20 CEV Champions League. 10 teams will play in qualification round. The two remaining teams will join the other 18 teams automatically qualified to the League round based on the European Cups' Ranking List. All 8 eliminated teams will then compete in 2019–20 Men's CEV Cup.

== Participating teams ==
Drawing of Lots took place on 26 June 2019 in Luxembourg.

| Rank | Country | Team(s) | Outcome (Qualified to) |
|---|---|---|---|
| 11 | Austria | SK Zadruga Aich | CEV Cup |
| 12 | Serbia | Vojvodina NS Seme Novi Sad | CEV Champions League |
| 14 | Finland | Vammalan Lentopallo Sastmala | CEV Cup |
| 16 | Montenegro | OK Budva | CEV Cup |
| 18 | Belarus | Shakhtior Soligorsk | CEV Cup |
| 20 | Romania | CS Arcada Galați | CEV Cup |
| 25 | Bosnia and Herzegovina | OK Mladost Brcko | CEV Cup |
| 25 | Croatia | Mladost Zagreb | CEV Cup |
| 31 | England | IBB Polonia London | CEV Cup |
| 50 | Portugal | SL Benfica Lisboa | CEV Champions League |

== First round ==
- 4 teams compete in the first round
- Winners advance to the second round and losers will play in CEV Cup
- All times are Home team time.

| Team 1 | Agg. | Team 2 | 1st leg | 2nd leg |
|---|---|---|---|---|
| Mladost Zagreb (Croatia) | 6–0 | (England) IBB Polonia London | 3–0 | 3–0 |
| OK Mladost Brcko (Bosnia and Herzegovina) | 0–6 | (Portugal) SL Benfica Lisboa | 0–3 | 0–3 |

=== First leg ===
| Date | Time | | Score | | Set 1 | Set 2 | Set 3 | Set 4 | Set 5 | Total | Report |
|---|---|---|---|---|---|---|---|---|---|---|---|
| 22 Oct | 20:00 | Mladost Zagreb (Croatia) | 3–0 | (England) IBB Polonia London | 25–11 | 25–17 | 25–14 | | | 75–42 | Report |
| 23 Oct | 17:00 | OK Mladost Brcko (Bosnia and Herzegovina) | 0–3 | (Portugal) SL Benfica Lisboa | 22–25 | 17–25 | 21–25 | | | 60–75 | Report |

=== Second leg ===
| Date | Time | | Score | | Set 1 | Set 2 | Set 3 | Set 4 | Set 5 | Total | Report |
|---|---|---|---|---|---|---|---|---|---|---|---|
| 30 Oct | 19:00 | IBB Polonia London (England) | 0–3 | (Croatia) Mladost Zagreb | 9–25 | 12–25 | 22–25 | | | 43–75 | Report |
| 29 Oct | 20:00 | SL Benfica Lisboa (Portugal) | 3–0 | (Bosnia and Herzegovina) OK Mladost Brcko | 25–18 | 32–30 | 25–18 | | | 82–66 | Report |

== Second round ==
- 6 teams received byes in the second round.
- Winners advance to the third round and losers will play in CEV Cup.
- All times are Home team time.

| Team 1 | Agg. | Team 2 | 1st leg | 2nd leg | Golden Set |
|---|---|---|---|---|---|
| Mladost Zagreb (Croatia) | 3–3 | (Austria) SK Zadruga Aich | 3–1 | 1–3 | 15–9 |
| SL Benfica Lisboa (Portugal) | 6–0 | (Montenegro) OK Budva | 3–0 | 3–1 | |
| Shakhtior Soligorsk (Belarus) | 6–0 | (Finland) Vammalan Lentopallo Sastmala | 3–0 | 3–0 | |
| CS Arcada Galați (Romania) | 3–3 | (Serbia) Vojvodina NS Seme Novi Sad | 3–0 | 1–3 | 11–15 |

=== First leg ===
| Date | Time | | Score | | Set 1 | Set 2 | Set 3 | Set 4 | Set 5 | Total | Report |
|---|---|---|---|---|---|---|---|---|---|---|---|
| 7 Nov | 18:30 | Mladost Zagreb (Croatia) | 3–1 | (Austria) SK Zadruga Aich | 22–25 | 25–18 | 25–21 | 25–14 | | 97–78 | Report |
| 5 Nov | 17:30 | SL Benfica Lisboa (Portugal) | 3–0 | (Montenegro) OK Budva | 25–15 | 25–17 | 25–18 | | | 75–50 | Report |
| 6 Nov | 18:00 | Shakhtior Soligorsk (Belarus) | 3–0 | (Finland) Vammalan Lentopallo Sastmala | 29–27 | 25–22 | 25–13 | | | 79–62 | Report |
| 6 Nov | 17:00 | CS Arcada Galați (Romania) | 3–0 | (Serbia) Vojvodina NS Seme Novi Sad | 25–23 | 25–17 | 25–21 | | | 75–61 | Report |

=== Second leg ===
| Date | Time | | Score | | Set 1 | Set 2 | Set 3 | Set 4 | Set 5 | Total | Report |
|---|---|---|---|---|---|---|---|---|---|---|---|
| 13 Nov | 20:15 | SK Zadruga Aich (Austria) | 3–1 | (Croatia) Mladost Zagreb | 26–28 | 25–18 | 28–26 | 25–23 | | 104–95 | Report |
| Golden set | | SK Zadruga Aich (Austria) | 9–15 | (Croatia) Mladost Zagreb | | | | | | | |
| 14 Nov | 17:45 | OK Budva (Montenegro) | 1–3 | (Portugal) SL Benfica Lisboa | 25–15 | 21–25 | 23–25 | 25–27 | | 94–92 | Report |
| 14 Nov | 18:30 | Vammalan Lentopallo Sastmala (Finland) | 0–3 | (Belarus) Shakhtior Soligorsk | 22–25 | 22–25 | 21–25 | | | 65–75 | Report |
| 13 Nov | 17:30 | Vojvodina NS Seme Novi Sad (Serbia) | 3–1 | (Romania) CS Arcada Galați | 25–20 | 21–25 | 25–21 | 25–22 | | 96–88 | Report |
| Golden set | | Vojvodina NS Seme Novi Sad (Serbia) | 15–11 | (Romania) CS Arcada Galați | | | | | | | |

== Third round ==
- 4 teams from second round compete in the third round.
- Winners enter the League round and losers will play in CEV Cup.
- All times are Home team time.

| Team 1 | Agg. | Team 2 | 1st leg | 2nd leg |
|---|---|---|---|---|
| SL Benfica Lisboa (Portugal) | 6–0 | (Croatia) Mladost Zagreb | 3–0 | 3–1 |
| Vojvodina NS Seme Novi Sad (Serbia) | 6–0 | (Belarus) Shakhtior Soligorsk | 3–0 | 3–0 |

=== First leg ===
| Date | Time | | Score | | Set 1 | Set 2 | Set 3 | Set 4 | Set 5 | Total | Report |
|---|---|---|---|---|---|---|---|---|---|---|---|
| 20 Nov | 20:00 | SL Benfica Lisboa (Portugal) | 3–0 | (Croatia) Mladost Zagreb | 25–22 | 25–20 | 25–22 | | | 75–64 | Report |
| 21 Nov | 18:00 | Vojvodina NS Seme Novi Sad (Serbia) | 3–0 | (Belarus) Shakhtior Soligorsk | 25–21 | 25–18 | 25–18 | | | 75–57 | Report |

=== Second leg ===
| Date | Time | | Score | | Set 1 | Set 2 | Set 3 | Set 4 | Set 5 | Total | Report |
|---|---|---|---|---|---|---|---|---|---|---|---|
| 27 Nov | 20:00 | Mladost Zagreb (Croatia) | 1–3 | (Portugal) SL Benfica Lisboa | 20–25 | 19–25 | 25–20 | 21–25 | | 85–95 | Report |
| 27 Nov | 17:00 | Shakhtior Soligorsk (Belarus) | 0–3 | (Serbia) Vojvodina NS Seme Novi Sad | 23–25 | 18–25 | 22–25 | | | 63–75 | Report |
