= NEVZA Clubs Championship =

Volleyball competition

- Sport: Volleyball
- Founded: 2007; 19 years ago
- Administrator: NEVZA
- Country: 8 NEVZA members
- Continent: Europe
- Website: http://www.nevza.org/volleyball/

The North European Men's Volleyball Club Championship (English. Nordic Club Championships, szw. Nordiska klubbmästerskapen) is a volleyball championship for clubs from the Nordic countries. It was established in 2007 and is organised by the North European Volleyball Zonal Association (NEVZA). Clubs from 8 NEVZA members competing every year in this competition, Teams from other neighbouring countries may be invited such as Estonia, Lithuania, Latvia.

== Winners list ==
| Years | Host | Champions | Runners-up | Third place |
|---|---|---|---|---|
| 2008 | (Finland) Raisio | (Finland) Raision Loimu | (Sweden) Falkenbergs VBK | (Norway) Førde VBK |
| 2009 | (Sweden) Falkenberg | (Denmark) BK Marienlyst | (Sweden) Falkenbergs VBK | (Denmark) Middelfart VK |
| 2010 | (Sweden) Sollentuna | (Denmark) BK Marienlyst | (Denmark) Middelfart VK | (Sweden) Falkenbergs VBK |
| 2011 | (Denmark) Middelfart | (Norway) Førde VBK | (Denmark) BK Marienlyst | (Denmark) Middelfart VK |
| 2012 | (Denmark) Gentofte | (Denmark) BK Marienlyst | (Norway) Nyborg VBK | (Denmark) Gentofte Volley |
| 2013 | (Sweden) Falkenberg | (Norway) Nyborg VBK | (Sweden) Falkenbergs VBK | (Denmark) BK Marienlyst |
| 2014 | (Denmark) Odense | (Sweden) Falkenbergs VBK | (Norway) Nyborg VBK | (Denmark) Middelfart VK |
| 2015 | (Sweden) Linköping | (Sweden) Linköpings VC | (Norway) Nyborg VBK | (Sweden) Falkenbergs VBK |
| 2016 | (Norway) Bergen | (Norway) Nyborg VBK | (Denmark) BK Marienlyst | (Denmark) Gentofte Volley |
| 2017 | (Sweden) Falkenberg | (Sweden) Falkenbergs VBK | (Denmark) Gentofte Volley | (Norway) BK Tromsø |
| 2018 | (Norway) Straume, Fjell | (Norway) TIF Viking | (Denmark) BK Marienlyst | (Norway) BK Tromsø |
| 2019 | (Denmark) Ishøj | (England) Polonia London | (Denmark) BK Marienlyst | (Denmark) Hvidovre VK |
| 2020 | competition cancelled | | | |

== Winners by club ==
| # | Clubs | Titles | Winning years |
|---|---|---|---|
| 1 | (Denmark) BK Marienlyst | 3 | 2009, 2010, 2012 |
| 1 | (Norway) Nyborg Viking | 3 | 2013, 2016, 2018 |
| 3 | (Sweden) Falkenbergs VBK | 2 | 2014, 2017 |
| 4 | (Finland) Raision Loimu | 1 | 2008 |
| 4 | (Norway) Førde VBK | 1 | 2011 |
| 4 | (Sweden) Linköpings VC | 1 | 2015 |
| 4 | (England) Polonia London | 1 | 2019 |

== Winners by nations ==
| # | Nation | Gold | Silver | Bronze | Total |
|---|---|---|---|---|---|
| 1 | Norway | 4 | 3 | 3 | 10 |
| 2 | Denmark | 3 | 6 | 7 | 16 |
| 3 | Sweden | 3 | 3 | 2 | 8 |
| 4 | England | 1 | | | 1 |
| = | Finland | 1 | | - | 1 |
