= NEVZA Women's Clubs Championship =

Volleyball championship for clubs from the Nordic countries

- Sport: Volleyball
- Founded: 2007; 19 years ago
- Administrator: NEVZA
- Country: 8 NEVZA members
- Continent: Europe
- Website: http://www.nevza.org/volleyball/

The North European Women's Volleyball Club Championship (English. Nordic Club Championships, szw. Nordiska klubbmästerskapen) is a volleyball championship for clubs from the Nordic countries. It was established in 2007 and is organised by the North European Volleyball Zonal Association (NEVZA). In addition to the Nordic countries (Norway, Sweden, Finland, Denmark, Iceland, Faroe Islands and Greenland) other neighbouring countries may be invited such as Estonia, Lithuania, Latvia and the United Kingdom.

== Winners list ==
Years	Host	Champions	Runners-up	Third place
2008	(Finland) Salo	(Finland) Salon Viesti	(Finland) Someron Pallo	(Norway) Koll Volley
2009	(Sweden) Ängelholm	(Finland) LP Viesti Salo	(Estonia) GMP Tallinn	(Sweden) Engelholms VS
2010	(Finland) Somero	(Sweden) Engelholms VS	(Estonia) GMP Tallinn	(Finland) Someron Pallo
2011	(Sweden) Ängelholm	(Sweden) Engelholms VS	(Sweden) Lindesberg VBK	(Sweden) Katrineholms VK
2012	(Norway) Trondheim	(Norway) Oslo Volley	(Norway) Stod Volley	(Denmark) Holte IF
2013	(Denmark) Holte	(Norway) Stod Volley	(Denmark) Holte IF	(Norway) Oslo Volley
2014	(Sweden) Gislaved	(Norway) Stod Volley	(Sweden) Gislaveds VBK	(Norway) Oslo Volley
2015	(Denmark) Holte	(Norway) Stod Volley	(Sweden) Engelholms VS	(Norway) Oslo Volley
2016	(Sweden) Ängelholm	(Denmark) Brøndby VK	(Sweden) Engelholms VS	(Norway) Oslo Volley
2017	(Denmark) Brøndby	(Denmark) Holte IF	(Denmark) Brøndby VK	(Denmark) Amager VK
2018	(Denmark) Brøndby	(Denmark) Brøndby VK	(Norway) Førde VBK	(Norway) Oslo Volley
2019	(Sweden) Ängelholm	(Sweden) Engelholms VS	(Norway) ToppVolley Norge	(Denmark) Brøndby VK
2020	(England) London	(Denmark) Brøndby VK	(England) Polonia SideOut London	(Norway) ToppVolley Norge

== Winners by club ==
#	Clubs	Titles	Winning years
1	(Sweden) Engelholms VS	3	2010, 2011, 2019
1	(Norway) Stod Volley	3	2013, 2014, 2015
1	(Denmark) Brøndby VK	3	2016, 2018, 2020
4	(Finland) Salon Viesti	1	2008
4	(Finland) LP Viesti Salo	1	2009
4	(Norway) Oslo Volley	1	2012
4	(Denmark) Holte IF	1	2017

== Winners by nations ==
#	Nation	Gold	Silver	Bronze	Total
1	Norway	4	3	7	14
2	Denmark	4	2	3	9
3	Sweden	3	4	2	9
4	Finland	2	1	1	4
5	Estonia	-	2	-	2
6	England	-	1	-	1
