= Armageddon Tour =

2012 concert tour by Guy Sebastian

- Tour by Guy Sebastian
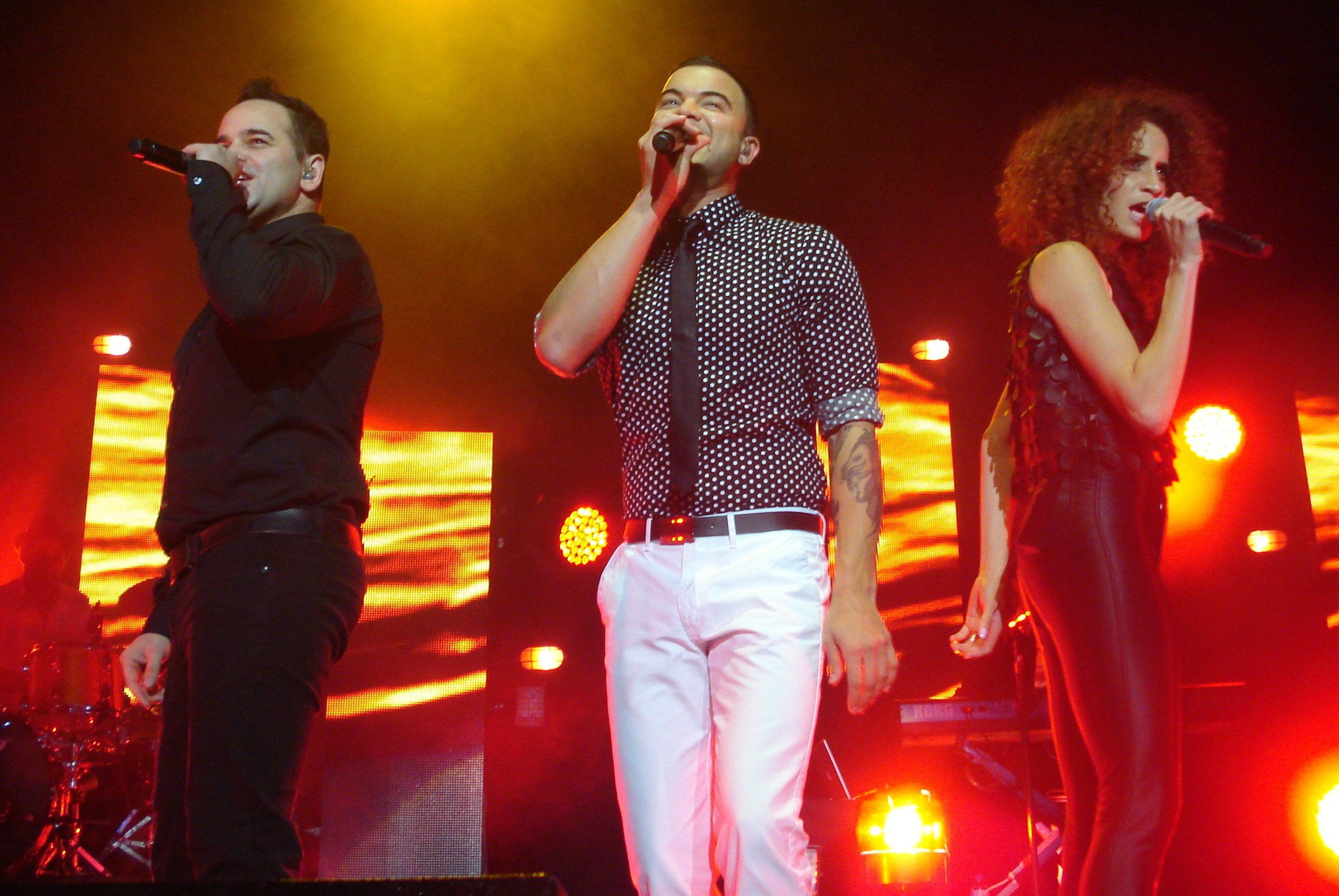
- Sebastian, Carmen Smith and Gary Pinto performing on the Armaggedon Tour
- Associated album: Armageddon
- Start date: 1 June 2012
- End date: 1 July 2012
- Legs: 1
- No. of shows: 20 in Australia

Guy Sebastian concert chronology
- Like It Like That Tour (2010); Armageddon Tour (2012); Get Along Tour (2013)

Armageddon Tour was the 9th concert tour by Australian recording artist Guy Sebastian. The tour supported his upcoming sixth studio album Armageddon. The tour visited metropolitan and regional areas in Australia. In 2012, Sebastian announced that the title of his new album was to be Armageddon. Sebastian toured nationally ahead of the album's release in 20 dates across the country. He kicked off in Cessnock on 1 June 2012 and finished up on the Sunshine Coast on 1 July 2012. He toured in places he had not previously performed.

== Background ==
Sebastian toured nationally during June and July 2012. The 20 date tour had concerts in all capital cities and also in regional areas of New South Wales, Victoria and Queensland. Originally scheduled to promote the album after its release, the tour became a showcase for the new songs. An extra concert at the Palais Theatre, Victoria was added to film footage for the deluxe edition of the album. Sebastian performed songs from previous albums as well as new songs. He felt it was the best tour he had done, saying "I pretty much put every cent back into the tour and really stepped up the production and the lighting, it's a lot bigger and better. I'm playing some 3000-seat venues and a bunch of them are sold out, so I want to make sure I'm not compromising. I didn't want to fall short, and it has come up great, better than I thought."

Sebastian invited Ben Burgess, a musician friend from the US, to tour with him. He performed Fiasco's rap on "Battle Scars" and was also the support act. Due to Carmen Smith's disqualification from The Voice she was able to participate on the tour. She performed backing vocals along with Gary Pinto, and also the featured parts for "Art of Love" and "Who's That Girl". Smith also performed "Armageddon" with Sebastian, as at the time he had been thinking of having a featured artist on the track. There was speculation in the media that Channel Nine's The Voice had issues with Sebastian, when The Voice contestants including his own brother Chris were barred from attending one of the concerts. Sebastian is a judge and mentor on The X Factor which is aired on the Seven Network. Channel Nine blamed it on scheduling and security problems, while the show's producers declined to comment.

== Tour dates ==
Date	City	Country	Venue
1 June 2012	Cessnock	Australia	Cessnock Performing Arts Centre
2 June 2012	Sydney	Australia	Hordern Pavilion
5 June 2012	Tamworth	Australia	Capitol Theatre
6 June 2012	Dubbo	Australia	Dubbo Regional Theatre
8 June 2012	Canberra	Australia	Canberra Theatre
9 June 2012	Orange	Australia	Orange Civic Theatre
10 June 2012	Wollongong	Australia	Illawarra Performing Arts Centre
13 June 2012	Ballarat	Australia	Her Majesty's Theatre
14 June 2012	Wangaratta	Australia	Alpine MDF Theatre
16 June 2012	Melbourne	Australia	Palais Theatre
17 June 2012	Geelong	Australia	Geelong Performing Arts Centre
19 June 2012	Perth	Australia	His Majesty's Theatre
20 June 2012	Mandurah	Australia	Mandurah Performing Arts Centre
22 June 2012	Adelaide	Australia	Thebarton Theatre
23 June 2012	Hobart	Australia	Derwent Entertainment Centre
27 June 2012	Taree	Australia	Manning Entertainment Centre
28 June 2012	Port Macquarie	Australia	Glasshouse
29 June 2012	Brisbane	Australia	QPAC Concert Hall
30 June 2012	Gold Coast	Australia	Jupiters Theatre
1 July 2012	Nambour	Australia	Nambour Civic Centre
