= Loyola Ramblers men's volleyball =

American college volleyball team

- University: Loyola University Chicago
- Head coach: Shane Davis (15th season)
- Conference: MIVA
- Location: Chicago, Illinois, US
- Home arena: Joseph J. Gentile Arena (capacity: 4,486)
- Nickname: Ramblers
- Colors: Maroon and gold

NCAA tournament champion
- 2014, 2015

NCAA tournament semifinal
- 2013, 2014, 2015

NCAA tournament appearance
- 2013, 2014, 2015, 2025, 2026

Conference tournament champion
- 2013, 2014, 2015, 2025

Conference regular season champion
- 2002, 2005, 2006, 2013, 2014, 2018, 2023, 2025

The Loyola Ramblers men's volleyball team (also Loyola Chicago Ramblers) represents Loyola University Chicago in NCAA competition as a member of the Midwestern Intercollegiate Volleyball Association (MIVA), one of the seven conferences competing at the NCAA National Collegiate level. (Note: The NCAA designates championship events that are open to members of more than one of the NCAA's three divisions as "National Collegiate". In the case of men's volleyball, the top-level championship is open to members of Divisions I and II.) Shane Davis coaches the Ramblers. He returned as head coach in 2024 after eight seasons leading the Northwestern University women's volleyball team. Davis previously coached Loyola from 2003 to 2015. In 13 seasons as Loyola's head coach, he has an overall record of 290-92 (.759) and led the Ramblers to back-to-back NCAA championships in 2014 and 2015.

In 2013, the Ramblers (22–10) made their first appearance in the NCAA men's collegiate volleyball tournament. They were defeated 0–3 (24–26, 18–25, 27–29) by the UCI Anteaters in the first semifinal on May 2, 2013, at UCLA's Pauley Pavilion.

On May 3, 2014, Loyola (29–1) hosted the 2014 Championships and defeated the Stanford Cardinal (24–9) 3–1 to win the program's first NCAA Men's National Collegiate Volleyball Championship.

On May 10, 2015, Loyola (28–2) defeated the Lewis Flyers (26–4) in a thrilling 3–2 match to win back-to-back NCAA Men's National Collegiate Volleyball Championships.

== NCAA Tournament results ==
Year	Seed	Round	Opponent	Result
2013	3	Semi-Finals	UC Irvine	L 0–3
2014	1	Semi-Finals; National Championship	Penn State; Stanford	W 3–2; W 3–1
2015	3	Quarter-Finals; Semi-Finals; National Championship	Pfeiffer; UC Irvine; Lewis	W 3–0; W 3–0; W 3–2
2025	4	Quarter-Finals	Pepperdine	L 1–3
2026		Regional Round; Regional Finals	St. Francis; LBSU	W 3–0; L 0–3

== Yearly records ==
Season	Coach	Overall	Conference	Standing	Postseason
Gordon Mayforth (Midwestern Intercollegiate Volleyball Association) (1996–2002)
1996	Gordon Mayforth	14-14	6-8	4th	
1997	Gordon Mayforth	18-13	7-9	5th	
1998	Gordon Mayforth	24-8	8-4	2nd	
1999	Gordon Mayforth	19-9	8-6	4th	
2000	Gordon Mayforth	15-12	6-9	4th	
2001	Gordon Mayforth	19-10	10-6	4th	
2002	Gordon Mayforth	24-6	14-4	T-1st	
Gordon Mayforth:		134-72 (.650)	59-46 (.578)		
Tim O'Brien (Midwestern Intercollegiate Volleyball Association) (2003–2003)
2003	Tim O'Brien	20–7	14-2	2nd	
Tim O'Brien:		20-7 (.740)	14-2 (.875)		
Shane Davis (Midwestern Intercollegiate Volleyball Association) (2004–2015)					
2004	Shane Davis	20-8	12-4	2nd	
2005	Shane Davis	26-3	15-1	1st	
2006	Shane Davis	23-7	11-1	1st	
2007	Shane Davis	23-7	8-4	T-3rd	
2008	Shane Davis	17-14	7-5	4th	
2009	Shane Davis	17-10	5-5	4th	
2010	Shane Davis	20-6	10-2	2nd	
2011	Shane Davis	21-8	9-3	2nd	
2012	Shane Davis	19-12	8-4	3rd	
2013	Shane Davis	22-10	10-4	T-1st	NCAA Tournament Semifinals
2014	Shane Davis	29-1	14-0	1st	NCAA Tournament Champions
2015	Shane Davis	28-2	14-2	2nd	NCAA Tournament Champions
Shane Davis:		265-88 (.751)	123-35 (.778)		
Mark Hulse (Midwestern Intercollegiate Volleyball Association) (2016–2022)
2016	Mark Hulse	20-8	12-4	2nd	
2017	Mark Hulse	16-12	9–7	5th	
2018	Mark Hulse	23-7	11-3	T-1st	
2019	Mark Hulse	21-8	12-2	2nd	
2020	Mark Hulse	7-11	4-4		
2021	Mark Hulse	15-6	9-5	2nd	
2022	Mark Hulse	18-9	11-3	2nd	
Mark Hulse:		120-61 (.663)	68-28 (.696)		
John Hawks (Midwestern Intercollegiate Volleyball Association) (2023–2024)
2023	John Hawks	21-7	11-3	T-1st	
2024	John Hawks	19-10	12-4	2nd	
John Hawks:		40-17 (.701)	23-7 (.766)		
Shane Davis (Midwestern Intercollegiate Volleyball Association) (2025–present)
2025	Shane Davis	25-4	13-3	T-1st	NCAA Tournament Quarterfinals
2026	Shane Davis	21-9	12-4	2nd	NCAA Tournament Regional Finals
Shane Davis:		310-101 (.754)	148-42 (.778)		
Total:		625-258 (.708)	312-125 (.713)		
National champion Postseason invitational champion Conference regular season champion Conference regular season and conference tournament champion Division regular season champion Division regular season and conference tournament champion Conference tournament champion

== All-Americans ==
The Loyola men's volleyball program has seen 51 AVCA All American honors (including Honorable Mentions).

Year	AVCA All-Americans
1998	Dan Schultz (2nd)
2002	Brad Stoub (2nd)
2003	Shane Davis (2nd), Justin Schnor (2nd)
2005	Scott Greene (2nd), Krystian Krzyzak (2nd)
2006	James Grunst (1st), Chris Kozlarek (1st)
2007	James Grunst (2nd)
2011	Mike Bunting (2nd)
2012	Joe Smalzer (2nd)
2013	Joe Smalzer (2nd)
2014	Thomas Jaeschke (1st), Joe Smalzer (HM), Cody Caldwell (HM), Nick Olson (HM)
2015	Thomas Jaeschke (1st), Jeffrey Jendryk (2nd), Peter Hutz (2nd), Cody Caldwell (HM)
2016	Jeffrey Jendryk (2nd), Peter Hutz (HM), Nick Olson (HM)
2017	Jeffrey Jendryk (1st)
2018	Jeffrey Jendryk (1st), Collin Mahan (HM), Garrett Zolg (HM)
2019	Collin Mahan (2nd), Avery Aylsworth (HM), Paul Narup (HM), Garrett Zolg (HM)
2020	Kyle Piekarski (HM), Cole Schlothauer (HM)
2021	Cole Schlothauer (HM), Garret Zolg (HM)
2022	Cole Schlothauer (HM), Garret Zolg (HM), Parker Van Buren (HM)
2023	Parker Van Buren (2nd), Cole Schlothauer (HM), Dan Mangun (HM)
2024	Parker Van Buren (1st), Daniel Fabikovic (2nd), Nicodemus Meyer (HM)
2025	Parker Van Buren (1st), Daniel Fabikovic (2nd), Nicodemus Meyer (2nd), Ryan McElligott (HM)
2026	Aidan Klein (2nd), Daniel Fabikovic (HM), Josh Schellinger (HM)

== National awards ==
Year	National Coach of the Year	National Player of the Year	National Newcomer of the Year
2014	Shane Davis		
2015		Thomas Jaeschke	Jeff Jendryk
2024			Daniel Fabikovic
