= Kolbäck =

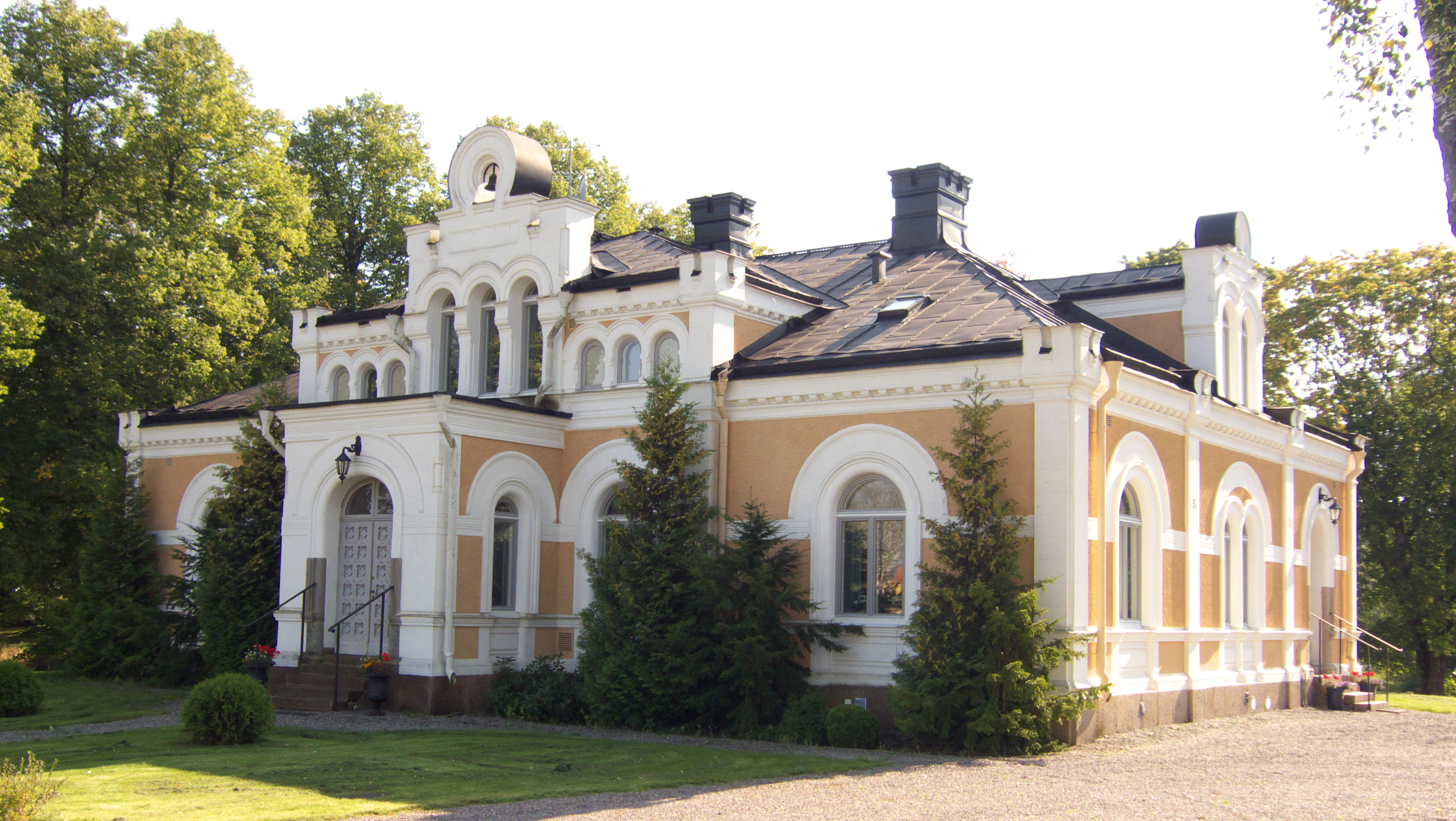
- Former court house in Kolbäck

- Location within Västmanland Location within Sweden
- Coordinates: 59°34′N 16°15′E
- Country: Sweden
- Province: Västmanland
- County: Västmanland County
- Municipality: Hallstahammar Municipality

Area
  - Total: 2.22 km^{2} (0.86 sq mi)

Population (31 December 2010)
  - Total: 1,951
  - Density: 880/km^{2} (2,300/sq mi)
- Time zone: UTC+1 (CET)
  - Summer (DST): UTC+2 (CEST)

Kolbäck is a locality situated in Hallstahammar Municipality, Västmanland County, Sweden with 1,951 inhabitants in 2010. The Kolbäcks VK volleyball club belongs here.
