= Hylte/Halmstad VBK =

Volleyball club in Hyltebruk, Sweden

- Full name: Hylte/Halmstad Volleybollklubb
- Short name: H/H Volley
- Founded: 1980
- Ground: Halmstad Arena, Halmstad, Sweden
- Captain: Nicholas Goodell
- League: Elitserien

Hylte/Halmstad VBK is a volleyball club in Halmstad, Sweden, established in 1980. The club won the Swedish men's national championship in 1995, 1996 2000, 2001, 2005, 2006, 2013 and 2018. The women's team won the Swedish national championship in 2014.

== Team roster ==
=== 2018/2019 ===
Head coach: (Sweden) Per-Erik Dahlqvist

No.	Name	Date of birth	Position
1	(Sweden) Fredrik Holgersson	February 17, 1995 (age 30)	setter
3	(United States) Nicholas Goodell	March 5, 1991 (age 34)	opposite
4	(Sweden) Johan Mårtensson	March 16, 1993 (age 32)	outside hitter
5	(Sweden) Victor Nielsen	June 1, 1997 (age 28)	setter
6	(Sweden) Hampus Cousin	January 26, 1990 (age 35)	outside hitter
7	(Sweden) (Poland) Bartosz Sulinski	April 28, 1997 (age 28)	middle blocker
8	(Sweden) Anton Tegenrot	October 21, 1988 (age 37)	libero
9	(England) Adam Bradbury	August 22, 1991 (age 34)	outside hitter
10	(Sweden) David Pettersson	January 21, 1994 (age 31)	middle blocker
11	(Sweden) Philip Pettersson	September 15, 1992 (age 33)	middle blocker
12	(Sweden) Rasmus Collin	February 2, 1993 (age 32)	libero
14	(Sweden) Stefan Andreasson	November 4, 1999 (age 25)	outside hitter
15	(Sweden) Arno Slipac	February 8, 1994 (age 31)	outside hitter
17	(Sweden) Anton Ribom	February 10, 1999 (age 26)	middle blocker
