= Jeffrey Jendryk =

American volleyball player (born 1995)

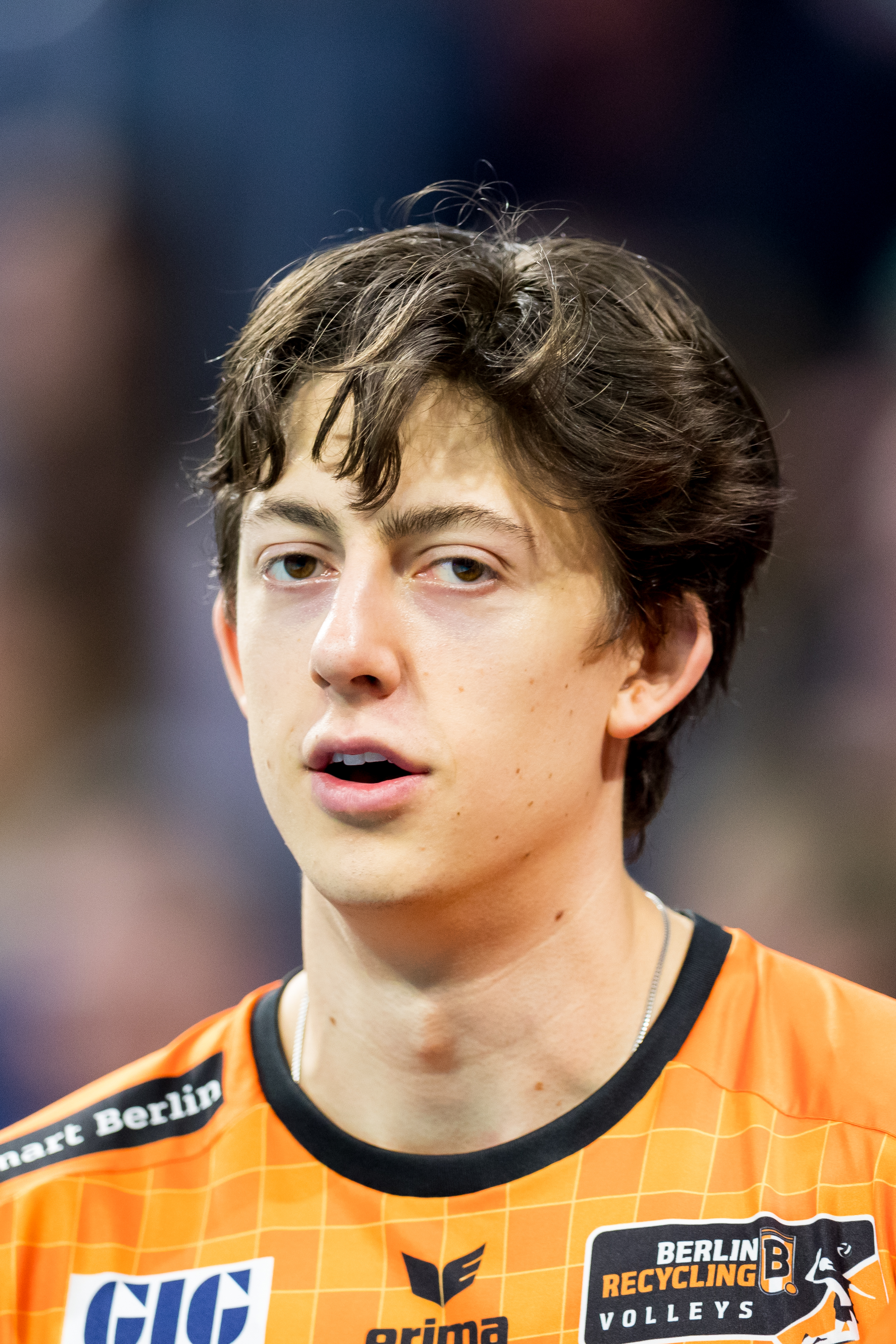
- Jendryk in 2020

Personal information
- Full name: Jeffrey Paul Jendryk II
- Nickname: Jeff
- Born: September 15, 1995 (age 31); Wheaton, Illinois, U.S.
- Height: 6 ft 9 in (2.05 m)
- Weight: 200 lb (90 kg)
- Spike: 145 in (368 cm)
- Education: Loyola University Chicago

Volleyball information
- Position: Middle blocker
- Current club: PAOK Thessaloniki

Career
Years	Teams
2015–2018; 2018–2020; 2020–2021; 2021–2022; 2022–2023; 2023–2025; 2025; 2025–	Loyola Ramblers; Berlin Recycling Volleys; Asseco Resovia; Berlin Recycling Volleys; LUK Lublin; Prisma Volley; Fenerbahçe; PAOK Thessaloniki

National team
2017–	United States
Medal record
Men's volleyball
Representing United States
Olympic Games
Bronze medal – third place	2024 Paris	Team
FIVB World Championship
Bronze medal – third place	2018 Italy/Bulgaria
FIVB World Cup
Gold medal – first place	2023 Japan
Bronze medal – third place	2019 Japan
FIVB Nations League
Silver medal – second place	2019 Chicago
Silver medal – second place	2022 Bologna
Silver medal – second place	2023 Gdańsk
Silver medal – second place	2026 Ningbo
Bronze medal – third place	2018 Lille
NORCECA Championship
Gold medal – first place	2023 Charleston
Silver medal – second place	2019 Winnipeg

Jeffrey Paul Jendryk II (/ˈdʒɛndʒrɪk/ JEN-drik; born September 15, 1995) is an American professional volleyball player who plays as a middle blocker for PAOK Thessaloniki and the U.S. national team.

== Career ==
Jendryk was a bronze medalist at the 2018 World Championship, 2019 World Cup, and the 2018 Nations League.

== Honors ==
=== College ===
- Domestic
  - 2015 NCAA national championship, with Loyola Ramblers

=== Club ===
- Domestic
  - 2018–19 German Championship, with Berlin Recycling Volleys
  - 2019–20 German SuperCup, with Berlin Recycling Volleys
  - 2019–20 German Cup, with Berlin Recycling Volleys
  - 2021–22 German SuperCup, with Berlin Recycling Volleys
  - 2021–22 German Championship, with Berlin Recycling Volleys
  - 2024–25 Turkish Cup, with Fenerbahçe

=== Youth national team ===
- 2015 U21 Pan American Cup

=== Individual awards ===
- 2015: NCAA national championship – All-tournament team (Most outstanding player)
- 2019: NORCECA Championship – Best middle blocker
