= Joseph J. Gentile Arena =

Multi-purpose arena in Chicago, Illinois

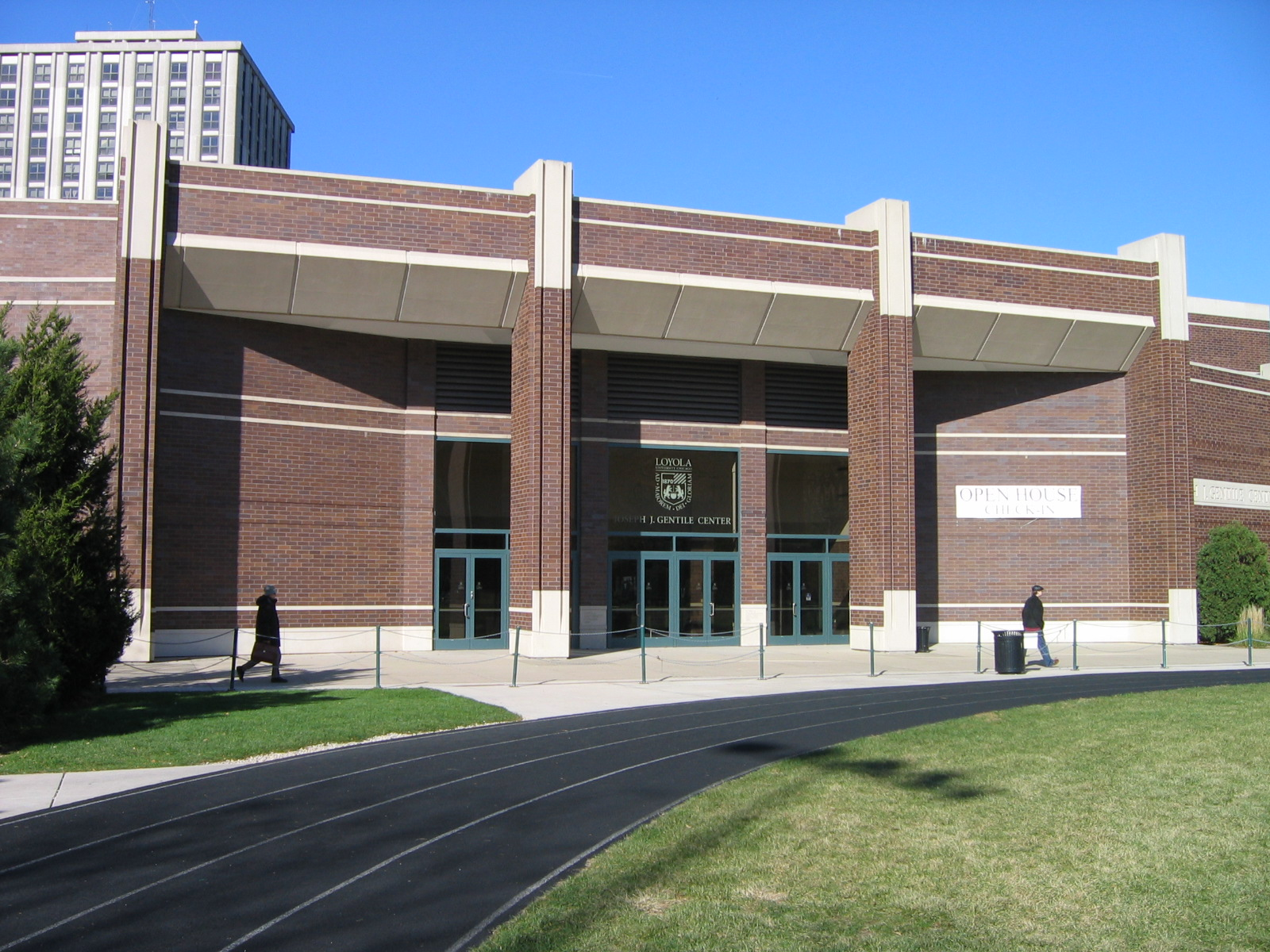
- Interactive map of Joseph J. Gentile Arena
- Former names: Joseph J. Gentile Center (1996–2011)
- Location: 6525 N Sheridan Rd, Chicago, IL 60626
- Coordinates: 42°0′2″N 87°39′32″W
- Owner: Loyola University Chicago
- Operator: Loyola University Chicago
- Capacity: 4,963
- Surface: Hardwood

Construction
- Opened: 1996
- Renovated: 2011
- Architect: Solomon, Cordwell, Buenz and Associates Inc.

Tenants
- Loyola Ramblers (NCAA); Men's basketball (1996–present); Women's basketball (1996–present); Men's volleyball (2012–present); Women's volleyball (2012–present)

Website
- loyolaramblers.com/sports/2017/5/25/facilities-loyc-gentile-html

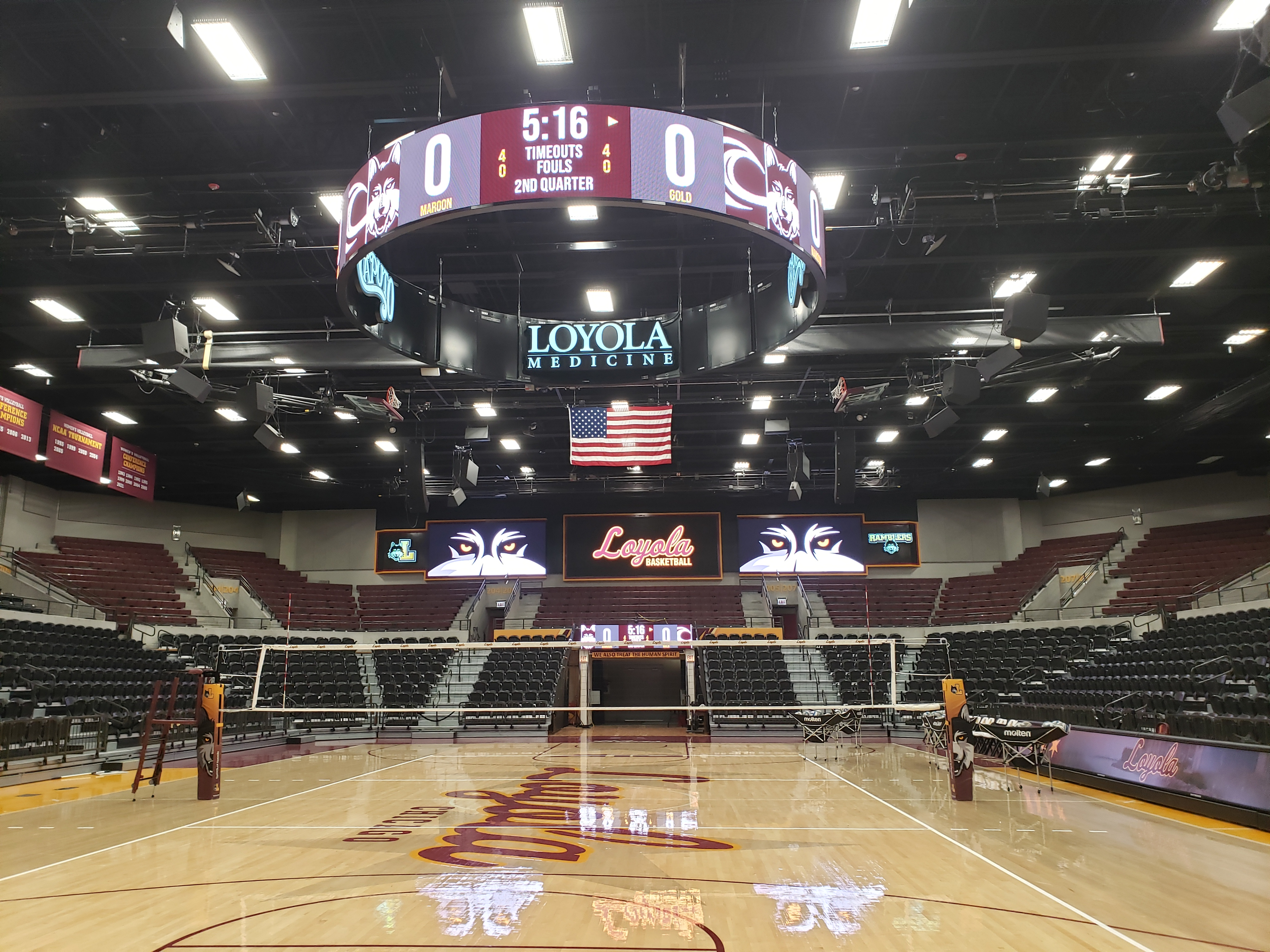
Gentile Arena in 2022

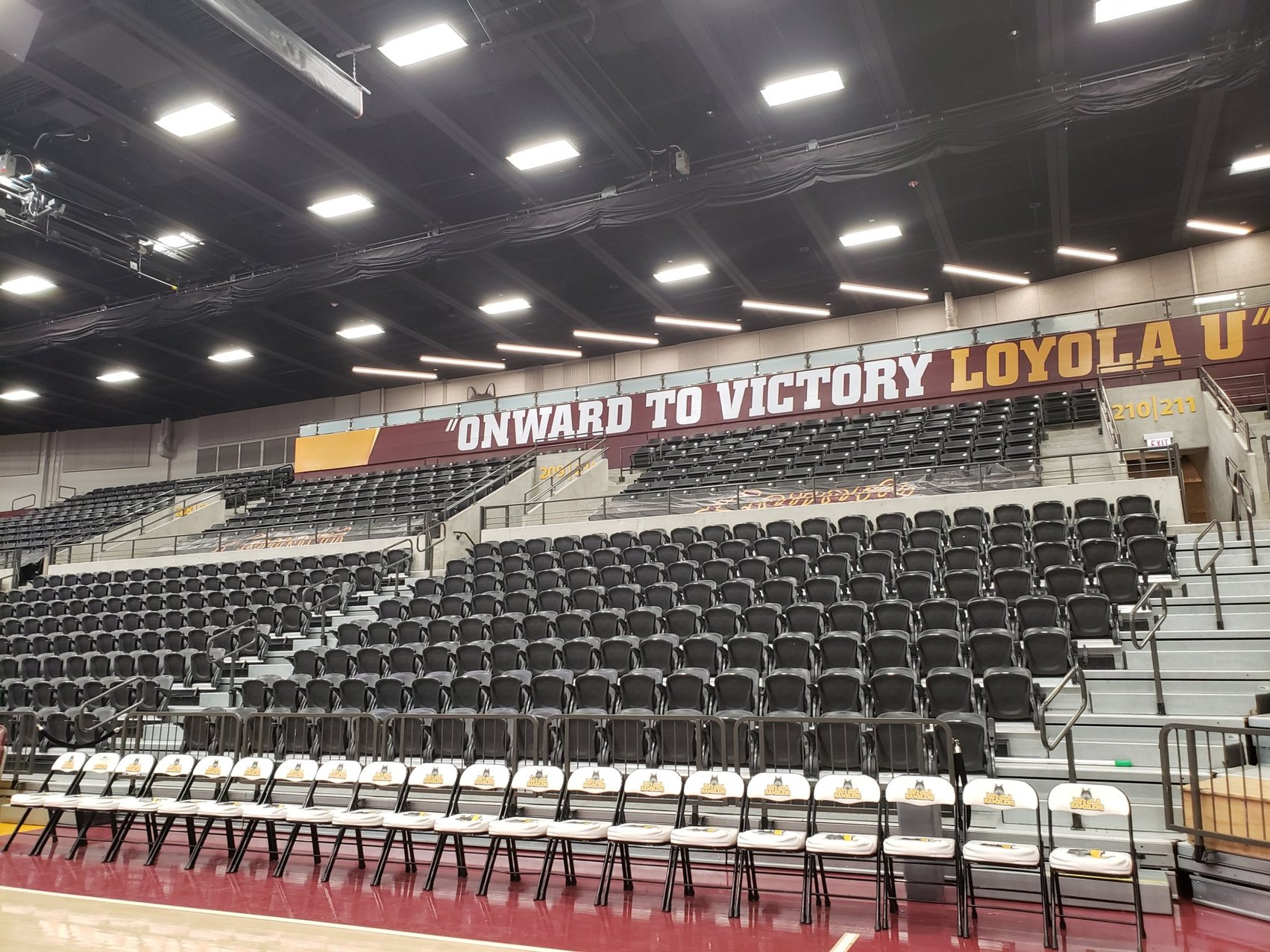
Gentile Arena fan seating

The Joseph J. Gentile Arena, formerly known as the Joseph J. Gentile Center or "The Joe", is a 4,486-seat multi-purpose arena on the campus of Loyola University in Chicago, Illinois. The arena opened in 1996. It is the home of the Loyola Ramblers men's and women's basketball programs. Renovations at the facility began in the summer of 2011.

On March 3, 2011, the $26 million Norville Center for Intercollegiate Athletics opened adjacent to the Gentile Arena. The Norville Center houses the university's athletic training facilities, locker rooms, as well as the offices of the athletic department that were formerly housed in Alumni Gym.

The Gentile Center was the site of the 1999 Midwestern Collegiate Conference women's volleyball tournament and the 2014 NCAA men's volleyball tournament.

Joe Gentile was a Chicago area car dealer who donated money to the university for the arena.

== See also ==
- List of NCAA Division I basketball arenas
