= English Women's National Volleyball League =

English Women's Super League
- Current season, competition or edition: 2026-27 Women's Super League (Volleyball)
- Formerly: English Women's Volleyball League
- Sport: Volleyball
- Founded: 1977
- First season: 1977/78
- Administrator: Volleyball England
- No. of teams: 8 (2026–27)
- Country: England
- Continent: Europe
- Most recent champion: Durham Palatinates
- Most titles: Mallory Eagles UEL
- Level on pyramid: 1
- Relegation to: Women's NVL Division 1
- Domestic cups: National Cup; National Shield
- International cups: CEV Champions League; CEV Cup; CEV Challenge Cup
- Website: http://www.volleyballengland.org/

The English Women's Super League is the major volleyball national competition for women in England, established in 1977. It is the highest league organised by the Volleyball England as part of the National Volleyball League(NVL) pyramid.

As of 2026, London Malory Eagles have won the competition the most times having won the league eight times, with their most recent win being the 2024-25 season. The current champions are Durham Palatinates, previously known as Team Durham, having beat Essex Rebels 3-1 in the "Final 4" playoff final.

== Competition formula ==
Eight teams compete in the league which is held in two stages: regular season and "Final 4". In the regular season, each team plays each other twice, once home and once away, in a round robin format. For a victory the teams earn 3 points with the score 3:0 or 3:1, 3:2 – 2 points, for a defeat with the score 2:3 – 1 point, 0:3 or 1:3 – 0 points.

At the end of the regular season, the top 4 ranked teams go into the playoffs known as the "Final 4". This is played at a neutral venue chosen by Volleyball England where the 1st ranked team plays the 4th and the 2nd ranked team plays the 3rd to determine which teams goes into the final. The final is then played the following day determining the Super League Champions, while the losers of the playoff semifinals play each other to determine the bronze medal winners of the season.

In addition, to the "Final 4" a relegation playoff is played between the 7th ranked team and the loser of the NVL Division 1 promotion playoffs. The losing team plays in Division 1 the next season. The 8th ranked team after the regular season is automatically relegated to Division 1.

== Winners list ==
Years	Champions	Runners-up	Third place
1978	Kirkby	Prescot	
1979	Hillingdon	Speedwell	
1980	TSB Kirkby	Hillingdon	
1981	competition not disputed		
1982	Hillingdon	Spark	
1983	Hillingdon	Spark	
1984	Hillingdon	Spark	
1985	Hillingdon	Ashcombe	
1986	Spark	Ashcombe	
1987	Sale	Ashcombe	
1988	Ashcombe	Sale	
1989	Britannia	Brixton Knights	
1990	Brixton Knights	Britannia	
1991	Mizuno Britannia	Woolwich Brixton Knights	
1992	Woolwich Brixton	Britannia Music	
1993	Woolwich Brixton	Sale	
1994	Woolwich Brixton	Sale	
1995	London Malory Eagles	Britannia Music City	
1996	London QKX	Team Knights	
1997	Britannia Music City	Manchester United Salford	
1998	London Malory Eagles	Manchester United Salford	
1999	London Malory Eagles	London QKX	
2000	Ashcombe Dorking1	Loughborough Students	
2001	Ashcombe Dorking1	London Malory Eagles	
2002	London Malory Eagles	Ashcombe Dorking	
2003	London Malory Eagles	Ashcombe Dorking	
2004	London Malory Eagles	Ashcombe Dorking	
2005	London Malory Eagles	Wolverhampton	Polonia IMKA London
2006	Wolverhampton	London Malory Eagles	Polonia IMKA London
2007	London Malory Eagles	Polonia IMKA London	University of Birmingham 1
2008	Wessex	University of Birmingham 1	Coventry & Warwick Riga 1
2009	Swiss Cottage	Coventry & Warwick Riga 1	London Malory Eagles
2010	Tameside VC	Polonia IMKA London	Swiss Cottage
2011	Polonia IMKA London	Swiss Cottage	London Malory Eagles
2012	Team Northumbria	Leeds Carnegie	London Malory Eagles
2013	Team Northumbria	Polonia SideOut London	Wessex W1
2014	Team Northumbria	Polonia SideOut London	Wessex W1
2015	Team Northumbria	Polonia SideOut London	City of Salford VC
2016	Team Northumbria	Polonia SideOut London	
2017	Team Durham	Team Northumbria	
2018	Team Durham	Team Northumbria	
2019	Tendring VC Ladies	Durham Palatinates	London Orcas
2020	Suspended		
2021	Polonia SideOut London	Durham Palatinates	
2022	Durham Palatinates	Polonia SideOut London	
2023	Durham Palatinates	Team Polonia SideOut (London)	
2024	Durham Palatinates	Team Polonia SideOut (London)	Mallory Eagles UEL
2025	Mallory Eagles UEL	Essex Rebels	Team Polonia SideOut (London)
2026	Durham Palatinates	Essex Rebels	Newcastle Knights
