= English National Volleyball League =

Professional volleyball league

English Men's Super League
- Current season, competition or edition: 2026–27 Men's Super League
- Formerly: English Men's Volleyball League
- Sport: Volleyball
- Founded: 1977
- First season: 1977–78
- CEO: Charlie Ford
- Administrator: Volleyball England
- No. of teams: 8 (2026–27)
- Country: England
- Continent: Europe
- Most recent champion: London Giants Volleyball
- Most titles: Malory Eagles
- Qualification: Promotion from Division 1
- Level on pyramid: 1
- Relegation to: NVL Division 1
- Domestic cups: England Cup; England Super Cup
- International cups: CEV Champions League; CEV Cup; CEV Challenge Cup
- Website: volleyballengland.org

The English Men's Super League is the major volleyball national competition for men in England, established in 1977. It is the highest league organised by Volleyball England as part of the National Volleyball League(NVL) pyramid.

== Competition format ==
Eight teams compete in the league which is held in two stages: regular season and "Final 4". In the regular season, each team plays each other twice, once home and once away, in a round robin format. For a victory the teams earn 3 points with the score 3:0 or 3:1, 3:2 – 2 points, for a defeat with the score 2:3 – 1 point, 0:3 or 1:3 – 0 points.

At the end of the regular season, the top 4 ranked teams go into the playoffs known as the "Final 4". This is played at a neutral venue chosen by Volleyball England where the 1st ranked team plays the 4th and the 2nd ranked team plays the 3rd to determine which teams goes into the final. The final is then played the following day determining the Super League Champions, while the losers of the playoff semifinals play each other to determine the bronze medal winners of the season.

In addition, to the "Final 4" a relegation playoff is played between the 7th ranked team and the loser of the NVL Division 1 promotion playoffs. The losing team plays in Division 1 the next season. The 8th ranked team after the regular season is automatically relegated to Division 1.

The 2025–26 DYNAMIK Men's Super League season in England featured eight teams competing at the highest level of domestic volleyball. The season culminated in the Final Four weekend held at the Crystal Palace National Sports Centre on 11-12 April 2026. The top four teams — London Giants, Newcastle Knights, Malory Eagles and University of Nottingham — competed for the championship title. London Giants retained the championship title, winning back-to-back Men's Super League championships. Newcastle Knights finished as silver medallists, while Malory Eagles secured the bronze medal. In the 2025-26 relegation playoff, 6th ranked Leeds Gorse played against 7th ranked Richmond Docklands, in which Richmond won 3-0 to stay in the Super League for the next season.

== Winners list ==
Years	Champions	Runners-up	Third place
1978	Sefton A	Blokk 75 & Deeside	
1979	Kestrels	Speedwell	
1980	Speedwell Furness	Kelly Girl International	
1981	Competition Not Disputed		
1982	Speedwell Rucanor	Kelly Girl International	
1983	Speedwell Rucanor	Kelly Girl International	
1984	Capital City Spikers	Polonia London	
1985	Team Mizuno	Speedwell Rucanor	
1986	Polonia London	Speedwell Rucanor	
1987	Speedwell Rucanor	Polonia London	
1988	Malory CLC	Liverpool City	
1989	Malory CLC	Star Aquila	
1990	Team Mizuno Malory	Speedwell Rucanor	
1991	Team Mizuno Malory	Polonia Ealing	
1992	Team Mizuno Malory	Reebok Liverpool	
1993	Mizuno Lewisham	KLEA Leeds	
1994	Mizuno Malory Lewisham	Polonia Ealing	
1995	Mizuno Malory Lewisham	Newcastle Staffs	
1996	Mizuno Malory Lewisham	Newcastle Staffs	
1997	Malory Lewisham	Tooting Aquila	
1998	Tooting Aquila	Malory Lewisham	
1999	Malory London	City of Stoke	
2000	Malory London	Wessex 1	
2001	Malory London	Portsmouth Mayfield1	
2002	Malory London	London Docklands	
2003	London Malory	London Docklands	
2004	London Malory	Warwick Riga	London Docklands
2005	London Malory	London Docklands	Sheffield VC
2006	London Malory	London Docklands	City of Bristol 1
2007	London Docklands	London Malory	Polonia London
2008	London Malory	Sheffield Volleyball Club	Coventry & Warwick Riga
2009	Sheffield VC	Coventry & Warwick Riga	Malory Eagles London
2010	Malory Eagles London	Sheffield VC	London Docklands
2011	Polonia London	Leeds Carnegie	Sheffield VC
2012	Leeds Carnegie	Polonia London	Team Northumbria
2013	Polonia London	Team Northumbria	
2014	Sheffield VC	Team Northumbria	
2015	Team Northumbria	Sheffield VC	
2016	Polonia London	Team Northumbria	
2017	Polonia London	Sheffield VC	
2018	Team Northumbria	Polonia London	Sheffield VC
2019	Polonia London	Durham University	Wessex VC
2020	Suspended		
2022	Durham Palatinates	Malory Eagles UEL	Richmond Docklands
2023	Durham Palatinates	Malory Eagles UEL	Polonia London
2024	Durham Palatinates	Polonia London	Essex Rebels
2025	London Giants	Essex Rebels	Malory Eagles
2026	London Giants	Newcastle Knights	Malory Eagles
