= Falkenbergs VBK =

Swedish volleyball club

- Full name: Falkenbergs volleybollklubb
- Short name: FVBK
- Founded: 1985
- Ground: Falkhallen, Falkenberg, Sweden

Falkenbergs VBK is a Swedish volleyball club, formed in 1985 by a merger of Ätradalens VK and Köinge JUF. It has played in the highest league (Elitserien) since 2002. It won the league for the first time in 2007. The club reached the final of the Swedish national championship in 2006 and won the national championship for the first time in 2007 before winning again in 2008, 2009., 2011, 2014. and 2016.
