= Kettering Leisure Village =

Sports and conference centre in Kettering, Northamptonshire

Coordinates: 52°23′14.78″N 0°44′8.36″W

The Kettering Leisure Village is a multi-functional sports and conference centre located in Kettering, Northamptonshire.

== History ==
The Kettering Leisure Village is a part-government, part council, part privately funded multi-functional business, sports and arts venue and facility, run and managed by Balance Health Clubs on behalf of itself and Kettering Borough Council.

It was the location of Volleyball England's National Volleyball Centre until 2023.Made possible with a grants from Kettering Borough Council, Northamptonshire Enterprise Ltd, the East Midlands Development Agency and the Kettering Conference Centre, the long term agreement came into place in November 2010 and finished in 2023.

As such, parts of the centre are privately operated, and parts are funded or subsidised by the council.

== Conference facilities ==
The conference venue can accommodate meetings from 5 to 1,500 attendees in fully serviced rooms, supplied by associated catering facilities, plus a lakeside terrace and bar.

A licensed civil wedding facility, the wedding and reception venue can accommodate up to 200 people.

== Arena Sports ==
The Arena Sports and Leisure Centre is a council-funded sports facility for local people, run and operated by Balance Health Clubs. It provides:

- 12 badminton courts
- 4 glass-backed squash courts
- Dance/martial arts studio
- 3 syndicate or meeting rooms

=== Tigers Soft Play ===
An integrated 15,000 square feet (1,400 m^{2}) children's activity centre, with activities across four levels that include: rides, slides.

== National Volleyball Centre ==
Made possible with a grants from Kettering Borough Council, Northamptonshire Enterprise Ltd, the East Midlands Development Agency and the Kettering Conference Centre, the four-year agreement came into place in November 2010.

The 2,000 square metres (22,000 sq ft) facility houses both National Volleyball Centre - as well as home of Volleyball England's national men's, women's, junior men's and women's, as well as cadet boys' and girls' volleyball squads, and several national competitions.

== Lighthouse Theatre ==
The Lighthouse Theatre is a £2 million extension to the existing facility, with a £250,000 subsidy from Kettering's Council Tax payers.

The theatre provides a 562-tiered-seat auditorium and balcony (400 tiered seats at ground-floor level; 138 tiered in the balcony; six private boxes each with four seats and a fridge), complemented by modern lighting and sound equipment. With a larger than normal designed stage, the theatre was designed as a flexible space for use either as a theatre or to accommodate conferences, presentations, award ceremonies and product launches.

The Lighthouse Theatre opened on 6 March 2008.

== Transport ==
Situated alongside the A14 road at Junction 8, which links the A1, M1 and M6, the centre has over 600 car parking places.

Rail services operated by East Midlands Railway depart every 30 minutes from Kettering to St Pancras International railway station, with an average journey time on the Midland Main Line of 59 minutes. St Pancras also provides an interchange with the Eurostar service to France and Belgium. Kettering is linked to Corby, Leicester, Nottingham, Derby and Sheffield to the north and Wellingborough, Bedford, Luton to the south.
