= Bosöns IK =

Sports club in Bosön, Sweden

- Full name: Bosöns idrottsklubb
- Sport: Volleyball
- Based in: Bosön, Sweden

Bosöns IK was a sports club in Bosön, Sweden. The club won the Swedish women's national volleyball championship in 1962, 1963, 1964, 1966 and 1967.
