= Alingsås VBK =

Volleyball club in Alingsås, Sweden

- Full name: Alingsås volleybollklubb
- Short name: AVBK
- Founded: 1 June 1961
- Ground: Nolhagahallen, Alingsås, Sweden

Alingsås VBK is a volleyball club in Alingsås, Sweden. Established on 1 June 1961, it joined the Swedish Volleyball Federation on 19 December the same year. The club won the Swedish women's national championship in 1971.
