= Kolbäcks VK =

Swedish volleyball club

- Short name: KVK
- Founded: 1948
- Ground: Hallstahammars sporthall, Hallstahammar, Sweden

Kolbäcks VK is a volleyball club in Kolbäck, Sweden, established in 1948.

The club won the Swedish men's national volleyball championship in 1962, 1963 and 1965, and the Swedish women's national volleyball championship in 1969. The club also won the Swedish men's junior national volleyball championship in 1974 and the Swedish women's junior national volleyball championship in 1985 and 2003.
