= London Malory =

English volleyball club

London Malory is a prominent English volleyball club, competing in the National Super League for both men and women.

Like many National Volleyball League clubs, London Malory do not train out-of-season (April/May - September). Many of their players though, take part in the many beach and grass volleyball events held during this period each year.

In June 2009 London Malory announced their merger with the South London club of 30 years, White Eagles, becoming "Malory Eagles". The former head coach of London Malory, Jefferson Williams, became the new head coach of Malory Eagles Volleyball Club (the merged club's chosen name). The former chair of White Eagles Volleyball Club, David Jenkinson, also reassumed his position under the new partnership.
