= Lindesbergs VBK =

Swedish volleyball club

- Full name: Lindesbergs volleybollklubb
- Short name: LVBK
- Founded: 1971
- Ground: Lindesberg Arena, Lindesberg, Sweden

Lindesbergs VBK is a volleyball club in Lindesberg, Sweden, established in 1971. The club won the Swedish women's national championship in 2012
