= Värnamo FK =

Swedish sports club

- Full name: Värnamo frisksportklubb
- Sport: volleyball
- Based in: Värnamo, Sweden

Värnamo FK is a sports club in Värnamo, Sweden. The club won the Swedish women's national volleyball championship in 1970, 1972, 1973 and 1974.
