= Joseph Worsley =

American volleyball player (born 1997)

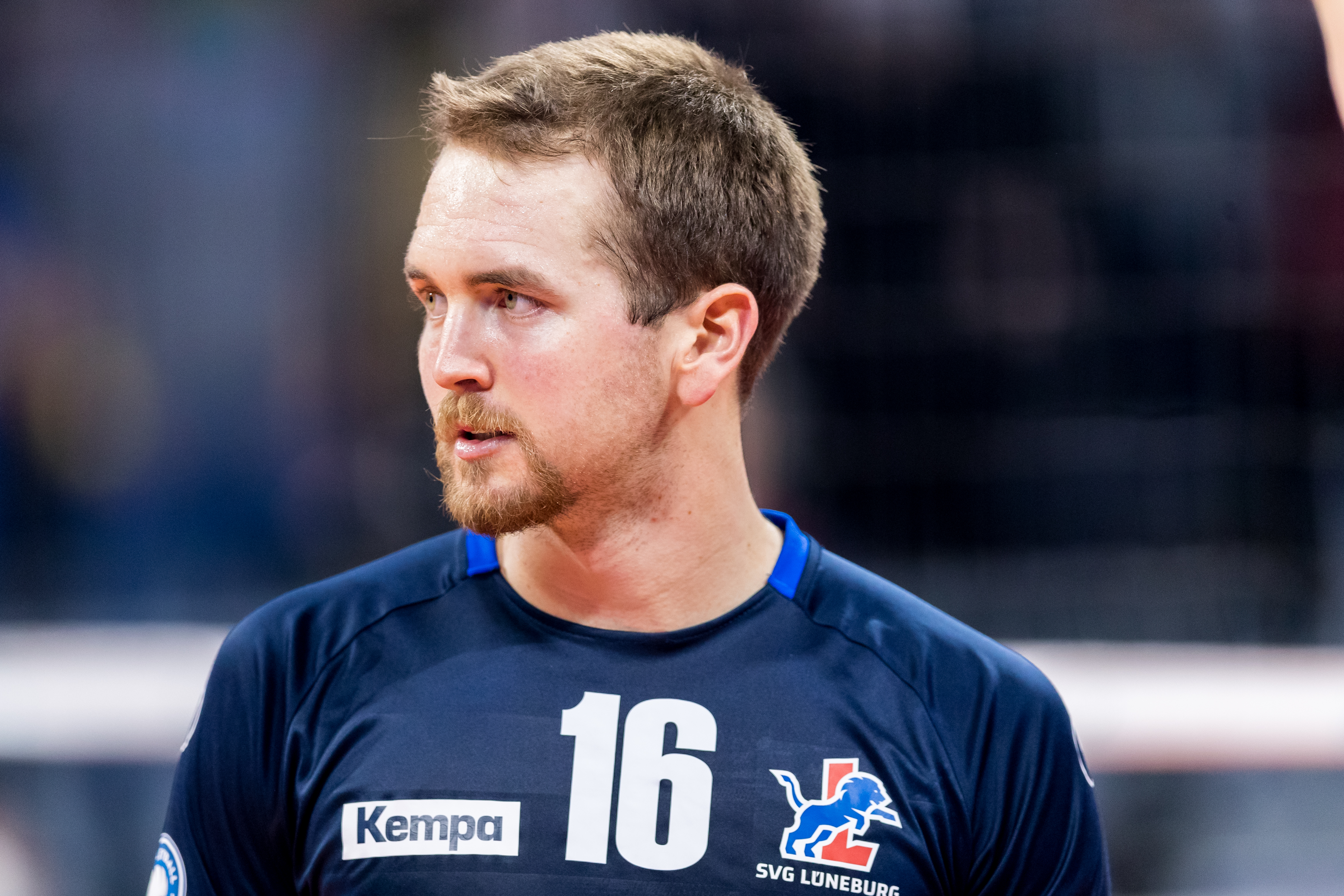

Personal information
- Nationality: American
- Born: June 16, 1997 (age 29); Moraga, California, U.S.
- Height: 6 ft 1 in (1.85 m)
- Education: University of Hawaii at Manoa

Volleyball information
- Position: Setter
- Current club: (Germany) SVG Lüneburg
- Number: 1

Career
Years	Teams
2016-2019; 2019-2021	(United States) University of Hawaii at Manoa (Germany) VfB Friedrichshafen

Joseph Worsley (born June 16, 1997) is an American volleyball player, a member of the German club SVG Lüneburg, a silver medalist of the 2019 NORCECA Championship.

His younger brother Gage, also a volleyball player, plays the libero position.

== Sporting achievements ==
Big West Conference:

- 2018, 2019

NCAA men's tournament:

- 2019

=== National team ===
Boys' Youth NORCECA Championship:

- 2014

Men's Junior NORCECA Championship:

- 2016

NORCECA Championship:

- 2019
