= Adam Bradbury =

English volleyball player (born 1991)

Personal information
- Nationality: English
- Born: 22 August 1991 (age 35); Stoke-on-Trent, England
- Height: 6 ft 3 in (1.90 m)

Volleyball information
- Position: Outside spiker
- Current club: (Sweden) Hylte VBK
- Number: 9

Career
Years	Teams
2015–2017; 2017–2018; 2018–	(Sweden) Vingåkers VK (England) Team Northumbria (Sweden) Hylte VBK

Adam Bradbury (born 22 August 1991) is an English volleyball player, a member of the club Hylte VBK.

== Sporting achievements ==
=== Clubs ===
English Cup:

- 2018

English Championship:

- 2018

Swedish Championship:

- 2019
