= Polonia London =

Volleyball team from London, England

- Full name: Polonia London Volleyball Club
- Nickname: IBB Polonia London (male); Polonia SideOut London (female)
- Founded: 1973 (male); 1980 (female)
- Ground: Brentford Fountain Leisure Centre, London
- League: Volleyball England Super League

Polonia London VC is a professional volleyball team based in London, England. The club plays in the Super League, highest level of the English Volleyball League. The male section of the club is named IBB Polonia London (since 2013), the female section is named Polonia SideOut London.

== Achievements ==
=== Men's ===
- English Championship
  (x7) 1986, 2011, 2013, 2016, 2017, 2019, 2020
  (x6) 1984, 1987, 1991, 1994, 2012, 2018
  (x1) 2007
- English Cup
  (x2) 2016, 2017
- NEVZA Championship
  (x1) 2019

=== Women's ===
- English Championship
  (x1) 2011
  (x6) 2010, 2012, 2013, 2014, 2015, 2016
- English Cup
  (x3) 2010, 2011, 2016
- NEVZA Championship
  (x1) 2020

== History ==
The club was set up in 1973 by Maciej Behnke and Henryk Pauliński, members of the Polish YMCA. The female section of the club was founded by sisters Bożena and Grażyna Zajączkowska in 1980. Both sections, male and female, compete in the highest level of the English National Volleyball League, the National Super League.

In 2013, IBB Polonia London established a partnership with one of the most successful clubs in Poland, PGE Skra Bełchatów, with the aim of popularising volleyball in the UK, promoting both clubs and exchanging experience in the field of training.

In March 2017, ex–Polish national team player, libero - Krzysztof Ignaczak, came out of retirement to join the club for the remainder of the 2016–17 season. As a then current World Champion, his presence at the club helped raise the profile of volleyball in Great Britain and in the world.

== Teams ==
- Men's volleyball

Team roster - season 2017/2018
IBB Polonia London
No.	Name	Date of birth	Position
1	(Poland) Damian Bykowski	4 November 1998	Opposite
2	(Poland) Adrian Machowicz	19 April 1996	Setter
4	(Poland) Dorian Poinc	23 May 1990	Outside hitter
5	(Latvia) Gvido Petersons	25 February 1997	Outside hitter
6	(United Kingdom) Philip Smith	24 January 1986	Outside hitter
7	(United Kingdom) Robert Nicholson	19 January 1990	Middle blocker
8	(Poland) Tomasz Wysocki	30 June 1987	Middle blocker
9	(Russia) Konstantin Khramtcov	29 October 1991	Setter
10	(France) Nicolas Bigot	28 April 1997	Outside hitter
11	(Slovakia) Marcel Sivak	18 September 1982	Libero
12	(United States) Derek Guimond	16 September 1992	Middle blocker
14	(United States) Brendan Chang	8 May 1994	Libero
16	(Poland) Michał Bartoszak	24 August 1993	Opposite
17	(United Kingdom) Connor Boyle	30 July 1993	Middle blocker
18	(Brazil) Vitor de Oliveira Wanderley	11 January 1994	Middle blocker
Head coach: Piotr Graban; Assistant: Patrik Selep

Team roster - season 2016/2017
IBB Polonia London
No.	Name	Date of birth	Position
1	(Poland) Leszek Giedroyc		outside hitter
2	(France) Olivier Raynaud	23 August 1989	outside hitter
3	(United Kingdom) Michał Saller	11 November 1976	libero
5	(Greece) Odysseus Adam	18 February 1997	setter
7	(United Kingdom) Robert Nicholson	19 January 1990	middle blocker
8	(United Kingdom) Tomasz Lasocki	30 March 1987	universal
9	(France) Christo Todorov	21 April 1988	setter
10	(Bulgaria) Mihail Stoev	25 September 1990	outside hitter
11	(Brazil) Fernando Marques	21 November 1994	libero
12	(United States) Derek Guimond	16 September 1992	middle blocker
13	(Poland) Bartosz Kisielewicz	20 November 1986	setter
14	(Slovakia) Roman Mizerak	22 September 1987	outside hitter
15	(Poland) Igor Drej	5 December 1990	libero
16	(Poland) Michał Bartoszak	24 August 1993	middle blocker
17	(Romania) Marius Ciortea	12 October 1983	opposite
18	(Brazil) Vitor de Oliveira Wanderley	11 January 1994	middle blocker
	(Poland) Krzysztof Ignaczak	15 May 1978	
Head coach: Piotr Graban; Assistant: Patrik Selep
