= Victor Nielsen =

Australian rules footballer (1883–1962)

Victor Nielson

Personal information
- Full name: Victor Rasmus Nielsen
- Born: 25 January 1883; South Melbourne, Victoria
- Died: 27 October 1962 (aged 79); Springvale, Victoria

Playing career^{1}
Years	Club	Games (Goals)
1907	Melbourne	8 (1)
- ^{1} Playing statistics correct to the end of 1907.

Victor Rasmus Nielsen (25 January 1883 – 27 October 1962) was an Australian rules footballer who played with Melbourne in the Victorian Football League (VFL).
