= Lighthouse Theatre (Warrnambool) =

Theatre in Warrnambool, Victoria

Lighthouse Theatre is the main theatre in Warrnambool in the State of Victoria, Australia.

Lighthouse Theatre is southwest Victoria's leading creative hub for Performing Arts and Culture.

It has programs that include Theatre, Dance, Music, Comedy, Cabaret and the unexpected; it aims to bring together audiences and artists to experience, to create and to celebrate.
