= Katrineholms VK =

Swedish volleyball club

- Full name: Katrineholms volleybollklubb
- Short name: KVK
- Founded: 30 March 1977
- Ground: Duveholmshallen, Katrineholm, Sweden

Katrineholms VK is a volleyball club in Katrineholm, Sweden, established on 30 March 1977 as a breakout out of KFUM Katrineholm's volleyball section. The club won the Swedish women's national championship in 2010, 2011 and 2013
