= Volleyball England =

Sports governing body in England

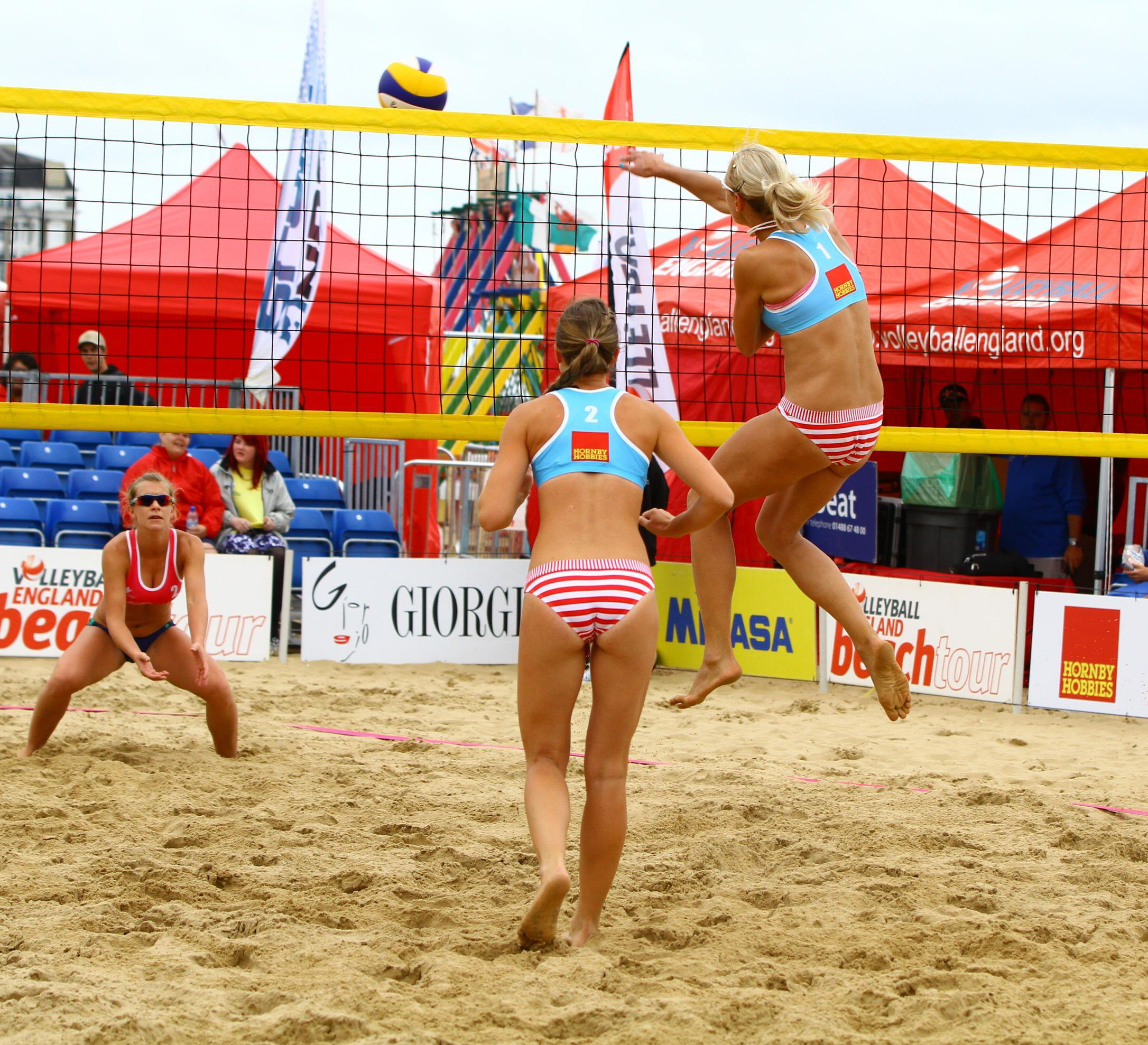
Margate Masters tournament of the Volleyball England Beach Tour.

Volleyball England is the national governing body for indoor volleyball, sitting volleyball and beach volleyball in England. It selects the national teams and coordinates several national competitions, including the National Volleyball League, National Cup, Student Cup and Sitting Volleyball competitions. For beach volleyball it partners with the UK Beach Tour (UKBT) to deliver tournaments across the UK and a national ranking system for players.

Volleyball England also coordinates national junior development squads via the Volleyball England Talent Pathway, and organises the training and assessment of referees and coaches. It is a member body of the FIVB and has its offices at SportPark, Loughborough University, Loughborough, Leicestershire. Volleyball England works closely with, and is supported by, the Volleyball England Foundation, which is a charity providing financial support to volleyball development projects. It also partners with the governing bodies for volleyball from the other UK Home Nations to form the British Volleyball Federation.

Volleyball England is the trading name for the English Volleyball Association Limited, which was formed in 1972.

== National Volleyball Centre ==
With £3.5million of funding from both the UK Government and the UK National Lottery in the run-up to London 2012, in 2007 Volleyball England signed an agreement to accommodate the National Volleyball Centre within the Kettering Conference Centre. Made possible with a grant from Kettering Borough Council, Northamptonshire Enterprise Ltd, and the East Midlands Development Agency, the four-year agreement came into place on the opening of the centre in November 2010.

The 2,000 square metres (22,000 sq ft) facility houses both National Volleyball Centre, as well as home of Volleyball England's national men's and women's volleyball squads, and several national competitions.

== National Volleyball League ==
=== NVL organisation ===
The National Volleyball League (NVL) is an indoor volleyball league, split into men's and women's competitions, each with 4 levels. In season 2018–19, the top three levels are the same for men and women: National Super League, Division 1 and Division 2 (North & South). Men's Division 3 is divided into North, Central and South. Women's Division 3 is divided into North, Central, South-East and South-West.

The latest information on National Volleyball League participants and ranking can be found in the National Volleyball League Tables on the Volleyball England website The information below is a snapshot showing the numbers of teams in each division for the 2018–19 season, though this varies from year to year:

Division	Men's Teams	Women's Teams
National Super League	9	9
Division 1	9	10
Division 2 (North)	9	10
Division 2 (South)	9	10
Division 3 (North)	7	6
Division 3 (Central)	7	9
Division 3 (South)	9	-
Division 3 (South-West)	-	9
Division 3 (South-East)	-	8

=== NVL History ===
In the past, men's volleyball in England has been dominated by London Malory, led by Canadian coach Jefferson Williams. In recent years, IBB Polonia London have been the most successful team winning 3 of the last 4 editions.

Women's volleyball in England has also been dominated by London Malory in the past, again led by Jefferson Williams. However, in 2008, the University of London Union (ULU) women's team defeated London Malory in the Cup quarter-finals and left them out of the Final for the first time in 13 years. The student side, which competes in the London Premier League and is led by coach Mark Kontopoulos, then defeated Wessex-Team Bath in the semi-finals and London Polonia in the Final to become the first ever non-national league team to win the National Cup. In recent years, women's volleyball has been dominated by northern sides with Team Northumbria winning the title five times in a row from 2012 to 2016, followed by Team Durham's two consecutive titles in 2017 and 2018. In 2019, Tendring VC Ladies won their first National league championship to bring the trophy to Essex.
