= 2018–19 Italian Women's Volleyball League =

2018–19 Italian Women's Serie A1
- League: Italian Women's Volleyball League
- Sport: Volleyball
- Duration: 27 October 2018 – 6 May 2019
- Teams: 13

Regular Season
- Season champions: Imoco Volley Conegliano
- Top scorer: Paola Egonu

Finals
- Champions: Imoco Volley Conegliano
- Runners-up: Igor Gorgonzola Novara
- Finals MVP: Monica De Gennaro

Italian Women's Volleyball League seasons
- ← 2017–18 2019–20 →

The 2018–19 Serie A1 was the 74th season of the highest professional Italian Women's Volleyball League. The season took place from October to May and was contested by thirteen teams.

== Format ==
The regular season consists of 26 rounds, where the thirteen participating teams play each other twice (once home and once away). At the completion of the regular season, the eight best teams advance to the championship playoffs and the team finishing 13th is relegated to Serie A2. If the 13th team is Club Italia Crai, the team finishing 12th is relegated.

The standings criteria:

- highest number of result points (points awarded for results: 3 points for 3–0 or 3–1 wins, 2 points for 3–2 win, 1 point for 2–3 loss);
- highest number of matches won;
- highest set quotient (the number of total sets won divided by the number of total sets lost);
- highest points quotient (the number of total points scored divided by the number of total points conceded).

== Teams ==
| Club | Venue | Capacity | City/Area | Club locations in Italy (2018–19 season). |
| Banca Valsabbina Millenium Brescia | PalaGeorge | 4,300 | Montichiari | Club locations in Italy (2018–19 season). |
| Bosca San Bernardo Cuneo | PalaCastagnaretta | 4,700 | Cuneo | Club locations in Italy (2018–19 season). |
| Club Italia Crai | Centro Pavesi | 1,000 | Milan | Club locations in Italy (2018–19 season). |
| èpiù Pomì Casalmaggiore | PalaRadi | 3,519 | Cremona | Club locations in Italy (2018–19 season). |
| Igor Gorgonzola Novara | Pala Igor Gorgonzola | 4,000 | Novara | Club locations in Italy (2018–19 season). |
| Il Bisonte Firenze | Nelson Mandela Forum | 7,500 | Florence | Club locations in Italy (2018–19 season). |
| Imoco Volley Conegliano | PalaVerde | 5,344 | Villorba | Club locations in Italy (2018–19 season). |
| Lardini Filottrano | PalaBaldinelli | 3,500 | Osimo | Club locations in Italy (2018–19 season). |
| Reale Mutua Fenera Chieri | PalaFenera | 1,506 | Chieri | Club locations in Italy (2018–19 season). |
| Saugella Team Monza | Opiquad Arena | 4,500 | Monza | Club locations in Italy (2018–19 season). |
| Savino Del Bene Scandicci | Palazzetto dello Sport | 2,000 | Scandicci | Club locations in Italy (2018–19 season). |
| Unet E-Work Busto Arsizio | E-Work Arena | 4,490 | Busto Arsizio | Club locations in Italy (2018–19 season). |
| Zanetti Bergamo | PalaIntred | 2,600 | Bergamo | Club locations in Italy (2018–19 season). |

== Regular season ==
=== League table ===
| Pos | Team | Pld | W | L | Pts | SW | SL | SR | SPW | SPL | SPR | Qualification or relegation |
|---|---|---|---|---|---|---|---|---|---|---|---|---|
| 1 | Imoco Volley Conegliano | 24 | 20 | 4 | 61 | 66 | 18 | 3.667 | 2034 | 1720 | 1.183 | Championship playoffs |
| 2 | Igor Gorgonzola Novara | 24 | 17 | 7 | 52 | 61 | 31 | 1.968 | 2107 | 1859 | 1.133 | Championship playoffs |
| 3 | Savino Del Bene Scandicci | 24 | 18 | 6 | 50 | 57 | 32 | 1.781 | 2045 | 1824 | 1.121 | Championship playoffs |
| 4 | Saugella Team Monza | 24 | 16 | 8 | 48 | 57 | 38 | 1.500 | 2168 | 2053 | 1.056 | Championship playoffs |
| 5 | Unet E-Work Busto Arsizio | 24 | 15 | 9 | 45 | 52 | 37 | 1.405 | 2066 | 1920 | 1.076 | Championship playoffs |
| 6 | èpiù Pomì Casalmaggiore | 24 | 15 | 9 | 43 | 50 | 40 | 1.250 | 1995 | 1968 | 1.014 | Championship playoffs |
| 7 | Il Bisonte Firenze | 24 | 12 | 12 | 39 | 50 | 45 | 1.111 | 2108 | 2080 | 1.013 | Championship playoffs |
| 8 | Bosca San Bernardo Cuneo | 24 | 13 | 11 | 36 | 47 | 48 | 0.979 | 2026 | 2116 | 0.957 | Championship playoffs |
| 9 | Zanetti Bergamo | 24 | 10 | 14 | 31 | 42 | 51 | 0.824 | 2019 | 2072 | 0.974 | |
| 10 | Banca Valsabbina Millenium Brescia | 24 | 10 | 14 | 30 | 42 | 53 | 0.792 | 2024 | 2106 | 0.961 | |
| 11 | Lardini Filottrano | 24 | 5 | 19 | 14 | 24 | 62 | 0.387 | 1831 | 2048 | 0.894 | |
| 12 | Reale Mutua Fenera Chieri | 24 | 4 | 20 | 12 | 25 | 66 | 0.379 | 1900 | 2128 | 0.893 | Relegated to Serie A2 |
| 13 | Club Italia Crai | 24 | 1 | 23 | 7 | 18 | 70 | 0.257 | 1698 | 2127 | 0.798 | |

Source: Lega Volley Femminile

=== Results table ===
| Home \ Away | BRE | ITA | CUN | CAS | NOV | FIR | CON | FIL | CHI | MON | SCA | BUS | BER |
|---|---|---|---|---|---|---|---|---|---|---|---|---|---|
| Banca Valsabbina Millenium Brescia | | 3–0 | 2–3 | 0–3 | 3–2 | 3–1 | 3–2 | 3–0 | 3–2 | 2–3 | 0–3 | 1–3 | 1–3 |
| Club Italia Crai | 1–3 | | 0–3 | 1–3 | 1–3 | 0–3 | 1–3 | 1–3 | 3–1 | 0–3 | 0–3 | 1–3 | 0–3 |
| Bosca San Bernardo Cuneo | 3–2 | 3–2 | | 3–1 | 3–2 | 3–1 | 0–3 | 3–0 | 3–1 | 1–3 | 3–2 | 0–3 | 3–1 |
| èpiù Pomì Casalmaggiore | 3–2 | 3–2 | 3–1 | | 3–1 | 3–2 | 0–3 | 3–0 | 3–0 | 1–3 | 3–1 | 3–1 | 3–0 |
| Igor Gorgonzola Novara | 3–0 | 3–2 | 3–2 | 3–0 | | 3–0 | 0–3 | 3–1 | 3–0 | 3–0 | 2–3 | 3–0 | 3–0 |
| Il Bisonte Firenze | 3–0 | 3–0 | 3–0 | 1–3 | 0–3 | | 1–3 | 3–1 | 3–0 | 3–2 | 0–3 | 3–1 | 3–2 |
| Imoco Volley Conegliano | 2–3 | 3–1 | 3–0 | 3–0 | 1–3 | 3–2 | | 3–0 | 3–0 | 3–1 | 3–0 | 3–0 | 3–0 |
| Lardini Filottrano | 1–3 | 3–0 | 3–1 | 0–3 | 0–3 | 1–3 | 0–3 | | 3–2 | 0–3 | 1–3 | 1–3 | 3–1 |
| Reale Mutua Fenera Chieri | 0–3 | 3–2 | 1–3 | 1–3 | 3–2 | 1–3 | 0–3 | 3–0 | | 1–3 | 0–3 | 0–3 | 2–3 |
| Saugella Team Monza | 3–1 | 3–0 | 3–2 | 3–0 | 3–1 | 3–2 | 0–3 | 3–1 | 3–0 | | 2–3 | 2–3 | 3–1 |
| Savino Del Bene Scandicci | 3–0 | 3–0 | 0–3 | 3–0 | 0–3 | 3–2 | 3–1 | 3–0 | 3–1 | 3–1 | | 3–2 | 3–2 |
| Unet E-Work Busto Arsizio | 3–0 | 3–0 | 3–0 | 3–1 | 2–3 | 3–2 | 0–3 | 3–1 | 3–0 | 3–1 | 0–3 | | 1–3 |
| Zanetti Bergamo | 3–1 | 3–0 | 3–1 | 3–2 | 1–3 | 1–3 | 0–3 | 3–1 | 2–3 | 1–3 | 3–0 | 0–3 | |

Source: Lega Volley Femminile
Legend: Blue = left column team win; Yellow = draw; Red = top row team win.

=== Fixtures and results ===
- All times are local, CEST (UTC+02:00) on 27 October 2018 and CET (UTC+01:00) from 28 October 2018.

Round 1

| Date | Time | | Score | | Set 1 | Set 2 | Set 3 | Set 4 | Set 5 | Total | Report |
|---|---|---|---|---|---|---|---|---|---|---|---|
| 27 Oct | 20:30 | Imoco Volley Conegliano | 3–0 | èpiù Pomì Casalmaggiore | 25–12 | 25–22 | 25–14 | | | 75–48 | Report |
| 28 Oct | 17:00 | Igor Gorgonzola Novara | 3–0 | Banca Valsabbina Millenium Brescia | 25–11 | 25–22 | 25–12 | | | 75–45 | Report |
| 28 Oct | 17:00 | Saugella Team Monza | 3–0 | Club Italia Crai | 25–21 | 25–15 | 25–18 | | | 75–54 | Report |
| 28 Oct | 17:00 | Il Bisonte Firenze | 3–0 | Reale Mutua Fenera Chieri | 25–23 | 27–25 | 25–20 | | | 77–68 | Report |
| 28 Oct | 17:00 | Zanetti Bergamo | 0–3 | Unet E-Work Busto Arsizio | 24–26 | 15–25 | 20–25 | | | 59–76 | Report |
| 28 Oct | 17:00 | Lardini Filottrano | 1–3 | Savino Del Bene Scandicci | 25–23 | 23–25 | 22–25 | 23–25 | | 93–98 | Report |

Round 2

| Date | Time | | Score | | Set 1 | Set 2 | Set 3 | Set 4 | Set 5 | Total | Report |
|---|---|---|---|---|---|---|---|---|---|---|---|
| 1 Nov | 17:00 | Unet E-Work Busto Arsizio | 3–1 | Saugella Team Monza | 23–25 | 25–21 | 25–22 | 25–16 | | 98–84 | Report |
| 1 Nov | 17:00 | èpiù Pomì Casalmaggiore | 3–0 | Zanetti Bergamo | 25–19 | 25–21 | 25–23 | | | 75–63 | Report |
| 1 Nov | 17:00 | Banca Valsabbina Millenium Brescia | 3–1 | Il Bisonte Firenze | 26–24 | 19–25 | 25–14 | 25–21 | | 95–84 | Report |
| 1 Nov | 17:00 | Reale Mutua Fenera Chieri | 1–3 | Bosca San Bernardo Cuneo | 34–36 | 20–25 | 25–11 | 17–25 | | 96–97 | Report |
| 1 Nov | 17:00 | Club Italia Crai | 1–3 | Lardini Filottrano | 18–25 | 13–25 | 26–24 | 17–25 | | 74–99 | Report |
| 1 Nov | 18:30 | Savino Del Bene Scandicci | 0–3 | Igor Gorgonzola Novara | 19–25 | 18–25 | 19–25 | | | 56–75 | Report |

Round 3

| Date | Time | | Score | | Set 1 | Set 2 | Set 3 | Set 4 | Set 5 | Total | Report |
|---|---|---|---|---|---|---|---|---|---|---|---|
| 3 Nov | 20:30 | Saugella Team Monza | 0–3 | Imoco Volley Conegliano | 25–27 | 19–25 | 19–25 | | | 63–77 | Report |
| 4 Nov | 17:00 | Igor Gorgonzola Novara | 3–0 | Zanetti Bergamo | 25–12 | 25–15 | 25–15 | | | 75–42 | Report |
| 4 Nov | 17:00 | Il Bisonte Firenze | 1–3 | èpiù Pomì Casalmaggiore | 25–19 | 19–25 | 15–25 | 21–25 | | 80–94 | Report |
| 4 Nov | 17:00 | Reale Mutua Fenera Chieri | 0–3 | Savino Del Bene Scandicci | 17–25 | 16–25 | 19–25 | | | 52–75 | Report |
| 4 Nov | 17:00 | Bosca San Bernardo Cuneo | 0–3 | Unet E-Work Busto Arsizio | 18–25 | 15–25 | 19–25 | | | 52–75 | Report |
| 4 Nov | 17:00 | Club Italia Crai | 1–3 | Banca Valsabbina Millenium Brescia | 16–25 | 25–23 | 18–25 | 10–25 | | 69–98 | Report |

Round 4

| Date | Time | | Score | | Set 1 | Set 2 | Set 3 | Set 4 | Set 5 | Total | Report |
|---|---|---|---|---|---|---|---|---|---|---|---|
| 11 Nov | 17:00 | Savino Del Bene Scandicci | 3–0 | Club Italia Crai | 25–19 | 25–12 | 25–21 | | | 75–52 | Report |
| 11 Nov | 17:00 | Lardini Filottrano | 1–3 | Banca Valsabbina Millenium Brescia | 22–25 | 25–23 | 23–25 | 19–25 | | 89–98 | Report |
| 11 Nov | 17:00 | Saugella Team Monza | 3–0 | Reale Mutua Fenera Chieri | 25–19 | 25–17 | 25–21 | | | 75–57 | Report |
| 11 Nov | 17:00 | èpiù Pomì Casalmaggiore | 3–1 | Bosca San Bernardo Cuneo | 25–18 | 17–25 | 25–16 | 25–18 | | 92–77 | Report |
| 11 Nov | 17:00 | Zanetti Bergamo | 1–3 | Il Bisonte Firenze | 26–24 | 11–25 | 19–25 | 23–25 | | 79–99 | Report |
| 28 Nov | 20:30 | Imoco Volley Conegliano | 1–3 | Igor Gorgonzola Novara | 17–25 | 25–15 | 21–25 | 22–25 | | 85–90 | Report |

Round 5

| Date | Time | | Score | | Set 1 | Set 2 | Set 3 | Set 4 | Set 5 | Total | Report |
|---|---|---|---|---|---|---|---|---|---|---|---|
| 14 Nov | 20:30 | Igor Gorgonzola Novara | 3–2 | Club Italia Crai | 21–25 | 22–25 | 25–19 | 25–10 | 15–6 | 108–85 | Report |
| 14 Nov | 20:30 | Il Bisonte Firenze | 3–2 | Saugella Team Monza | 20–25 | 24–26 | 32–30 | 25–15 | 15–12 | 116–108 | Report |
| 14 Nov | 20:30 | èpiù Pomì Casalmaggiore | 3–0 | Lardini Filottrano | 25–21 | 25–19 | 25–22 | | | 75–62 | Report |
| 14 Nov | 20:30 | Imoco Volley Conegliano | 3–0 | Zanetti Bergamo | 25–14 | 25–16 | 25–20 | | | 75–50 | Report |
| 14 Nov | 20:30 | Banca Valsabbina Millenium Brescia | 2–3 | Bosca San Bernardo Cuneo | 25–15 | 25–27 | 22–25 | 25–18 | 12–15 | 109–100 | Report |
| 15 Nov | 20:30 | Reale Mutua Fenera Chieri | 0–3 | Unet E-Work Busto Arsizio | 20–25 | 12–25 | 19–25 | | | 51–75 | Report |

Round 6

| Date | Time | | Score | | Set 1 | Set 2 | Set 3 | Set 4 | Set 5 | Total | Report |
|---|---|---|---|---|---|---|---|---|---|---|---|
| 17 Nov | 20:30 | Bosca San Bernardo Cuneo | 1–3 | Saugella Team Monza | 24–26 | 25–22 | 19–25 | 15–25 | | 83–98 | Report |
| 18 Nov | 17:00 | Igor Gorgonzola Novara | 3–1 | Lardini Filottrano | 25–21 | 19–25 | 25–18 | 25–21 | | 94–85 | Report |
| 18 Nov | 17:00 | Savino Del Bene Scandicci | 3–0 | èpiù Pomì Casalmaggiore | 25–17 | 25–21 | 25–23 | | | 75–61 | Report |
| 18 Nov | 17:00 | Reale Mutua Fenera Chieri | 0–3 | Imoco Volley Conegliano | 24–26 | 24–26 | 23–25 | | | 71–77 | Report |
| 18 Nov | 17:00 | Banca Valsabbina Millenium Brescia | 1–3 | Zanetti Bergamo | 21–25 | 24–26 | 25–22 | 23–25 | | 93–98 | Report |
| 19 Nov | 20:30 | Unet E-Work Busto Arsizio | 3–2 | Il Bisonte Firenze | 17–25 | 16–25 | 25–18 | 25–20 | 15–9 | 98–97 | Report |

Round 7

| Date | Time | | Score | | Set 1 | Set 2 | Set 3 | Set 4 | Set 5 | Total | Report |
|---|---|---|---|---|---|---|---|---|---|---|---|
| 24 Nov | 20:30 | Il Bisonte Firenze | 0–3 | Igor Gorgonzola Novara | 20–25 | 23–25 | 19–25 | | | 62–75 | Report |
| 25 Nov | 17:00 | Saugella Team Monza | 2–3 | Savino Del Bene Scandicci | 25–21 | 26–28 | 25–21 | 21–25 | 11–15 | 108–110 | Report |
| 25 Nov | 17:00 | èpiù Pomì Casalmaggiore | 3–0 | Reale Mutua Fenera Chieri | 25–21 | 25–22 | 25–18 | | | 75–61 | Report |
| 25 Nov | 17:00 | Zanetti Bergamo | 3–1 | Bosca San Bernardo Cuneo | 25–17 | 22–25 | 25–22 | 25–21 | | 97–85 | Report |
| 25 Nov | 17:00 | Lardini Filottrano | 0–3 | Imoco Volley Conegliano | 19–25 | 17–25 | 12–25 | | | 48–75 | Report |
| 25 Nov | 17:00 | Club Italia Crai | 1–3 | Unet E-Work Busto Arsizio | 17–25 | 26–24 | 19–25 | 20–25 | | 82–99 | Report |

Round 8

| Date | Time | | Score | | Set 1 | Set 2 | Set 3 | Set 4 | Set 5 | Total | Report |
|---|---|---|---|---|---|---|---|---|---|---|---|
| 2 Dec | 17:00 | Igor Gorgonzola Novara | 3–0 | Saugella Team Monza | 25–23 | 25–15 | 25–19 | | | 75–57 | Report |
| 2 Dec | 17:00 | Imoco Volley Conegliano | 3–1 | Club Italia Crai | 23–25 | 25–21 | 25–15 | 25–21 | | 98–82 | Report |
| 2 Dec | 17:00 | èpiù Pomì Casalmaggiore | 3–2 | Banca Valsabbina Millenium Brescia | 18–25 | 25–17 | 25–21 | 18–25 | 15–8 | 101–96 | Report |
| 2 Dec | 17:00 | Zanetti Bergamo | 3–1 | Lardini Filottrano | 25–18 | 25–18 | 23–25 | 25–16 | | 98–77 | Report |
| 2 Dec | 17:00 | Bosca San Bernardo Cuneo | 3–1 | Il Bisonte Firenze | 25–19 | 23–25 | 25–21 | 25–23 | | 98–88 | Report |
| 2 Dec | 17:30 | Unet E-Work Busto Arsizio | 0–3 | Savino Del Bene Scandicci | 21–25 | 24–26 | 15–25 | | | 60–76 | Report |

Round 9

| Date | Time | | Score | | Set 1 | Set 2 | Set 3 | Set 4 | Set 5 | Total | Report |
|---|---|---|---|---|---|---|---|---|---|---|---|
| 8 Dec | 20:30 | Lardini Filottrano | 3–1 | Bosca San Bernardo Cuneo | 25–20 | 15–25 | 25–22 | 25–16 | | 90–83 | Report |
| 9 Dec | 17:00 | Savino Del Bene Scandicci | 3–1 | Imoco Volley Conegliano | 14–25 | 25–22 | 26–24 | 25–18 | | 90–89 | Report |
| 9 Dec | 17:00 | Banca Valsabbina Millenium Brescia | 1–3 | Unet E-Work Busto Arsizio | 21–25 | 25–18 | 24–26 | 36–38 | | 106–107 | Report |
| 9 Dec | 17:00 | Reale Mutua Fenera Chieri | 2–3 | Zanetti Bergamo | 25–15 | 14–25 | 25–19 | 23–25 | 10–15 | 97–99 | Report |
| 9 Dec | 17:00 | Club Italia Crai | 0–3 | Il Bisonte Firenze | 21–25 | 19–25 | 24–26 | | | 64–76 | Report |
| 10 Dec | 20:30 | Saugella Team Monza | 3–0 | èpiù Pomì Casalmaggiore | 25–19 | 25–21 | 25–20 | | | 75–60 | Report |

Round 10

| Date | Time | | Score | | Set 1 | Set 2 | Set 3 | Set 4 | Set 5 | Total | Report |
|---|---|---|---|---|---|---|---|---|---|---|---|
| 15 Dec | 20:30 | Igor Gorgonzola Novara | 3–0 | Reale Mutua Fenera Chieri | 25–20 | 25–17 | 25–10 | | | 75–47 | Report |
| 15 Dec | 20:30 | Unet E-Work Busto Arsizio | 3–1 | Lardini Filottrano | 22–25 | 25–17 | 25–19 | 25–23 | | 97–84 | Report |
| 15 Dec | 20:30 | Il Bisonte Firenze | 1–3 | Imoco Volley Conegliano | 21–25 | 25–20 | 21–25 | 21–25 | | 88–95 | Report |
| 15 Dec | 20:30 | Zanetti Bergamo | 3–0 | Club Italia Crai | 25–17 | 25–17 | 28–26 | | | 78–60 | Report |
| 16 Dec | 17:00 | Saugella Team Monza | 3–1 | Banca Valsabbina Millenium Brescia | 25–23 | 25–10 | 22–25 | 25–17 | | 97–75 | Report |
| 16 Dec | 17:00 | Bosca San Bernardo Cuneo | 3–2 | Savino Del Bene Scandicci | 16–25 | 25–22 | 28–26 | 16–25 | 15–7 | 100–105 | Report |

Round 11

| Date | Time | | Score | | Set 1 | Set 2 | Set 3 | Set 4 | Set 5 | Total | Report |
|---|---|---|---|---|---|---|---|---|---|---|---|
| 22 Dec | 20:30 | Banca Valsabbina Millenium Brescia | 3–2 | Reale Mutua Fenera Chieri | 25–23 | 22–25 | 22–25 | 25–20 | 17–15 | 111–108 | Report |
| 23 Dec | 17:00 | Savino Del Bene Scandicci | 3–2 | Il Bisonte Firenze | 17–25 | 17–25 | 25–21 | 25–12 | 15–6 | 99–89 | Report |
| 23 Dec | 17:00 | Imoco Volley Conegliano | 3–0 | Bosca San Bernardo Cuneo | 25–18 | 25–23 | 25–12 | | | 75–53 | Report |
| 23 Dec | 17:00 | Unet E-Work Busto Arsizio | 2–3 | Igor Gorgonzola Novara | 26–24 | 30–28 | 19–25 | 24–26 | 10–15 | 109–118 | Report |
| 23 Dec | 17:00 | Lardini Filottrano | 0–3 | Saugella Team Monza | 27–29 | 21–25 | 21–25 | | | 69–79 | Report |
| 23 Dec | 17:00 | Club Italia Crai | 1–3 | èpiù Pomì Casalmaggiore | 25–27 | 17–25 | 26–24 | 23–25 | | 91–101 | Report |

Round 12

| Date | Time | | Score | | Set 1 | Set 2 | Set 3 | Set 4 | Set 5 | Total | Report |
|---|---|---|---|---|---|---|---|---|---|---|---|
| 26 Dec | 17:00 | Savino Del Bene Scandicci | 3–2 | Zanetti Bergamo | 25–21 | 23–25 | 25–21 | 23–25 | 15–8 | 111–100 | Report |
| 26 Dec | 17:00 | Imoco Volley Conegliano | 2–3 | Banca Valsabbina Millenium Brescia | 25–20 | 24–26 | 25–18 | 22–25 | 17–19 | 113–108 | Report |
| 26 Dec | 17:00 | Bosca San Bernardo Cuneo | 3–2 | Igor Gorgonzola Novara | 25–19 | 25–21 | 19–25 | 23–25 | 16–14 | 108–104 | Report |
| 26 Dec | 17:00 | Il Bisonte Firenze | 3–1 | Lardini Filottrano | 25–22 | 25–15 | 24–26 | 25–21 | | 99–84 | Report |
| 26 Dec | 17:00 | Reale Mutua Fenera Chieri | 3–2 | Club Italia Crai | 19–25 | 25–19 | 23–25 | 25–22 | 19–17 | 111–108 | Report |
| 26 Dec | 18:30 | èpiù Pomì Casalmaggiore | 3–1 | Unet E-Work Busto Arsizio | 25–19 | 25–16 | 13–25 | 26–24 | | 89–84 | Report |

Round 13

| Date | Time | | Score | | Set 1 | Set 2 | Set 3 | Set 4 | Set 5 | Total | Report |
|---|---|---|---|---|---|---|---|---|---|---|---|
| 29 Dec | 20:30 | Igor Gorgonzola Novara | 3–0 | èpiù Pomì Casalmaggiore | 25–13 | 25–18 | 25–23 | | | 75–54 | Report |
| 29 Dec | 20:30 | Unet E-Work Busto Arsizio | 0–3 | Imoco Volley Conegliano | 16–25 | 23–25 | 20–25 | | | 59–75 | Report |
| 29 Dec | 20:30 | Zanetti Bergamo | 1–3 | Saugella Team Monza | 25–20 | 20–25 | 22–25 | 18–25 | | 85–95 | Report |
| 29 Dec | 20:30 | Banca Valsabbina Millenium Brescia | 0–3 | Savino Del Bene Scandicci | 17–25 | 21–25 | 14–25 | | | 52–75 | Report |
| 29 Dec | 20:30 | Lardini Filottrano | 3–2 | Reale Mutua Fenera Chieri | 23–25 | 25–22 | 25–18 | 22–25 | 15–9 | 110–99 | Report |
| 29 Dec | 20:30 | Club Italia Crai | 0–3 | Bosca San Bernardo Cuneo | 18–25 | 21–25 | 17–25 | | | 56–75 | Report |

Round 14

| Date | Time | | Score | | Set 1 | Set 2 | Set 3 | Set 4 | Set 5 | Total | Report |
|---|---|---|---|---|---|---|---|---|---|---|---|
| 5 Jan | 20:30 | Savino Del Bene Scandicci | 3–0 | Lardini Filottrano | 25–21 | 25–15 | 25–14 | | | 75–50 | Report |
| 6 Jan | 17:00 | Banca Valsabbina Millenium Brescia | 3–2 | Igor Gorgonzola Novara | 25–20 | 25–19 | 20–25 | 18–25 | 15–13 | 103–102 | Report |
| 6 Jan | 17:00 | èpiù Pomì Casalmaggiore | 0–3 | Imoco Volley Conegliano | 23–25 | 21–25 | 20–25 | | | 64–75 | Report |
| 6 Jan | 17:00 | Club Italia Crai | 0–3 | Saugella Team Monza | 23–25 | 22–25 | 19–25 | | | 64–75 | Report |
| 6 Jan | 17:00 | Reale Mutua Fenera Chieri | 1–3 | Il Bisonte Firenze | 25–23 | 29–31 | 25–27 | 20–25 | | 99–106 | Report |
| 6 Jan | 17:00 | Unet E-Work Busto Arsizio | 1–3 | Zanetti Bergamo | 27–29 | 23–25 | 25–18 | 23–25 | | 98–97 | Report |

Round 15

| Date | Time | | Score | | Set 1 | Set 2 | Set 3 | Set 4 | Set 5 | Total | Report |
|---|---|---|---|---|---|---|---|---|---|---|---|
| 9 Jan | 20:30 | Igor Gorgonzola Novara | 2–3 | Savino Del Bene Scandicci | 25–21 | 20–25 | 22–25 | 25–21 | 12–15 | 104–107 | Report |
| 9 Jan | 20:30 | Zanetti Bergamo | 3–2 | èpiù Pomì Casalmaggiore | 25–20 | 25–22 | 21–25 | 17–25 | 15–9 | 103–101 | Report |
| 9 Jan | 20:30 | Il Bisonte Firenze | 3–0 | Banca Valsabbina Millenium Brescia | 25–23 | 25–21 | 27–25 | | | 77–69 | Report |
| 9 Jan | 20:30 | Bosca San Bernardo Cuneo | 3–1 | Reale Mutua Fenera Chieri | 25–22 | 22–25 | 25–15 | 25–20 | | 97–82 | Report |
| 9 Jan | 20:30 | Lardini Filottrano | 3–0 | Club Italia Crai | 25–23 | 25–20 | 25–21 | | | 75–64 | Report |
| 10 Jan | 20:30 | Saugella Team Monza | 2–3 | Unet E-Work Busto Arsizio | 25–23 | 18–25 | 19–25 | 25–21 | 10–15 | 97–109 | Report |

Round 16

| Date | Time | | Score | | Set 1 | Set 2 | Set 3 | Set 4 | Set 5 | Total | Report |
|---|---|---|---|---|---|---|---|---|---|---|---|
| 12 Jan | 20:30 | èpiù Pomì Casalmaggiore | 3–2 | Il Bisonte Firenze | 25–21 | 25–19 | 21–25 | 16–25 | 15–13 | 102–103 | Report |
| 13 Jan | 17:00 | Zanetti Bergamo | 1–3 | Igor Gorgonzola Novara | 21–25 | 25–23 | 22–25 | 18–25 | | 86–98 | Report |
| 13 Jan | 17:00 | Imoco Volley Conegliano | 3–1 | Saugella Team Monza | 25–20 | 25–21 | 19–25 | 25–22 | | 94–88 | Report |
| 13 Jan | 17:00 | Savino Del Bene Scandicci | 3–1 | Reale Mutua Fenera Chieri | 25–20 | 25–22 | 24–26 | 25–14 | | 99–82 | Report |
| 13 Jan | 17:00 | Unet E-Work Busto Arsizio | 3–0 | Bosca San Bernardo Cuneo | 25–18 | 25–12 | 25–18 | | | 75–48 | Report |
| 13 Jan | 17:00 | Banca Valsabbina Millenium Brescia | 3–0 | Club Italia Crai | 25–16 | 25–15 | 25–13 | | | 75–44 | Report |

Round 17

| Date | Time | | Score | | Set 1 | Set 2 | Set 3 | Set 4 | Set 5 | Total | Report |
|---|---|---|---|---|---|---|---|---|---|---|---|
| 26 Jan | 18:00 | Banca Valsabbina Millenium Brescia | 3–0 | Lardini Filottrano | 27–25 | 25–20 | 25–22 | | | 77–67 | Report |
| 26 Jan | 20:30 | Igor Gorgonzola Novara | 0–3 | Imoco Volley Conegliano | 20–25 | 18–25 | 23–25 | | | 61–75 | Report |
| 27 Jan | 17:00 | Club Italia Crai | 0–3 | Savino Del Bene Scandicci | 15–25 | 15–25 | 20–25 | | | 50–75 | Report |
| 27 Jan | 17:00 | Reale Mutua Fenera Chieri | 1–3 | Saugella Team Monza | 19–25 | 27–25 | 20–25 | 22–25 | | 88–100 | Report |
| 27 Jan | 17:00 | Bosca San Bernardo Cuneo | 3–1 | èpiù Pomì Casalmaggiore | 18–25 | 25–23 | 26–24 | 25–13 | | 94–85 | Report |
| 27 Jan | 17:00 | Il Bisonte Firenze | 3–2 | Zanetti Bergamo | 25–21 | 25–18 | 22–25 | 24–26 | 15–12 | 111–102 | Report |

Round 18

| Date | Time | | Score | | Set 1 | Set 2 | Set 3 | Set 4 | Set 5 | Total | Report |
|---|---|---|---|---|---|---|---|---|---|---|---|
| 29 Jan | 20:30 | Zanetti Bergamo | 0–3 | Imoco Volley Conegliano | 23–25 | 17–25 | 25–27 | | | 65–77 | Report |
| 30 Jan | 20:30 | Club Italia Crai | 1–3 | Igor Gorgonzola Novara | 13–25 | 26–24 | 15–25 | 21–25 | | 75–99 | Report |
| 30 Jan | 20:30 | Lardini Filottrano | 0–3 | èpiù Pomì Casalmaggiore | 18–25 | 17–25 | 20–25 | | | 55–75 | Report |
| 30 Jan | 20:30 | Bosca San Bernardo Cuneo | 3–2 | Banca Valsabbina Millenium Brescia | 20–25 | 25–22 | 22–25 | 25–17 | 17–15 | 109–104 | Report |
| 30 Jan | 20:30 | Unet E-Work Busto Arsizio | 3–0 | Reale Mutua Fenera Chieri | 25–21 | 25–15 | 25–21 | | | 75–57 | Report |
| 31 Jan | 20:30 | Saugella Team Monza | 3–2 | Il Bisonte Firenze | 19–25 | 19–25 | 28–26 | 25–13 | 16–14 | 107–103 | Report |

Round 19

| Date | Time | | Score | | Set 1 | Set 2 | Set 3 | Set 4 | Set 5 | Total | Report |
|---|---|---|---|---|---|---|---|---|---|---|---|
| 9 Feb | 20:30 | Zanetti Bergamo | 3–1 | Banca Valsabbina Millenium Brescia | 25–13 | 22–25 | 25–15 | 25–21 | | 97–74 | Report |
| 10 Feb | 17:00 | Lardini Filottrano | 0–3 | Igor Gorgonzola Novara | 22–25 | 16–25 | 15–25 | | | 53–75 | Report |
| 10 Feb | 17:00 | èpiù Pomì Casalmaggiore | 3–1 | Savino Del Bene Scandicci | 26–24 | 25–20 | 17–25 | 27–25 | | 95–94 | Report |
| 10 Feb | 17:00 | Imoco Volley Conegliano | 3–0 | Reale Mutua Fenera Chieri | 25–23 | 25–23 | 25–15 | | | 75–61 | Report |
| 10 Feb | 17:00 | Il Bisonte Firenze | 3–1 | Unet E-Work Busto Arsizio | 26–24 | 25–19 | 18–25 | 25–12 | | 94–80 | Report |
| 10 Feb | 17:00 | Saugella Team Monza | 3–2 | Bosca San Bernardo Cuneo | 32–34 | 25–11 | 22–25 | 25–20 | 15–9 | 119–99 | Report |

Round 20

| Date | Time | | Score | | Set 1 | Set 2 | Set 3 | Set 4 | Set 5 | Total | Report |
|---|---|---|---|---|---|---|---|---|---|---|---|
| 16 Feb | 20:30 | Igor Gorgonzola Novara | 3–0 | Il Bisonte Firenze | 25–19 | 26–24 | 25–19 | | | 76–62 | Report |
| 16 Feb | 20:30 | Imoco Volley Conegliano | 3–0 | Lardini Filottrano | 25–22 | 25–23 | 25–23 | | | 75–68 | Report |
| 17 Feb | 17:00 | Savino Del Bene Scandicci | 3–1 | Saugella Team Monza | 27–29 | 25–21 | 25–23 | 25–13 | | 102–86 | Report |
| 17 Feb | 17:00 | Reale Mutua Fenera Chieri | 1–3 | èpiù Pomì Casalmaggiore | 22–25 | 21–25 | 26–24 | 15–25 | | 84–99 | Report |
| 17 Feb | 17:00 | Bosca San Bernardo Cuneo | 3–1 | Zanetti Bergamo | 15–25 | 25–20 | 25–15 | 25–22 | | 90–82 | Report |
| 17 Feb | 17:00 | Unet E-Work Busto Arsizio | 3–0 | Club Italia Crai | 25–20 | 25–14 | 25–14 | | | 75–48 | Report |

Round 21

| Date | Time | | Score | | Set 1 | Set 2 | Set 3 | Set 4 | Set 5 | Total | Report |
|---|---|---|---|---|---|---|---|---|---|---|---|
| 23 Feb | 20:30 | Saugella Team Monza | 3–1 | Igor Gorgonzola Novara | 23–25 | 25–16 | 25–20 | 25–20 | | 98–81 | Report |
| 23 Feb | 20:30 | Savino Del Bene Scandicci | 3–2 | Unet E-Work Busto Arsizio | 22–25 | 25–23 | 25–21 | 23–25 | 15–12 | 110–106 | Report |
| 24 Feb | 17:00 | Club Italia Crai | 1–3 | Imoco Volley Conegliano | 33–31 | 15–25 | 17–25 | 27–29 | | 92–110 | Report |
| 24 Feb | 17:00 | Banca Valsabbina Millenium Brescia | 0–3 | èpiù Pomì Casalmaggiore | 22–25 | 24–26 | 22–25 | | | 68–76 | Report |
| 24 Feb | 17:00 | Lardini Filottrano | 3–1 | Zanetti Bergamo | 30–28 | 27–29 | 25–16 | 25–22 | | 107–95 | Report |
| 24 Feb | 17:00 | Il Bisonte Firenze | 3–0 | Bosca San Bernardo Cuneo | 25–21 | 25–23 | 25–22 | | | 75–66 | Report |

Round 22

| Date | Time | | Score | | Set 1 | Set 2 | Set 3 | Set 4 | Set 5 | Total | Report |
|---|---|---|---|---|---|---|---|---|---|---|---|
| 2 Mar | 20:30 | Unet E-Work Busto Arsizio | 3–0 | Banca Valsabbina Millenium Brescia | 25–18 | 25–20 | 25–18 | | | 75–56 | Report |
| 3 Mar | 17:00 | Imoco Volley Conegliano | 3–0 | Savino Del Bene Scandicci | 25–20 | 25–16 | 25–19 | | | 75–55 | Report |
| 3 Mar | 17:00 | èpiù Pomì Casalmaggiore | 1–3 | Saugella Team Monza | 21–25 | 25–20 | 17–25 | 20–25 | | 83–95 | Report |
| 3 Mar | 17:00 | Zanetti Bergamo | 2–3 | Reale Mutua Fenera Chieri | 25–23 | 20–25 | 22–25 | 25–9 | 9–15 | 101–97 | Report |
| 3 Mar | 17:00 | Bosca San Bernardo Cuneo | 3–0 | Lardini Filottrano | 25–18 | 25–15 | 25–23 | | | 75–56 | Report |
| 5 Mar | 20:30 | Il Bisonte Firenze | 3–0 | Club Italia Crai | 25–14 | 25–21 | 25–17 | | | 75–52 | Report |

Round 23

| Date | Time | | Score | | Set 1 | Set 2 | Set 3 | Set 4 | Set 5 | Total | Report |
|---|---|---|---|---|---|---|---|---|---|---|---|
| 9 Mar | 20:30 | Reale Mutua Fenera Chieri | 3–2 | Igor Gorgonzola Novara | 22–25 | 22–25 | 25–21 | 25–19 | 15–13 | 109–103 | Report |
| 9 Mar | 20:30 | Imoco Volley Conegliano | 3–2 | Il Bisonte Firenze | 25–16 | 24–26 | 25–20 | 19–25 | 15–8 | 108–95 | Report |
| 9 Mar | 20:30 | Savino Del Bene Scandicci | 0–3 | Bosca San Bernardo Cuneo | 25–27 | 23–25 | 21–25 | | | 69–77 | Report |
| 10 Mar | 17:00 | Lardini Filottrano | 1–3 | Unet E-Work Busto Arsizio | 19–25 | 22–25 | 27–25 | 23–25 | | 91–100 | Report |
| 10 Mar | 17:00 | Banca Valsabbina Millenium Brescia | 2–3 | Saugella Team Monza | 25–15 | 25–20 | 12–25 | 25–27 | 12–15 | 99–102 | Report |
| 10 Mar | 17:00 | Club Italia Crai | 0–3 | Zanetti Bergamo | 23–25 | 17–25 | 4–25 | | | 44–75 | Report |

Round 24

| Date | Time | | Score | | Set 1 | Set 2 | Set 3 | Set 4 | Set 5 | Total | Report |
|---|---|---|---|---|---|---|---|---|---|---|---|
| 16 Mar | 20:30 | Il Bisonte Firenze | 0–3 | Savino Del Bene Scandicci | 16–25 | 22–25 | 15–25 | | | 53–75 | Report |
| 16 Mar | 20:30 | Bosca San Bernardo Cuneo | 0–3 | Imoco Volley Conegliano | 16–25 | 27–29 | 13–25 | | | 56–79 | Report |
| 16 Mar | 20:30 | Igor Gorgonzola Novara | 3–0 | Unet E-Work Busto Arsizio | 30–28 | 25–18 | 25–21 | | | 80–67 | Report |
| 17 Mar | 17:00 | Reale Mutua Fenera Chieri | 0–3 | Banca Valsabbina Millenium Brescia | 23–25 | 15–25 | 23–25 | | | 61–75 | Report |
| 17 Mar | 17:00 | Saugella Team Monza | 3–1 | Lardini Filottrano | 19–25 | 25–18 | 25–21 | 25–18 | | 94–82 | Report |
| 17 Mar | 17:00 | èpiù Pomì Casalmaggiore | 3–2 | Club Italia Crai | 25–18 | 19–25 | 25–18 | 20–25 | 15–9 | 104–95 | Report |

Round 25

| Date | Time | | Score | | Set 1 | Set 2 | Set 3 | Set 4 | Set 5 | Total | Report |
|---|---|---|---|---|---|---|---|---|---|---|---|
| 23 Mar | 20:30 | Zanetti Bergamo | 3–0 | Savino Del Bene Scandicci | 25–22 | 28–26 | 25–16 | | | 78–64 | Report |
| 23 Mar | 20:30 | Unet E-Work Busto Arsizio | 3–1 | èpiù Pomì Casalmaggiore | 25–21 | 30–32 | 25–23 | 25–16 | | 105–92 | Report |
| 24 Mar | 17:00 | Banca Valsabbina Millenium Brescia | 3–2 | Imoco Volley Conegliano | 25–15 | 17–25 | 15–25 | 28–26 | 16–14 | 101–105 | Report |
| 24 Mar | 17:00 | Igor Gorgonzola Novara | 3–2 | Bosca San Bernardo Cuneo | 25–15 | 25–18 | 18–25 | 23–25 | 15–12 | 106–95 | Report |
| 24 Mar | 17:00 | Lardini Filottrano | 1–3 | Il Bisonte Firenze | 26–24 | 21–25 | 19–25 | 21–25 | | 87–99 | Report |
| 24 Mar | 17:00 | Club Italia Crai | 3–1 | Reale Mutua Fenera Chieri | 25–17 | 25–22 | 19–25 | 25–23 | | 94–87 | Report |

Round 26

| Date | Time | | Score | | Set 1 | Set 2 | Set 3 | Set 4 | Set 5 | Total | Report |
|---|---|---|---|---|---|---|---|---|---|---|---|
| 30 Mar | 20:30 | èpiù Pomì Casalmaggiore | 3–1 | Igor Gorgonzola Novara | 25–18 | 19–25 | 25–19 | 25–21 | | 94–83 | Report |
| 30 Mar | 20:30 | Imoco Volley Conegliano | 3–0 | Unet E-Work Busto Arsizio | 25–20 | 27–25 | 25–19 | | | 77–64 | Report |
| 30 Mar | 20:30 | Saugella Team Monza | 3–1 | Zanetti Bergamo | 16–25 | 27–25 | 25–20 | 25–20 | | 93–90 | Report |
| 30 Mar | 20:30 | Savino Del Bene Scandicci | 3–0 | Banca Valsabbina Millenium Brescia | 25–19 | 25–7 | 25–11 | | | 75–37 | Report |
| 30 Mar | 20:30 | Reale Mutua Fenera Chieri | 3–0 | Lardini Filottrano | 25–18 | 25–15 | 25–17 | | | 75–50 | Report |
| 30 Mar | 20:30 | Bosca San Bernardo Cuneo | 3–2 | Club Italia Crai | 20–25 | 23–25 | 25–13 | 25–22 | 16–14 | 109–99 | Report |

== Championship playoffs ==
- All times are local, CEST (UTC+02:00).

=== Bracket ===
Quarterfinals
1 | Imoco Volley Conegliano | 3 | 3
8 | Bosca San Bernardo Cuneo | 0 | 0
4 | Saugella Team Monza | 2 | 3 | 3
5 | Unet E-Work Busto Arsizio | 3 | 1 | 0
2 | Igor Gorgonzola Novara | 0 | 3 | 3
7 | Il Bisonte Firenze | 3 | 1 | 2
3 | Savino Del Bene Scandicci | 3 | 3
6 | èpiù Pomì Casalmaggiore | 1 | 0

Semifinals
1 | Imoco Volley Conegliano | 3 | 3 | 3
4 | Saugella Team Monza | 0 | 0 | 1
2 | Igor Gorgonzola Novara | 2 | 3 | 3 | 3
3 | Savino Del Bene Scandicci | 3 | 1 | 2 | 2

Finals
1 | Imoco Volley Conegliano | 3 | 3 | 3
2 | Igor Gorgonzola Novara | 0 | 0 | 2

=== Quarterfinals ===
==== (1) Imoco Volley Conegliano vs. (8) Bosca San Bernardo Cuneo ====
| Date | Time | | Score | | Set 1 | Set 2 | Set 3 | Set 4 | Set 5 | Total | Report |
|---|---|---|---|---|---|---|---|---|---|---|---|
| 6 Apr | 20:30 | Bosca San Bernardo Cuneo | 0–3 | Imoco Volley Conegliano | 22–25 | 19–25 | 16–25 | | | 57–75 | Report |
| 13 Apr | 20:30 | Imoco Volley Conegliano | 3–0 | Bosca San Bernardo Cuneo | 25–20 | 26–24 | 25–21 | | | 76–65 | Report |

Imoco Volley Conegliano wins series, 2–0.

==== (2) Igor Gorgonzola Novara vs. (7) Il Bisonte Firenze ====
| Date | Time | | Score | | Set 1 | Set 2 | Set 3 | Set 4 | Set 5 | Total | Report |
|---|---|---|---|---|---|---|---|---|---|---|---|
| 7 Apr | 17:00 | Il Bisonte Firenze | 3–0 | Igor Gorgonzola Novara | 25–20 | 25–22 | 25–17 | | | 75–59 | Report |
| 13 Apr | 20:30 | Igor Gorgonzola Novara | 3–1 | Il Bisonte Firenze | 27–25 | 25–14 | 21–25 | 25–23 | | 98–87 | Report |
| 15 Apr | 20:30 | Igor Gorgonzola Novara | 3–2 | Il Bisonte Firenze | 25–22 | 25–22 | 21–25 | 12–25 | 17–15 | 100–109 | Report |

Igor Gorgonzola Novara wins series, 2–1.

==== (3) Savino Del Bene Scandicci vs. (6) èpiù Pomì Casalmaggiore ====
| Date | Time | | Score | | Set 1 | Set 2 | Set 3 | Set 4 | Set 5 | Total | Report |
|---|---|---|---|---|---|---|---|---|---|---|---|
| 6 Apr | 20:30 | èpiù Pomì Casalmaggiore | 1–3 | Savino Del Bene Scandicci | 18–25 | 21–25 | 25–17 | 20–25 | | 84–92 | Report |
| 13 Apr | 20:30 | Savino Del Bene Scandicci | 3–0 | èpiù Pomì Casalmaggiore | 25–17 | 25–22 | 25–18 | | | 75–57 | Report |

Savino Del Bene Scandicci wins series, 2–0.

==== (4) Saugella Team Monza vs. (5) Unet E-Work Busto Arsizio ====
| Date | Time | | Score | | Set 1 | Set 2 | Set 3 | Set 4 | Set 5 | Total | Report |
|---|---|---|---|---|---|---|---|---|---|---|---|
| 7 Apr | 17:00 | Unet E-Work Busto Arsizio | 3–2 | Saugella Team Monza | 22–25 | 25–17 | 25–20 | 19–25 | 15–12 | 106–99 | Report |
| 13 Apr | 20:30 | Saugella Team Monza | 3–1 | Unet E-Work Busto Arsizio | 28–26 | 23–25 | 25–23 | 25–20 | | 101–94 | Report |
| 15 Apr | 20:30 | Saugella Team Monza | 3–0 | Unet E-Work Busto Arsizio | 25–22 | 25–18 | 25–23 | | | 75–63 | Report |

Saugella Team Monza wins series, 2–1.

=== Semifinals ===
==== (1) Imoco Volley Conegliano vs. (4) Saugella Team Monza ====
| Date | Time | | Score | | Set 1 | Set 2 | Set 3 | Set 4 | Set 5 | Total | Report |
|---|---|---|---|---|---|---|---|---|---|---|---|
| 19 Apr | 20:30 | Saugella Team Monza | 0–3 | Imoco Volley Conegliano | 16–25 | 14–25 | 16–25 | | | 46–75 | Report |
| 21 Apr | 20:30 | Imoco Volley Conegliano | 3–0 | Saugella Team Monza | 25–19 | 25–12 | 25–22 | | | 75–53 | Report |
| 23 Apr | 20:30 | Imoco Volley Conegliano | 3–1 | Saugella Team Monza | 22–25 | 25–20 | 25–19 | 25–14 | | 97–78 | Report |

Imoco Volley Conegliano wins series, 3–0.

==== (2) Igor Gorgonzola Novara vs. (3) Savino Del Bene Scandicci ====
| Date | Time | | Score | | Set 1 | Set 2 | Set 3 | Set 4 | Set 5 | Total | Report |
|---|---|---|---|---|---|---|---|---|---|---|---|
| 18 Apr | 20:30 | Savino Del Bene Scandicci | 3–2 | Igor Gorgonzola Novara | 25–16 | 15–25 | 25–17 | 23–25 | 15–12 | 103–95 | Report |
| 20 Apr | 18:00 | Igor Gorgonzola Novara | 3–1 | Savino Del Bene Scandicci | 27–25 | 25–18 | 23–25 | 25–19 | | 100–87 | Report |
| 22 Apr | 16:00 | Igor Gorgonzola Novara | 3–2 | Savino Del Bene Scandicci | 14–25 | 25–22 | 23–25 | 25–18 | 15–11 | 102–101 | Report |
| 25 Apr | 18:30 | Savino Del Bene Scandicci | 2–3 | Igor Gorgonzola Novara | 16–25 | 25–21 | 25–13 | 21–25 | 19–21 | 106–105 | Report |

Igor Gorgonzola Novara wins series, 3–1.

=== Finals ===
==== (1) Imoco Volley Conegliano vs. (2) Igor Gorgonzola Novara ====
| Date | Time | | Score | | Set 1 | Set 2 | Set 3 | Set 4 | Set 5 | Total | Report |
|---|---|---|---|---|---|---|---|---|---|---|---|
| 1 May | 18:00 | Igor Gorgonzola Novara | 0–3 | Imoco Volley Conegliano | 15–25 | 20–25 | 15–25 | | | 50–75 | Report |
| 4 May | 20:30 | Imoco Volley Conegliano | 3–0 | Igor Gorgonzola Novara | 25–16 | 25–23 | 25–23 | | | 75–62 | Report |
| 6 May | 20:30 | Imoco Volley Conegliano | 3–2 | Igor Gorgonzola Novara | 25–16 | 23–25 | 25–11 | 20–25 | 15–13 | 108–90 | Report |

Imoco Volley Conegliano wins series, 3–0.

== Final standings ==
| 1st place, gold medalist(s) | Imoco Volley Conegliano |
| 2nd place, silver medalist(s) | Igor Gorgonzola Novara |
| | Savino Del Bene Scandicci |
| | Saugella Team Monza |
| | Unet E-Work Busto Arsizio |

Qualified for 2019–20 CEV Champions League
Qualified for 2019–20 CEV Cup
Qualified for 2019–20 CEV Challenge Cup

2018–19 Italian champions
Imoco Volley Conegliano
3rd title

Marta Bechis, Robin de Kruijf, Elina Rodríguez, Raphaela Folie, Eleonora Fersino, Karsta Lowe, Monica De Gennaro, Anna Danesi, Samanta Fabris, Joanna Wołosz (C), Kimberly Hill, Valentina Tirozzi, Miriam Sylla, Gaia Moretto
Head coach
Daniele Santarelli
