= 2017–18 Italian Women's Volleyball League =

2017–18 Italian Women's Serie A1
- League: Italian Women's Volleyball League
- Sport: Volleyball
- Duration: 14 October 2017 – 29 April 2018
- Teams: 12

Regular Season
- Season champions: Igor Gorgonzola Novara
- Top scorer: Isabelle Haak

Finals
- Champions: Imoco Volley Conegliano
- Runners-up: Igor Gorgonzola Novara
- Finals MVP: Joanna Wolosz

Italian Women's Volleyball League seasons
- ← 2016–17 2018–19 →

The 2017–18 Serie A1 was the 73rd season of the highest professional Italian Women's Volleyball League. The season took place from October to May, and was contested by twelve teams.

== Format ==
The regular season consists of 22 rounds, where the twelve participating teams play each other twice (once home and once away). At the completion of the regular season, the eight best teams advance to the playoffs and the teams finishing in 11th and 12th are relegated to Serie A2.

The standings criteria are:

- highest number of result points (points awarded for results: 3 points for 3–0 or 3–1 wins, 2 points for 3–2 win, 1 point for 2–3 loss);
- highest number of matches won;
- highest set quotient (the number of total sets won divided by the number of total sets lost);
- highest points quotient (the number of total points scored divided by the number of total points conceded).

== Teams ==
| Club | Venue | Capacity | City/Area | Clubs locations in Italy |
| Foppapedretti Bergamo | PalaNorda | 2,250 | Bergamo | Clubs locations in Italy |
| Unet E-Work Busto Arsizio | PalaYamamay | 5,000 | Busto Arsizio | Clubs locations in Italy |
| Pomì Casalmaggiore | PalaRadi | 2,918 | Cremona | Clubs locations in Italy |
| Imoco Volley Conegliano | PalaVerde | 5,134 | Treviso | Clubs locations in Italy |
| Lardini Filottrano | PalaBaldinelli | 3,481 | Filottrano | Clubs locations in Italy |
| Il Bisonte Firenze | Nelson Mandela Forum | 7,500 | Florence | Clubs locations in Italy |
| SAB Volley Legnano | PalaBorsani | 1,650 | Legnano | Clubs locations in Italy |
| Liu Jo Nordmeccanica Modena | PalaPanini | 5,200 | Modena / Piacenza | Clubs locations in Italy |
| Saugella Team Monza | PalaIper | 4,500 | Monza | Clubs locations in Italy |
| Igor Gorgonzola Novara | PalaTerdoppio | 5,000 | Novara | Clubs locations in Italy |
| myCicero Volley Pesaro | Padiglione D | 2,000 | Pesaro | Clubs locations in Italy |
| Savino Del Bene Scandicci | Palazzetto dello Sport | 2,000 | Scandicci | Clubs locations in Italy |

== Regular season ==
=== League table ===
| Pos | Team | Pld | W | L | Pts | SW | SL | SR | SPW | SPL | SPR | Qualification or relegation |
|---|---|---|---|---|---|---|---|---|---|---|---|---|
| 1 | Igor Gorgonzola Novara | 22 | 17 | 5 | 51 | 60 | 25 | 2.400 | 1992 | 1778 | 1.120 | Advance to Playoffs |
| 2 | Savino Del Bene Scandicci | 22 | 18 | 4 | 50 | 56 | 24 | 2.333 | 1865 | 1560 | 1.196 | Advance to Playoffs |
| 3 | Imoco Volley Conegliano | 22 | 17 | 5 | 50 | 57 | 27 | 2.111 | 1962 | 1701 | 1.153 | Advance to Playoffs |
| 4 | Unet E-Work Busto Arsizio | 22 | 12 | 10 | 39 | 49 | 41 | 1.195 | 1977 | 1899 | 1.041 | Advance to Playoffs |
| 5 | Saugella Team Monza | 22 | 13 | 9 | 37 | 48 | 42 | 1.143 | 1989 | 1943 | 1.024 | Advance to Playoffs |
| 6 | Liu Jo Nordmeccanica Modena | 22 | 12 | 10 | 33 | 44 | 44 | 1.000 | 1888 | 1939 | 0.974 | Advance to Playoffs |
| 7 | myCicero Volley Pesaro | 22 | 10 | 12 | 32 | 39 | 44 | 0.886 | 1776 | 1820 | 0.976 | Advance to Playoffs |
| 8 | Il Bisonte Firenze | 22 | 8 | 14 | 27 | 37 | 46 | 0.804 | 1807 | 1881 | 0.961 | Advance to Playoffs |
| 9 | Pomì Casalmaggiore | 22 | 6 | 16 | 23 | 37 | 54 | 0.685 | 1924 | 2037 | 0.945 | |
| 10 | Foppapedretti Bergamo | 22 | 7 | 15 | 19 | 33 | 54 | 0.611 | 1848 | 2025 | 0.913 | |
| 11 | Lardini Filottrano | 22 | 7 | 15 | 19 | 29 | 55 | 0.527 | 1753 | 1937 | 0.905 | Relegated to Serie A2 |
| 12 | SAB Volley Legnano | 22 | 5 | 17 | 16 | 24 | 57 | 0.421 | 1642 | 1903 | 0.863 | Relegated to Serie A2 |

Source: Lega Pallavolo Serie A Femminile

=== Results table ===
| Home \ Away | BER | NOV | FIR | CON | FIL | MOD | CAS | LEG | MON | SCA | BUS | PES |
|---|---|---|---|---|---|---|---|---|---|---|---|---|
| Foppapedretti Bergamo | | 3–2 | 3–2 | 1–3 | 3–1 | 1–3 | 1–3 | 3–0 | 1–3 | 1–3 | 3–2 | 3–0 |
| Igor Gorgonzola Novara | 3–0 | | 3–0 | 2–3 | 3–1 | 3–0 | 3–2 | 3–0 | 3–1 | 3–0 | 3–2 | 3–2 |
| Il Bisonte Firenze | 3–0 | 0–3 | | 1–3 | 3–0 | 3–0 | 3–2 | 3–0 | 3–1 | 0–3 | 2–3 | 3–0 |
| Imoco Volley Conegliano | 3–1 | 2–3 | 3–1 | | 3–0 | 2–3 | 3–1 | 3–0 | 3–0 | 0–3 | 3–0 | 3–0 |
| Lardini Filottrano | 3–1 | 3–2 | 3–2 | 0–3 | | 0–3 | 3–1 | 2–3 | 1–3 | 1–3 | 3–2 | 3–1 |
| Liu Jo Nordmeccanica Modena | 3–0 | 0–3 | 1–3 | 2–3 | 3–0 | | 3–1 | 3–2 | 2–3 | 0–3 | 2–3 | 3–0 |
| Pomì Casalmaggiore | 2–3 | 3–1 | 3–1 | 0–3 | 3–0 | 2–3 | | 3–2 | 1–3 | 3–1 | 2–3 | 0–3 |
| SAB Volley Legnano | 3–0 | 0–3 | 3–1 | 0–3 | 1–3 | 2–3 | 3–2 | | 0–3 | 0–3 | 3–1 | 1–3 |
| Saugella Team Monza | 3–2 | 3–2 | 3–0 | 3–1 | 3–1 | 2–3 | 3–1 | 3–1 | | 1–3 | 1–3 | 2–3 |
| Savino Del Bene Scandicci | 3–2 | 0–3 | 3–0 | 1–3 | 3–0 | 3–0 | 3–0 | 3–0 | 3–1 | | 3–2 | 3–0 |
| Unet E-Work Busto Arsizio | 3–1 | 0–3 | 3–1 | 2–3 | 3–0 | 3–1 | 3–1 | 3–0 | 3–0 | 2–3 | | 3–0 |
| myCicero Volley Pesaro | 3–0 | 0–3 | 3–2 | 3–1 | 3–1 | 2–3 | 3–1 | 3–0 | 2–3 | 2–3 | 3–0 | |

Source: Samsung Galaxy Volley Cup A1
Legend: Blue = left column team win; Yellow = draw; Red = top row team win.

=== Fixtures and results ===
- All times are local, CEST (UTC+02:00) between 14 and 28 October 2017 and CET (UTC+01:00) from 29 October.

Round 1

| Date | Time | | Score | | Set 1 | Set 2 | Set 3 | Set 4 | Set 5 | Total | Report |
|---|---|---|---|---|---|---|---|---|---|---|---|
| 14 Oct | 20:30 | Pomì Casalmaggiore | 0–3 | Imoco Volley Conegliano | 22–25 | 20–25 | 18–25 | | | 60–75 | Report |
| 14 Oct | 20:30 | Igor Gorgonzola Novara | 3–2 | Unet E-Work Busto Arsizio | 32–30 | 25–22 | 20–25 | 21–25 | 15–12 | 113–114 | Report |
| 14 Oct | 20:30 | Liu Jo Nordmeccanica Modena | 0–3 | Savino Del Bene Scandicci | 14–25 | 12–25 | 14–25 | | | 40–75 | Report |
| 15 Oct | 17:00 | Il Bisonte Firenze | 3–1 | Saugella Team Monza | 25–23 | 21–25 | 25–23 | 25–23 | | 96–94 | Report |
| 15 Oct | 17:00 | Lardini Filottrano | 3–1 | myCicero Volley Pesaro | 20–25 | 25–12 | 25–19 | 25–18 | | 95–74 | Report |
| 15 Oct | 17:00 | SAB Volley Legnano | 3–0 | Foppapedretti Bergamo | 25–18 | 25–14 | 25–16 | | | 75–48 | Report |

Round 2

| Date | Time | | Score | | Set 1 | Set 2 | Set 3 | Set 4 | Set 5 | Total | Report |
|---|---|---|---|---|---|---|---|---|---|---|---|
| 21 Oct | 20:30 | Savino Del Bene Scandicci | 3–0 | Pomì Casalmaggiore | 25–18 | 25–20 | 25–19 | | | 75–57 | Report |
| 21 Oct | 20:30 | Unet E-Work Busto Arsizio | 3–0 | Lardini Filottrano | 25–18 | 25–21 | 25–16 | | | 75–55 | Report |
| 22 Oct | 17:00 | Foppapedretti Bergamo | 1–3 | Liu Jo Nordmeccanica Modena | 27–29 | 25–19 | 16–25 | 18–25 | | 86–98 | Report |
| 22 Oct | 17:00 | Saugella Team Monza | 3–1 | SAB Volley Legnano | 28–26 | 21–25 | 25–18 | 25–14 | | 99–83 | Report |
| 22 Oct | 17:00 | myCicero Volley Pesaro | 0–3 | Igor Gorgonzola Novara | 19–25 | 19–25 | 19–25 | | | 57–75 | Report |
| 25 Oct | 20:30 | Imoco Volley Conegliano | 3–1 | Il Bisonte Firenze | 20–25 | 34–32 | 25–21 | 25–21 | | 104–99 | Report |

Round 3

| Date | Time | | Score | | Set 1 | Set 2 | Set 3 | Set 4 | Set 5 | Total | Report |
|---|---|---|---|---|---|---|---|---|---|---|---|
| 28 Oct | 20:30 | Liu Jo Nordmeccanica Modena | 2–3 | Unet E-Work Busto Arsizio | 25–22 | 17–25 | 18–25 | 25–21 | 13–15 | 98–108 | Report |
| 28 Oct | 20:30 | Saugella Team Monza | 1–3 | Savino Del Bene Scandicci | 25–15 | 17–25 | 17–25 | 14–25 | | 73–90 | Report |
| 28 Oct | 20:30 | SAB Volley Legnano | 1–3 | myCicero Volley Pesaro | 25–18 | 20–25 | 22–25 | 21–25 | | 88–93 | Report |
| 29 Oct | 17:00 | Foppapedretti Bergamo | 1–3 | Pomì Casalmaggiore | 12–25 | 19–25 | 25–21 | 23–25 | | 79–96 | Report |
| 29 Oct | 17:00 | Il Bisonte Firenze | 0–3 | Igor Gorgonzola Novara | 14–25 | 23–25 | 13–25 | | | 50–75 | Report |
| 29 Oct | 17:00 | Lardini Filottrano | 0–3 | Imoco Volley Conegliano | 15–25 | 24–26 | 16–25 | | | 55–76 | Report |

Round 4

| Date | Time | | Score | | Set 1 | Set 2 | Set 3 | Set 4 | Set 5 | Total | Report |
|---|---|---|---|---|---|---|---|---|---|---|---|
| 4 Nov | 20:30 | Pomì Casalmaggiore | 1–3 | Saugella Team Monza | 19–25 | 25–20 | 21–25 | 13–25 | | 78–95 | Report |
| 4 Nov | 20:30 | Unet E-Work Busto Arsizio | 3–1 | Foppapedretti Bergamo | 25–14 | 31–33 | 25–11 | 25–16 | | 106–74 | Report |
| 5 Nov | 17:00 | Imoco Volley Conegliano | 3–0 | SAB Volley Legnano | 25–20 | 25–20 | 25–22 | | | 75–62 | Report |
| 5 Nov | 17:00 | Igor Gorgonzola Novara | 3–1 | Lardini Filottrano | 19–25 | 25–15 | 25–22 | 25–19 | | 94–81 | Report |
| 5 Nov | 17:00 | myCicero Volley Pesaro | 2–3 | Liu Jo Nordmeccanica Modena | 25–27 | 25–20 | 22–25 | 25–23 | 12–15 | 109–110 | Report |
| 5 Nov | 19:30 | Il Bisonte Firenze | 0–3 | Savino Del Bene Scandicci | 14–25 | 16–25 | 14–25 | | | 44–75 | Report |

Round 5

| Date | Time | | Score | | Set 1 | Set 2 | Set 3 | Set 4 | Set 5 | Total | Report |
|---|---|---|---|---|---|---|---|---|---|---|---|
| 11 Nov | 21:00 | SAB Volley Legnano | 3–1 | Il Bisonte Firenze | 25–20 | 25–23 | 17–25 | 30–28 | | 97–96 | Report |
| 12 Nov | 17:00 | Pomì Casalmaggiore | 0–3 | myCicero Volley Pesaro | 25–27 | 23–25 | 13–25 | | | 61–77 | Report |
| 12 Nov | 17:00 | Savino Del Bene Scandicci | 3–0 | Lardini Filottrano | 25–17 | 25–18 | 25–19 | | | 75–54 | Report |
| 12 Nov | 17:00 | Saugella Team Monza | 1–3 | Unet E-Work Busto Arsizio | 23–25 | 25–12 | 20–25 | 21–25 | | 89–87 | Report |
| 15 Nov | 20:30 | Foppapedretti Bergamo | 1–3 | Imoco Volley Conegliano | 18–25 | 25–22 | 17–25 | 19–25 | | 79–97 | Report |
| 15 Nov | 20:30 | Liu Jo Nordmeccanica Modena | 0–3 | Igor Gorgonzola Novara | 21–25 | 20–25 | 21–25 | | | 62–75 | Report |

Round 6

| Date | Time | | Score | | Set 1 | Set 2 | Set 3 | Set 4 | Set 5 | Total | Report |
|---|---|---|---|---|---|---|---|---|---|---|---|
| 18 Nov | 20:45 | Imoco Volley Conegliano | 3–0 | Saugella Team Monza | 25–18 | 25–13 | 25–20 | | | 75–51 | Report |
| 19 Nov | 17:00 | Igor Gorgonzola Novara | 3–0 | Foppapedretti Bergamo | 25–18 | 25–16 | 25–22 | | | 75–56 | Report |
| 19 Nov | 17:00 | Unet E-Work Busto Arsizio | 3–0 | SAB Volley Legnano | 30–28 | 25–9 | 25–15 | | | 80–52 | Report |
| 19 Nov | 17:00 | Il Bisonte Firenze | 3–2 | Pomì Casalmaggiore | 19–25 | 25–27 | 25–17 | 25–22 | 15–11 | 109–102 | Report |
| 19 Nov | 17:00 | Lardini Filottrano | 0–3 | Liu Jo Nordmeccanica Modena | 18–25 | 17–25 | 23–25 | | | 58–75 | Report |
| 19 Nov | 17:00 | myCicero Volley Pesaro | 2–3 | Savino Del Bene Scandicci | 25–23 | 20–25 | 12–25 | 25–18 | 10–15 | 92–106 | Report |

Round 7

| Date | Time | | Score | | Set 1 | Set 2 | Set 3 | Set 4 | Set 5 | Total | Report |
|---|---|---|---|---|---|---|---|---|---|---|---|
| 22 Nov | 20:30 | Pomì Casalmaggiore | 3–0 | Lardini Filottrano | 25–14 | 25–15 | 25–20 | | | 75–49 | Report |
| 22 Nov | 20:30 | Foppapedretti Bergamo | 3–2 | Il Bisonte Firenze | 23–25 | 27–25 | 27–25 | 19–25 | 15–13 | 111–113 | Report |
| 22 Nov | 20:30 | Liu Jo Nordmeccanica Modena | 3–2 | SAB Volley Legnano | 25–18 | 19–25 | 26–28 | 25–20 | 15–10 | 110–101 | Report |
| 22 Nov | 20:30 | Savino Del Bene Scandicci | 0–3 | Igor Gorgonzola Novara | 18–25 | 25–27 | 21–25 | | | 64–77 | Report |
| 22 Nov | 20:30 | Unet E-Work Busto Arsizio | 2–3 | Imoco Volley Conegliano | 24–26 | 17–25 | 25–23 | 26–24 | 11–15 | 103–113 | Report |
| 22 Nov | 20:30 | Saugella Team Monza | 2–3 | myCicero Volley Pesaro | 23–25 | 19–25 | 25–22 | 25–22 | 12–15 | 104–109 | Report |

Round 8

| Date | Time | | Score | | Set 1 | Set 2 | Set 3 | Set 4 | Set 5 | Total | Report |
|---|---|---|---|---|---|---|---|---|---|---|---|
| 25 Nov | 20:30 | Igor Gorgonzola Novara | 3–2 | Pomì Casalmaggiore | 24–26 | 20–25 | 25–23 | 25–20 | 16–14 | 110–108 | Report |
| 26 Nov | 17:00 | Imoco Volley Conegliano | 2–3 | Liu Jo Nordmeccanica Modena | 21–25 | 21–25 | 25–15 | 25–9 | 12–15 | 104–89 | Report |
| 26 Nov | 17:00 | Lardini Filottrano | 1–3 | Saugella Team Monza | 25–15 | 20–25 | 17–25 | 20–25 | | 82–90 | Report |
| 26 Nov | 17:00 | myCicero Volley Pesaro | 3–0 | Foppapedretti Bergamo | 25–17 | 25–19 | 25–19 | | | 75–55 | Report |
| 26 Nov | 17:00 | SAB Volley Legnano | 0–3 | Savino Del Bene Scandicci | 13–25 | 16–25 | 22–25 | | | 51–75 | Report |
| 27 Nov | 20:30 | Il Bisonte Firenze | 2–3 | Unet E-Work Busto Arsizio | 25–14 | 16–25 | 22–25 | 25–23 | 11–15 | 99–102 | Report |

Round 9

| Date | Time | | Score | | Set 1 | Set 2 | Set 3 | Set 4 | Set 5 | Total | Report |
|---|---|---|---|---|---|---|---|---|---|---|---|
| 2 Dec | 20:30 | Foppapedretti Bergamo | 3–1 | Lardini Filottrano | 24–26 | 25–22 | 25–19 | 25–20 | | 99–87 | Report |
| 3 Dec | 17:00 | Liu Jo Nordmeccanica Modena | 1–3 | Il Bisonte Firenze | 21–25 | 12–25 | 25–19 | 17–25 | | 75–94 | Report |
| 3 Dec | 17:00 | Savino Del Bene Scandicci | 1–3 | Imoco Volley Conegliano | 26–24 | 22–25 | 22–25 | 23–25 | | 93–99 | Report |
| 3 Dec | 17:00 | Unet E-Work Busto Arsizio | 3–0 | myCicero Volley Pesaro | 25–20 | 25–18 | 26–24 | | | 76–62 | Report |
| 3 Dec | 17:00 | Saugella Team Monza | 3–2 | Igor Gorgonzola Novara | 25–23 | 25–27 | 21–25 | 27–25 | 16–14 | 114–114 | Report |
| 3 Dec | 17:00 | SAB Volley Legnano | 3–2 | Pomì Casalmaggiore | 18–25 | 25–18 | 15–25 | 25–23 | 23–21 | 106–112 | Report |

Round 10

| Date | Time | | Score | | Set 1 | Set 2 | Set 3 | Set 4 | Set 5 | Total | Report |
|---|---|---|---|---|---|---|---|---|---|---|---|
| 8 Dec | 16:00 | Pomì Casalmaggiore | 2–3 | Unet E-Work Busto Arsizio | 19–25 | 25–17 | 25–17 | 19–25 | 10–15 | 98–99 | Report |
| 9 Dec | 20:30 | Igor Gorgonzola Novara | 2–3 | Imoco Volley Conegliano | 25–20 | 19–25 | 25–16 | 23–25 | 11–15 | 103–101 | Report |
| 10 Dec | 17:00 | Savino Del Bene Scandicci | 3–2 | Foppapedretti Bergamo | 25–16 | 26–28 | 23–25 | 25–18 | 15–10 | 114–97 | Report |
| 10 Dec | 17:00 | Saugella Team Monza | 2–3 | Liu Jo Nordmeccanica Modena | 21–25 | 29–31 | 25–20 | 25–20 | 11–15 | 111–111 | Report |
| 10 Dec | 17:00 | Lardini Filottrano | 2–3 | SAB Volley Legnano | 25–20 | 25–16 | 25–27 | 23–25 | 10–15 | 108–103 | Report |
| 10 Dec | 17:00 | myCicero Volley Pesaro | 3–2 | Il Bisonte Firenze | 25–17 | 25–23 | 20–25 | 19–25 | 15–6 | 104–96 | Report |

Round 11

| Date | Time | | Score | | Set 1 | Set 2 | Set 3 | Set 4 | Set 5 | Total | Report |
|---|---|---|---|---|---|---|---|---|---|---|---|
| 16 Dec | 20:30 | Imoco Volley Conegliano | 3–0 | myCicero Volley Pesaro | 25–23 | 25–19 | 25–19 | | | 75–61 | Report |
| 16 Dec | 20:30 | Unet E-Work Busto Arsizio | 2–3 | Savino Del Bene Scandicci | 25–16 | 14–25 | 26–24 | 24–26 | 9–15 | 98–106 | Report |
| 17 Dec | 17:00 | Foppapedretti Bergamo | 1–3 | Saugella Team Monza | 25–27 | 22–25 | 25–17 | 19–25 | | 91–94 | Report |
| 17 Dec | 17:00 | Liu Jo Nordmeccanica Modena | 3–1 | Pomì Casalmaggiore | 25–20 | 23–25 | 25–17 | 25–20 | | 98–82 | Report |
| 17 Dec | 17:00 | Il Bisonte Firenze | 3–0 | Lardini Filottrano | 25–18 | 25–23 | 25–21 | | | 75–62 | Report |
| 17 Dec | 17:00 | SAB Volley Legnano | 0–3 | Igor Gorgonzola Novara | 25–27 | 21–25 | 16–25 | | | 62–77 | Report |

Round 12

| Date | Time | | Score | | Set 1 | Set 2 | Set 3 | Set 4 | Set 5 | Total | Report |
|---|---|---|---|---|---|---|---|---|---|---|---|
| 26 Dec | 16:00 | myCicero Volley Pesaro | 3–1 | Lardini Filottrano | 23–25 | 25–14 | 25–18 | 25–23 | | 98–80 | Report |
| 26 Dec | 17:00 | Imoco Volley Conegliano | 3–1 | Pomì Casalmaggiore | 25–16 | 24–26 | 25–21 | 25–14 | | 99–77 | Report |
| 26 Dec | 17:00 | Unet E-Work Busto Arsizio | 0–3 | Igor Gorgonzola Novara | 22–25 | 20–25 | 24–26 | | | 66–76 | Report |
| 26 Dec | 17:00 | Savino Del Bene Scandicci | 3–0 | Liu Jo Nordmeccanica Modena | 25–23 | 25–14 | 25–19 | | | 75–56 | Report |
| 26 Dec | 17:00 | Saugella Team Monza | 3–0 | Il Bisonte Firenze | 25–20 | 25–20 | 25–15 | | | 75–55 | Report |
| 26 Dec | 17:00 | Foppapedretti Bergamo | 3–0 | SAB Volley Legnano | 25–20 | 25–19 | 25–23 | | | 75–62 | Report |

Round 13

| Date | Time | | Score | | Set 1 | Set 2 | Set 3 | Set 4 | Set 5 | Total | Report |
|---|---|---|---|---|---|---|---|---|---|---|---|
| 6 Jan | 20:30 | Pomì Casalmaggiore | 3–1 | Savino Del Bene Scandicci | 25–19 | 15–25 | 25–21 | 25–18 | | 90–83 | Report |
| 7 Jan | 17:00 | Il Bisonte Firenze | 1–3 | Imoco Volley Conegliano | 25–22 | 11–25 | 23–25 | 12–25 | | 71–97 | Report |
| 7 Jan | 17:00 | Liu Jo Nordmeccanica Modena | 3–0 | Foppapedretti Bergamo | 25–22 | 31–29 | 25–18 | | | 81–69 | Report |
| 7 Jan | 17:00 | Lardini Filottrano | 3–2 | Unet E-Work Busto Arsizio | 19–25 | 25–19 | 26–24 | 17–25 | 15–10 | 102–103 | Report |
| 7 Jan | 17:00 | SAB Volley Legnano | 0–3 | Saugella Team Monza | 18–25 | 20–25 | 13–25 | | | 51–75 | Report |
| 7 Jan | 17:00 | Igor Gorgonzola Novara | 3–2 | myCicero Volley Pesaro | 25–23 | 27–25 | 22–25 | 19–25 | 15–13 | 108–111 | Report |

Round 14

| Date | Time | | Score | | Set 1 | Set 2 | Set 3 | Set 4 | Set 5 | Total | Report |
|---|---|---|---|---|---|---|---|---|---|---|---|
| 13 Jan | 20:30 | Unet E-Work Busto Arsizio | 3–1 | Liu Jo Nordmeccanica Modena | 25–18 | 23–25 | 25–18 | 25–20 | | 98–81 | Report |
| 14 Jan | 17:00 | Pomì Casalmaggiore | 2–3 | Foppapedretti Bergamo | 25–19 | 19–25 | 19–25 | 25–22 | 10–15 | 98–106 | Report |
| 14 Jan | 17:00 | Igor Gorgonzola Novara | 3–0 | Il Bisonte Firenze | 25–19 | 25–16 | 25–22 | | | 75–57 | Report |
| 14 Jan | 17:00 | Savino Del Bene Scandicci | 3–1 | Saugella Team Monza | 16–25 | 25–21 | 25–23 | 25–20 | | 91–89 | Report |
| 14 Jan | 17:00 | Imoco Volley Conegliano | 3–0 | Lardini Filottrano | 25–19 | 25–19 | 28–26 | | | 78–64 | Report |
| 14 Jan | 17:00 | myCicero Volley Pesaro | 3–0 | SAB Volley Legnano | 25–15 | 25–21 | 25–13 | | | 75–49 | Report |

Round 15

| Date | Time | | Score | | Set 1 | Set 2 | Set 3 | Set 4 | Set 5 | Total | Report |
|---|---|---|---|---|---|---|---|---|---|---|---|
| 17 Jan | 20:30 | SAB Volley Legnano | 0–3 | Imoco Volley Conegliano | 20–25 | 11–25 | 15–25 | | | 46–75 | Report |
| 17 Jan | 20:30 | Saugella Team Monza | 3–1 | Pomì Casalmaggiore | 25–20 | 25–18 | 17–25 | 25–20 | | 92–83 | Report |
| 17 Jan | 20:30 | Lardini Filottrano | 3–2 | Igor Gorgonzola Novara | 25–21 | 25–22 | 24–26 | 15–25 | 17–15 | 106–109 | Report |
| 17 Jan | 20:30 | Bergamo | 3–2 | Unet E-Work Busto Arsizio | 21–25 | 21–25 | 25–17 | 25–22 | 15–10 | 107–99 | Report |
| 17 Jan | 20:30 | Liu Jo Nordmeccanica Modena | 3–0 | myCicero Volley Pesaro | 25–13 | 25–15 | 25–21 | | | 75–49 | Report |
| 18 Jan | 20:30 | Savino Del Bene Scandicci | 3–0 | Il Bisonte Firenze | 25–21 | 25–23 | 25–20 | | | 75–64 | Report |

Round 16

| Date | Time | | Score | | Set 1 | Set 2 | Set 3 | Set 4 | Set 5 | Total | Report |
|---|---|---|---|---|---|---|---|---|---|---|---|
| 20 Jan | 20:30 | myCicero Volley Pesaro | 3–1 | Pomì Casalmaggiore | 19–25 | 25–23 | 25–16 | 25–21 | | 94–85 | Report |
| 21 Jan | 17:00 | Imoco Volley Conegliano | 3–1 | Foppapedretti Bergamo | 25–22 | 24–26 | 25–13 | 25–15 | | 99–76 | Report |
| 21 Jan | 17:00 | Igor Gorgonzola Novara | 3–0 | Liu Jo Nordmeccanica Modena | 25–22 | 29–27 | 25–23 | | | 79–72 | Report |
| 21 Jan | 17:00 | Lardini Filottrano | 1–3 | Savino Del Bene Scandicci | 25–22 | 18–25 | 15–25 | 17–25 | | 75–97 | Report |
| 21 Jan | 17:00 | Unet E-Work Busto Arsizio | 3–0 | Saugella Team Monza | 25–23 | 26–24 | 25–18 | | | 76–65 | Report |
| 21 Jan | 17:00 | Il Bisonte Firenze | 3–0 | SAB Volley Legnano | 25–19 | 25–18 | 25–22 | | | 75–59 | Report |

Round 17

| Date | Time | | Score | | Set 1 | Set 2 | Set 3 | Set 4 | Set 5 | Total | Report |
|---|---|---|---|---|---|---|---|---|---|---|---|
| 27 Jan | 20:30 | SAB Volley Legnano | 3–1 | Unet E-Work Busto Arsizio | 25–22 | 25–19 | 21–25 | 25–21 | | 96–87 | Report |
| 27 Jan | 20:30 | Pomì Casalmaggiore | 3–1 | Il Bisonte Firenze | 25–22 | 26–24 | 16–25 | 25–17 | | 92–88 | Report |
| 28 Jan | 17:00 | Saugella Team Monza | 3–1 | Imoco Volley Conegliano | 25–18 | 25–19 | 21–25 | 25–22 | | 96–84 | Report |
| 28 Jan | 17:00 | Foppapedretti Bergamo | 3–2 | Igor Gorgonzola Novara | 25–23 | 19–25 | 28–26 | 22–25 | 15–11 | 109–110 | Report |
| 28 Jan | 17:00 | Liu Jo Nordmeccanica Modena | 3–0 | Lardini Filottrano | 25–21 | 25–23 | 25–22 | | | 75–66 | Report |
| 28 Jan | 17:00 | Savino Del Bene Scandicci | 3–0 | myCicero Volley Pesaro | 25–20 | 25–13 | 25–13 | | | 75–46 | Report |

Round 18

| Date | Time | | Score | | Set 1 | Set 2 | Set 3 | Set 4 | Set 5 | Total | Report |
|---|---|---|---|---|---|---|---|---|---|---|---|
| 3 Feb | 18:00 | Igor Gorgonzola Novara | 3–0 | Savino Del Bene Scandicci | 25–19 | 27–25 | 25–19 | | | 77–63 | Report |
| 3 Feb | 20:30 | Il Bisonte Firenze | 3–0 | Foppapedretti Bergamo | 29–27 | 30–28 | 26–24 | | | 85–79 | Report |
| 4 Feb | 17:00 | Lardini Filottrano | 3–1 | Pomì Casalmaggiore | 25–21 | 25–23 | 22–25 | 25–20 | | 97–89 | Report |
| 4 Feb | 17:00 | SAB Volley Legnano | 2–3 | Liu Jo Nordmeccanica Modena | 25–22 | 29–27 | 18–25 | 13–25 | 15–17 | 100–116 | Report |
| 4 Feb | 17:00 | Imoco Volley Conegliano | 3–0 | Unet E-Work Busto Arsizio | 25–19 | 25–17 | 25–17 | | | 75–53 | Report |
| 4 Feb | 17:00 | myCicero Volley Pesaro | 2–3 | Saugella Team Monza | 17–25 | 25–16 | 23–25 | 25–22 | 10–15 | 100–103 | Report |

Round 19

| Date | Time | | Score | | Set 1 | Set 2 | Set 3 | Set 4 | Set 5 | Total | Report |
|---|---|---|---|---|---|---|---|---|---|---|---|
| 10 Feb | 20:30 | Saugella Team Monza | 3–1 | Lardini Filottrano | 25–9 | 18–25 | 25–22 | 25–23 | | 93–79 | Report |
| 10 Feb | 20:30 | Liu Jo Nordmeccanica Modena | 2–3 | Imoco Volley Conegliano | 26–24 | 10–25 | 25–22 | 19–25 | 13–15 | 93–111 | Report |
| 10 Feb | 20:30 | Pomì Casalmaggiore | 3–1 | Igor Gorgonzola Novara | 25–23 | 30–28 | 15–25 | 25–22 | | 95–98 | Report |
| 11 Feb | 17:00 | Unet E-Work Busto Arsizio | 3–1 | Il Bisonte Firenze | 25–16 | 25–22 | 20–25 | 25–18 | | 95–81 | Report |
| 11 Feb | 17:00 | Foppapedretti Bergamo | 3–0 | myCicero Volley Pesaro | 25–19 | 26–24 | 25–23 | | | 76–66 | Report |
| 11 Feb | 17:00 | Savino Del Bene Scandicci | 3–0 | SAB Volley Legnano | 25–14 | 25–13 | 25–17 | | | 75–44 | Report |

Round 20

| Date | Time | | Score | | Set 1 | Set 2 | Set 3 | Set 4 | Set 5 | Total | Report |
|---|---|---|---|---|---|---|---|---|---|---|---|
| 24 Feb | 20:30 | Igor Gorgonzola Novara | 3–1 | Saugella Team Monza | 25–16 | 25–15 | 22–25 | 25–19 | | 97–75 | Report |
| 25 Feb | 17:00 | Lardini Filottrano | 3–1 | Foppapedretti Bergamo | 16–25 | 25–20 | 26–24 | 25–17 | | 92–86 | Report |
| 25 Feb | 17:00 | Il Bisonte Firenze | 3–0 | Liu Jo Nordmeccanica Modena | 27–25 | 25–18 | 25–23 | | | 77–66 | Report |
| 25 Feb | 17:00 | Imoco Volley Conegliano | 0–3 | Savino Del Bene Scandicci | 14–25 | 22–25 | 20–25 | | | 56–75 | Report |
| 25 Feb | 17:00 | myCicero Volley Pesaro | 3–0 | Unet E-Work Busto Arsizio | 25–22 | 25–18 | 25–23 | | | 75–63 | Report |
| 25 Feb | 17:00 | Pomì Casalmaggiore | 3–2 | SAB Volley Legnano | 25–18 | 15–25 | 25–21 | 23–25 | 21–19 | 109–108 | Report |

Round 21

| Date | Time | | Score | | Set 1 | Set 2 | Set 3 | Set 4 | Set 5 | Total | Report |
|---|---|---|---|---|---|---|---|---|---|---|---|
| 3 Mar | 20:30 | Unet E-Work Busto Arsizio | 3–1 | Pomì Casalmaggiore | 22–25 | 25–14 | 25–15 | 25–18 | | 97–72 | Report |
| 4 Mar | 17:00 | Imoco Volley Conegliano | 2–3 | Igor Gorgonzola Novara | 21–25 | 22–25 | 25–19 | 25–16 | 11–15 | 104–100 | Report |
| 4 Mar | 17:00 | Foppapedretti Bergamo | 1–3 | Savino Del Bene Scandicci | 22–25 | 25–23 | 19–25 | 17–25 | | 83–98 | Report |
| 4 Mar | 17:00 | Liu Jo Nordmeccanica Modena | 2–3 | Saugella Team Monza | 25–23 | 25–19 | 21–25 | 21–25 | 12–15 | 104–107 | Report |
| 4 Mar | 17:00 | SAB Volley Legnano | 1–3 | Lardini Filottrano | 25–18 | 22–25 | 23–25 | 20–25 | | 90–93 | Report |
| 4 Mar | 17:00 | Il Bisonte Firenze | 3–0 | myCicero Volley Pesaro | 25–16 | 25–18 | 25–20 | | | 75–54 | Report |

Round 22

| Date | Time | | Score | | Set 1 | Set 2 | Set 3 | Set 4 | Set 5 | Total | Report |
|---|---|---|---|---|---|---|---|---|---|---|---|
| 10 Mar | 20:30 | myCicero Volley Pesaro | 3–1 | Imoco Volley Conegliano | 19–25 | 26–24 | 25–21 | 25–20 | | 95–90 | Report |
| 10 Mar | 20:30 | Saugella Team Monza | 3–2 | Foppapedretti Bergamo | 21–25 | 25–21 | 25–23 | 19–25 | 15–13 | 105–107 | Report |
| 10 Mar | 20:30 | Pomì Casalmaggiore | 2–3 | Liu Jo Nordmeccanica Modena | 25–17 | 25–20 | 21–25 | 24–26 | 10–15 | 105–103 | Report |
| 10 Mar | 20:30 | Savino Del Bene Scandicci | 3–2 | Unet E-Work Busto Arsizio | 24–26 | 20–25 | 25–13 | 26–24 | 15–10 | 110–98 | Report |
| 10 Mar | 20:30 | Lardini Filottrano | 3–2 | Il Bisonte Firenze | 25–18 | 20–25 | 28–30 | 25–22 | 15–13 | 113–108 | Report |
| 10 Mar | 20:30 | Igor Gorgonzola Novara | 3–0 | SAB Volley Legnano | 25–20 | 25–16 | 25–21 | | | 75–57 | Report |

== Playoffs ==
=== Bracket ===
Quarterfinals
1 | Novara | 3 | 3 | X
8 | Firenze | 1 | 1 | X
5 | Monza | 3 | 1 | 0
4 | Busto Arsizio | 1 | 3 | 3
3 | Conegliano | 3 | 3 | X
6 | Modena | 0 | 1 | X
7 | Pesaro | 0 | 1 | X
2 | Scandicci | 3 | 3 | X

Semifinals
1 | Novara | 3 | 3 | 3 | X | X
4 | Busto Arsizio | 0 | 0 | 0 | X | X
3 | Conegliano | 3 | 3 | 3 | X | X
2 | Scandicci | 0 | 1 | 0 | X | X

Finals
1 | Novara | 3 | 2 | 0 | 1 | X
3 | Conegliano | 0 | 3 | 3 | 3 | X

=== Quarterfinals ===
==== (1) Igor Gorgonzola Novara vs. (8) Il Bisonte Firenze ====
| Date | Time | | Score | | Set 1 | Set 2 | Set 3 | Set 4 | Set 5 | Total | Report |
|---|---|---|---|---|---|---|---|---|---|---|---|
| 17 Mar | 20:30 | Igor Gorgonzola Novara | 3–1 | Il Bisonte Firenze | 25–20 | 25–15 | 24–26 | 25–16 | | 99–77 | Report |
| 25 Mar | 17:00 | Il Bisonte Firenze | 1–3 | Igor Gorgonzola Novara | 25–17 | 23–25 | 22–25 | 22–25 | | 92–92 | Report |

Igor Gorgonzola Novara wins series, 2–0.

==== (4) Unet E-Work Busto Arsizio vs. (5) Saugella Team Monza ====
| Date | Time | | Score | | Set 1 | Set 2 | Set 3 | Set 4 | Set 5 | Total | Report |
|---|---|---|---|---|---|---|---|---|---|---|---|
| 17 Mar | 20:30 | Unet E-Work Busto Arsizio | 1–3 | Saugella Team Monza | 25–19 | 19–25 | 23–25 | 23–25 | | 90–94 | Report |
| 25 Mar | 17:00 | Saugella Team Monza | 1–3 | Unet E-Work Busto Arsizio | 10–25 | 25–17 | 15–25 | 18–25 | | 68–92 | Report |
| 28 Mar | 20:30 | Unet E-Work Busto Arsizio | 3–0 | Saugella Team Monza | 25–18 | 25–19 | 25–17 | | | 75–54 | Report |

Unet E-Work Busto Arsizio wins series, 2–1.

==== (3) Imoco Volley Conegliano vs. (6) Liu Jo Nordmeccanica Modena ====
| Date | Time | | Score | | Set 1 | Set 2 | Set 3 | Set 4 | Set 5 | Total | Report |
|---|---|---|---|---|---|---|---|---|---|---|---|
| 18 Mar | 17:00 | Imoco Volley Conegliano | 3–0 | Liu Jo Nordmeccanica Modena | 25–16 | 25–16 | 25–16 | | | 75–48 | Report |
| 24 Mar | 17:00 | Liu Jo Nordmeccanica Modena | 1–3 | Imoco Volley Conegliano | 19–25 | 23–25 | 25–23 | 20–25 | | 87–98 | Report |

Imoco Volley Conegliano wins series, 2–0.

==== (2) Savino Del Bene Scandicci vs. (7) myCicero Volley Pesaro ====
| Date | Time | | Score | | Set 1 | Set 2 | Set 3 | Set 4 | Set 5 | Total | Report |
|---|---|---|---|---|---|---|---|---|---|---|---|
| 18 Mar | 17:00 | Savino Del Bene Scandicci | 3–0 | myCicero Volley Pesaro | 25–15 | 25–21 | 25–21 | | | 75–57 | Report |
| 24 Mar | 20:30 | myCicero Volley Pesaro | 1–3 | Savino Del Bene Scandicci | 25–23 | 20–25 | 23–25 | 19–25 | | 87–98 | Report |

Savino Del Bene Scandicci wins series, 2–0.

=== Semifinals ===
==== (1) Igor Gorgonzola Novara vs. (4) Unet E-Work Busto Arsizio ====
| Date | Time | | Score | | Set 1 | Set 2 | Set 3 | Set 4 | Set 5 | Total | Report |
|---|---|---|---|---|---|---|---|---|---|---|---|
| 2 Apr | 17:00 | Igor Gorgonzola Novara | 3–0 | Unet E-Work Busto Arsizio | 25–21 | 25–19 | 25–16 | | | 75–56 | Report |
| 8 Apr | 17:00 | Igor Gorgonzola Novara | 3–0 | Unet E-Work Busto Arsizio | 25–19 | 25–18 | 25–22 | | | 75–59 | Report |
| 11 Apr | 20:30 | Unet E-Work Busto Arsizio | 0–3 | Igor Gorgonzola Novara | 20–25 | 15–25 | 24–26 | | | 59–76 | Report |

Igor Gorgonzola Novara wins series, 3–0.

==== (2) Savino Del Bene Scandicci vs. (3) Imoco Volley Conegliano ====
| Date | Time | | Score | | Set 1 | Set 2 | Set 3 | Set 4 | Set 5 | Total | Report |
|---|---|---|---|---|---|---|---|---|---|---|---|
| 31 Mar | 20:30 | Savino Del Bene Scandicci | 0–3 | Imoco Volley Conegliano | 23–25 | 23–25 | 20–25 | | | 66–75 | Report |
| 7 Apr | 20:30 | Imoco Volley Conegliano | 3–1 | Savino Del Bene Scandicci | 17–25 | 25–19 | 25–16 | 25–19 | | 92–79 | Report |
| 10 Apr | 20:30 | Savino Del Bene Scandicci | 0–3 | Imoco Volley Conegliano | 22–25 | 23–25 | 16–25 | | | 61–75 | Report |

Imoco Volley Conegliano wins series, 3–0.

=== Finals ===
==== (1) Igor Gorgonzola Novara vs. (3) Imoco Volley Conegliano ====
| Date | Time | | Score | | Set 1 | Set 2 | Set 3 | Set 4 | Set 5 | Total | Report |
|---|---|---|---|---|---|---|---|---|---|---|---|
| 18 Apr | 20:30 | Igor Gorgonzola Novara | 3–0 | Imoco Volley Conegliano | 25–23 | 25–20 | 25–21 | | | 75–64 | Report |
| 21 Apr | 20:30 | Imoco Volley Conegliano | 3–2 | Igor Gorgonzola Novara | 30–28 | 25–15 | 23–25 | 20–25 | 15–13 | 113–106 | Report |
| 25 Apr | 17:00 | Igor Gorgonzola Novara | 0–3 | Imoco Volley Conegliano | 12–25 | 19–25 | 19–25 | | | 50–75 | Report |
| 29 Apr | 18:00 | Imoco Volley Conegliano | 3–1 | Igor Gorgonzola Novara | 28–26 | 25–21 | 22–25 | 25–12 | | 100–84 | Report |

Imoco Volley Conegliano wins series, 3–1.

== Final standings ==
| Rank | Team |
|---|---|
| 1st place, gold medalist(s) | Imoco Volley Conegliano |
| 2nd place, silver medalist(s) | Igor Gorgonzola Novara |
| 3rd place, bronze medalist(s) | Savino Del Bene Scandicci |
| 4 | Unet E-Work Busto Arsizio |
| 5 | Saugella Team Monza |
| 6 | Liu Jo Nordmeccanica Modena |
| 7 | myCicero Volley Pesaro |
| 8 | Il Bisonte Firenze |
| 9 | Pomì Casalmaggiore |
| 10 | Foppapedretti Bergamo |
| 11 | Lardini Filottrano |
| 12 | SAB Volley Legnano |

2018 Italian champions
Imoco Volley Conegliano
2nd title

Samantha Bricio, Silvia Fiori, Robin de Kruijf, Elisa Cella, Raphaela Folie, Megan Easy, Laura Melandri, Monica De Gennaro, Anna Danesi, Athina Papafotiou, Samanta Fabris, Joanna Wołosz (C), Kimberly Hill, Anna Nicoletti, Simone Lee, Marta Bechis
Head coach
Daniele Santarelli
