= Caroline Wensink =

Dutch volleyball player (born 1984)

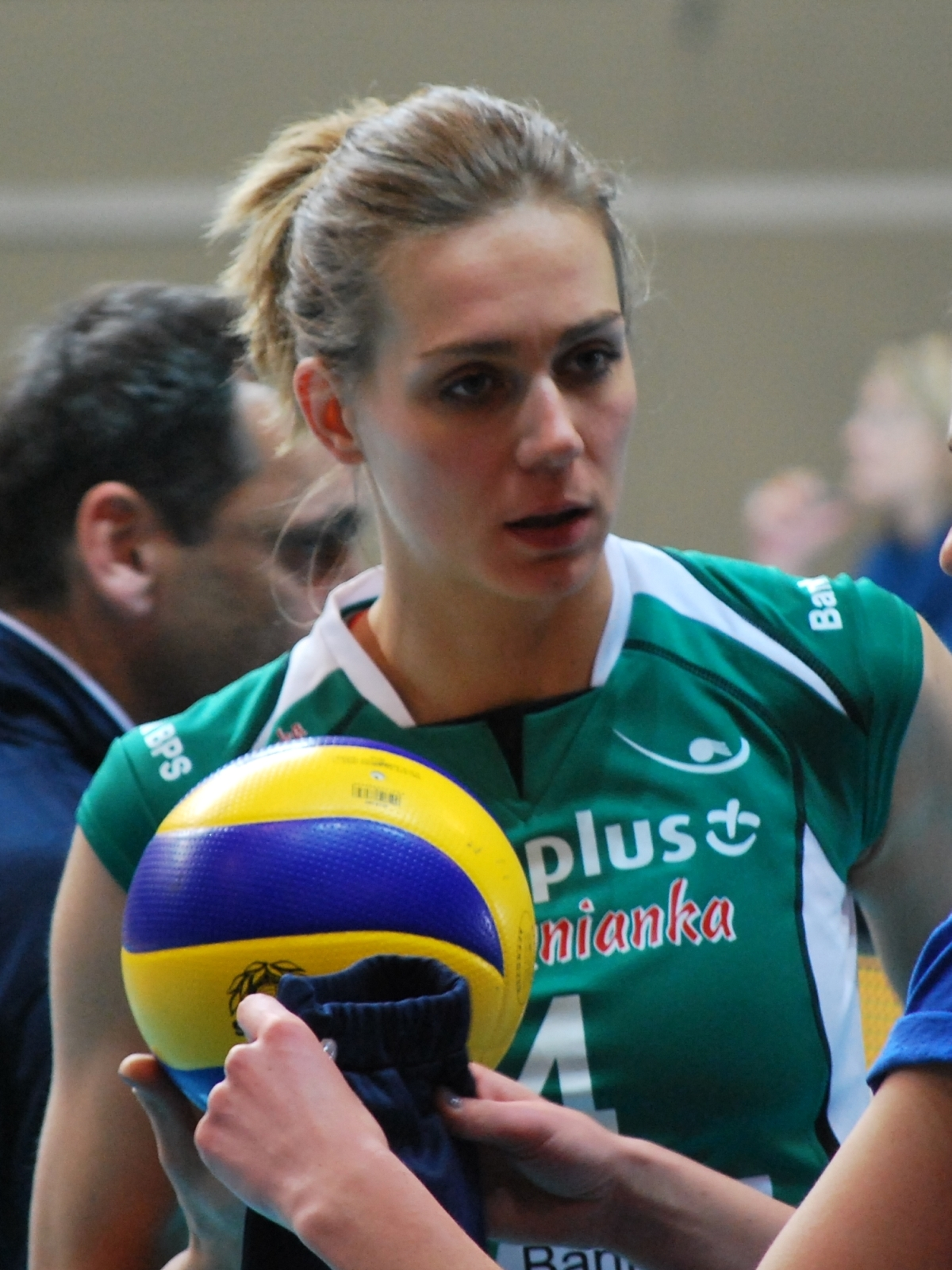

Medal record

Women's volleyball

Representing the Netherlands

European Championship
| Silver medal – second place | 2009 Poland | Team competition |

FIVB World Grand Prix
| Gold medal – first place | 2007 Ningbo | Team competition |

Caroline Wensink (born 4 August 1984 in Enschede, Overijssel) is a volleyball player from the Netherlands, who plays as a middle-blocker. She was a member of the Dutch National Women's Team that won the gold medal at the 2007 FIVB World Grand Prix in Ningbo, PR China.

Caroline won the Best Blocker award in the 2012 European League, as her team ended in 4th place.

Wensink is the cousin of Judith Pietersen, with whom she has also played in the Dutch national team.

== Awards ==
=== Individuals ===
- 2012 European League "Best Blocker"
