= Volley Millenium Brescia =

Italian women's volleyball club

- Full name: Volley Millenium Brescia
- Founded: 1999
- Ground: PalaGeorge, Montichiari, Italy (Capacity: 4,000)
- Chairman: Roberto Catania
- Head coach: Matteo Solforati
- League: FIPAV Women's Serie A1
- Website: Club home page

Uniforms
Home	Away

Volley Millenium Brescia is an Italian women's volleyball club based in Brescia and currently playing in the Serie A1.

== Previous names ==
Due to sponsorship, the club have competed under the following names:

- Millenium Brescia (1999–2017)
- Savallese Millenium Brescia (2017–2018)
- Banca Valsabbina Millenium Brescia (2018–2022)
- Valsabbina Millenium Brescia (2022–present)

== History ==
The club was established in 1999 and its teams (girls, youth, junior and senior) started participating in local and regional competitions. After a restructure process in 2006, the club adopted a more professional oriented model that allowed the first team to move from regional to national competitions. It reached Serie D (in 2008), Serie C (in 2010), Serie B2 (in 2011) and Serie B1 (in 2013). The club won the 2015–16 Serie B1 promotion playoff and made its debut in the Serie A2 the following season.

In 2018, Millenium Brescia finished the regular season of Serie A2 in first place and the club was promoted to Serie A1 for the 2018–2019 season. Brescia remained in the top league for three seasons, but in 2021 the club was relegated back to Serie A2. Millenium Brescia returned to Serie A1 in the 2026–2027 season after winning the play-off of the 2025–2026 Serie A2.

== Venue ==
The club played its home matches at the PalaMillenium (in Bagnolo Mella) until 2017, when ahead of the 2017–18 season it moved to the PalaGeorge (in Montichiari), which has a 4,000 spectators capacity.

== Team ==
2026–2027 Team
Number	Player	Position	Height (m)	Birth date
3	(Italy) Rossella Olivotto	Middle Blocker	1.89	27 April 1991 (age 35)
4	(Italy) Dalila Modestino	Middle Blocker	1.85	4 April 1998 (age 28)
5	(Croatia) Andrea Mihaljević	Opposite	1.85	21 February 2003 (age 23)
6	(Serbia) Anđelka Novosel	Outside Hitter	1.85	7 October 2002 (age 24)
8	(Italy) Caterina Schillkowski	Setter	1.84	7 June 2007 (age 19)
9	(Italy) Valentina Bartolucci	Setter	1.81	20 May 2003 (age 23)
10	(Italy) Beatrice Parrocchiale (c)	Libero	1.67	26 December 1995 (age 30)
11	(Serbia) Božica Marković	Middle Blocker	1.87	17 August 1997 (age 29)
12	(Italy) Rachele Nardelli	Outside Hitter	1.86	7 January 2001 (age 25)
13	(Italy) Paola Ruggieri	Libero	1.67	29 February 2008 (age 18)
16	(Italy) Giorgia Amoruso	Outside Hitter	1.85	18 May 2006 (age 20)
18	(Portugal) Júlia Kavalenka	Opposite	1.91	2 March 1999 (age 27)
19	(Bulgaria) Kalina Veneva	Outside Hitter	1.88	8 March 2009 (age 17)
23	(Ukraine) Oleksandra Bytsenko	Outside Hitter	1.93	23 November 1995 (age 30)

2025–2026 Team
Number	Player	Position	Height (m)	Birth date
2	(Italy) Arianna Vittorini	Outside Hitter	1.81	5 September 2002 (age 24)
3	(Italy) Rossella Olivotto	Middle Blocker	1.89	27 April 1991 (age 35)
4	(Italy) Dalila Modestino	Middle Blocker	1.85	4 April 1998 (age 28)
5	(Italy) Francesca Michieletto	Outside Hitter	1.84	10 September 1997 (age 29)
~~6~~	(Jamaica) ~~Mychael Vernon~~ (Note: Mychael Vernon left the team on 15 December 2025.)	~~Opposite~~	~~1.80~~	~~14 June 2002 (age 24)~~
7	(Italy) Lea Orlandi	Middle Blocker	1.82	7 August 2006 (age 20)
8	(Italy) Caterina Schillkowski	Setter	1.84	7 June 2007 (age 19)
10	(Italy) Beatrice Parrocchiale (c)	Libero	1.67	26 December 1995 (age 30)
11	(Italy) Vittoria Prandi	Setter	1.80	4 November 1994 (age 31)
12	(Latvia) Katrīna Struka	Opposite	1.87	18 April 2007 (age 19)
13	(Italy) Elena Arici	Libero	1.70	7 August 2007 (age 19)
16	(Italy) Giorgia Amoruso	Outside Hitter	1.85	18 May 2006 (age 20)
18	(Portugal) Júlia Kavalenka (Note: Júlia Kavalenka joined the team on 16 December 2025.)	Opposite	1.91	2 March 1999 (age 27)

2024–2025 Team
Number	Player	Position	Height (m)	Birth date
1	(Slovenia) Mija Šiftar	Outside Hitter	1.89	9 February 2006 (age 20)
2	(Italy) Silvia Romanin	Setter	1.92	27 February 2003 (age 23)
3	(Italy) Laura Franceschini	Middle Blocker	1.90	17 October 2006 (age 20)
4	(Italy) Francesca Trevisan (c)	Outside Hitter	1.80	22 September 1995 (age 31)
5	(Italy) Camilla Riccardi	Libero	1.60	5 April 2000 (age 26)
6	(Italy) Tiziana Veglia	Middle Blocker	1.83	13 September 1992 (age 34)
7	(Italy) Viola Tonello	Middle Blocker	1.84	3 January 1994 (age 32)
8	(Italy) Chiara Scacchetti	Setter	1.80	10 December 1995 (age 30)
~~9~~	(Italy) ~~Federica Stroppa~~ (Note: Federica Stroppa left the team on 15 January 2025.)	~~Opposite~~	~~1.82~~	~~9 February 1997 (age 29)~~
12	(France) Lara Davidović	Opposite	1.85	13 December 1997 (age 28)
13	(Italy) Aurora Pistolesi	Outside Hitter	1.82	3 June 1999 (age 27)
15	(Italy) Serena Scognamillo	Libero	1.70	24 February 2001 (age 25)
16	(Germany) Lara Berger (Note: Lara Berger joined the team on 16 January 2025.)	Opposite	1.96	2 November 2001 (age 24)
17	(Italy) Denise Meli	Middle Blocker	1.83	9 April 2001 (age 25)

2023–2024 Team
Number	Player	Position	Height (m)	Birth date
3	(Italy) Cristina Fiorio	Outside Hitter	1.80	18 March 1997 (age 29)
4	(Italy) Matilde Pinarello	Setter	1.81	1 February 2004 (age 22)
7	(Italy) Matilde Tagliani	Libero	1.62	13 June 2005 (age 21)
8	(Italy) Chiara Scacchetti	Setter	1.80	10 December 1995 (age 30)
9	(Italy) Alice Torcolacci	Middle Blocker	1.84	27 February 2000 (age 26)
10	(Italy) Alice Pamio (c)	Outside Hitter	1.81	15 January 1998 (age 28)
11	(Italy) Katarina Bulovic	Outside Hitter	1.88	19 January 2002 (age 24)
12	(Italy) Ylenia Pericati	Libero	1.74	22 March 1994 (age 32)
13	(Italy) Margherita Brandi	Middle Blocker	1.83	18 October 2002 (age 24)
15	(Israel) Polina Malik	Opposite	1.86	18 November 1998 (age 27)
16	(Italy) Maria Adelaide Babatunde	Middle Blocker	1.88	3 April 1998 (age 28)
17	(Italy) Francesca Pinetti	Outside Hitter	1.80	1 May 2000 (age 26)
18	(Italy) Sonia Ratti	Opposite	1.84	3 May 2001 (age 25)

2022–2023 Team
Number	Player	Position	Height (m)	Birth date
1	(Italy) Sophie Andrea Blasi	Libero	1.77	16 December 2002 (age 23)
2	(Italy) Bianca Orlandi	Outside Hitter	1.80	26 April 2003 (age 23)
5	(Italy) Jennifer Boldini (c)	Setter	1.87	6 April 1999 (age 27)
7	(Italy) Claudia Consoli	Middle Blocker	1.83	4 February 2002 (age 24)
8	(Italy) Alice Torcolacci	Middle Blocker	1.84	27 February 2000 (age 26)
9	(Croatia) Lea Cvetnić	Outside Hitter	1.86	2 February 1999 (age 27)
10	(Italy) Alice Pamio	Outside Hitter	1.81	15 January 1998 (age 28)
11	(Italy) Josephine Obossa	Opposite	1.83	20 May 1999 (age 27)
13	(Italy) Matilde Munarini	Middle Blocker	1.86	3 June 2004 (age 22)
15	(Italy) Serena Scognamillo	Libero	1.70	24 February 2001 (age 25)
16	(Italy) Aurora Zorzetto	Outside Hitter	1.83	1 February 2003 (age 23)
17	(Italy) Elena Foresi	Setter	1.81	6 July 2000 (age 26)
18	(Italy) Sonia Ratti	Opposite	1.84	3 May 2001 (age 25)

2021–2022 Team
Number	Player	Position	Height (m)	Birth date
1	(Italy) Rachele Morello	Setter	1.82	7 November 2000 (age 25)
3	(Italy) Beatrice Giroldi	Setter	1.70	3 April 1995 (age 31)
4	(Italy) Marika Bianchini (c)	Outside Hitter	1.78	23 April 1993 (age 33)
5	(Italy) Michela Ciarrocchi	Middle Blocker	1.84	16 December 1999 (age 26)
6	(Italy) Silvia Fondriest	Middle Blocker	1.88	29 December 1988 (age 37)
7	(Italy) Sophie Andrea Blasi	Outside Hitter	1.77	16 December 2002 (age 23)
8	(Italy) Giorgia Sironi	Opposite	1.85	24 February 1995 (age 31)
9	(Croatia) Lea Cvetnić	Outside Hitter	1.86	2 February 1999 (age 27)
10	(Italy) Emma Tenca	Libero	1.60	25 July 2005 (age 21)
12	(Italy) Rebecca Piva (Note: Rebecca Piva joined the team on 2 January 2022.)	Outside Hitter	1.86	1 May 2001 (age 25)
14	(Italy) Alice Tanase	Outside Hitter	1.83	25 May 2000 (age 26)
15	(Italy) Serena Scognamillo	Libero	1.70	24 February 2001 (age 25)
16	(Italy) Giulia Bartesaghi	Outside Hitter	1.87	5 September 1998 (age 28)
17	(Italy) Anna Caneva	Middle Blocker	1.87	18 March 1992 (age 34)

2020–2021 Team
Number	Player	Position	Height (m)	Birth date
2	(Italy) Chiara Sala	Libero	1.60	12 April 2003 (age 23)
3	(Italy) Marta Bechis	Setter	1.80	4 September 1989 (age 37)
5	(Italy) Giulia Angelina	Outside Hitter	1.92	26 February 1997 (age 29)
6	(Netherlands) Marrit Jasper	Outside Hitter	1.80	28 February 1996 (age 30)
7	(Italy) Ylenia Pericati	Libero	1.74	22 March 1994 (age 32)
9	(Croatia) Lea Cvetnić	Outside Hitter	1.86	2 February 1999 (age 27)
10	(Italy) Francesca Parlangeli	Libero	1.65	23 February 1990 (age 36)
11	(Italy) Ulrike Bridi	Setter	1.82	24 July 1998 (age 28)
12	(Italy) Federica Biganzoli	Outside Hitter	1.79	5 November 1987 (age 38)
13	(Germany) Saskia Hippe (Note: Saskia Hippe joined the team in early January 2021.)	Opposite	1.86	16 January 1991 (age 35)
14	(Italy) Alexandra Botezat	Middle Blocker	1.96	3 August 1998 (age 28)
15	(Italy) Beatrice Berti	Middle Blocker	1.93	12 January 1996 (age 30)
16	(Italy) Tiziana Veglia (c)	Middle Blocker	1.83	13 September 1992 (age 34)
~~17~~	(Italy) ~~Clara Decortes~~ (Note: Clara Decortes left the team on 14 December 2020.)	~~Opposite~~	~~1.83~~	~~7 March 1996 (age 30)~~
18	(Italy) Anna Nicoletti	Opposite	1.89	3 January 1996 (age 30)

2019–2020 Team
Number	Player	Position	Height (m)	Birth date
1	(Italy) Alice Degradi (Note: Alice Degradi joined the team on 8 January 2020.)	Outside Hitter	1.81	10 April 1996 (age 30)
~~2~~	(United States) ~~Veronica Jones-Perry~~ (Note: Veronica Jones-Perry left the team on 17 January 2020.)	~~Outside Hitter~~	~~1.83~~	~~20 January 1997 (age 29)~~
3	(Italy) Marta Bechis (Note: Marta Bechis joined the team on 8 January 2020.)	Setter	1.80	4 September 1989 (age 37)
4	(Spain) Jessica Rivero	Outside Hitter	1.81	15 March 1995 (age 31)
6	(Canada) Kelsey Veltman	Middle Blocker	1.89	2 April 1996 (age 30)
7	(United States) Symone Speech	Middle Blocker	1.91	29 May 1997 (age 29)
8	(Italy) Laura Saccomani	Outside Hitter	1.89	8 October 1991 (age 35)
9	(Italy) Camilla Mingardi	Opposite	1.86	19 October 1997 (age 29)
10	(Italy) Francesca Parlangeli	Libero	1.65	23 February 1990 (age 36)
11	(Italy) Ulrike Bridi	Setter	1.82	24 July 1998 (age 28)
12	(Italy) Federica Biganzoli	Outside Hitter	1.79	5 November 1987 (age 38)
13	(Italy) Monica Mazzoleni	Middle Blocker	1.88	10 December 1997 (age 28)
~~14~~	(Italy) ~~Valeria Caracuta~~ (Note: Valeria Caracuta left the team on 8 January 2020.)	~~Setter~~	~~1.73~~	~~14 December 1987 (age 38)~~
16	(Spain) Maria Segura	Outside Hitter	1.85	10 June 1992 (age 34)
17	(Italy) Marianna Fiocco	Middle Blocker	1.85	1 September 1994 (age 32)

2018–2019 Team
Number	Player	Position	Height (m)	Birth date
3	(Italy) Giulia Biava	Outside Hitter	1.78	19 December 1988 (age 37)
4	(Spain) Jessica Rivero	Outside Hitter	1.81	15 March 1995 (age 31)
5	(Italy) Maria Chiara Norgini	Libero	1.70	11 September 1998 (age 28)
6	(Italy) Miriana Manig	Setter	1.77	18 July 1998 (age 28)
7	(Italy) Isabella Di Iulio	Setter	1.75	26 November 1991 (age 34)
8	(Netherlands) Judith Pietersen	Outside Hitter	1.88	3 July 1989 (age 37)
9	(Italy) Francesca Villani	Outside Hitter	1.87	30 May 1995 (age 31)
10	(Italy) Francesca Parlangeli	Libero	1.65	23 February 1990 (age 36)
11	(United States) Haleigh Washington	Middle Blocker	1.92	22 September 1995 (age 31)
14	(Italy) Giulia Bartesaghi	Opposite	1.87	5 September 1998 (age 28)
15	(Italy) Anna Nicoletti	Opposite	1.89	3 January 1996 (age 30)
16	(Italy) Tiziana Veglia (c)	Middle Blocker	1.83	13 September 1992 (age 34)
17	(Italy) Francesca Baccolo	Middle Blocker	1.88	17 June 2001 (age 25)
18	(Belarus) Juliya Miniuk	Middle Blocker	1.89	23 May 2000 (age 26)

2017–2018 Team
Number	Player	Position	Height (m)	Birth date
1	(Italy) Clara Canton	Outside Hitter	1.86	16 April 1998 (age 28)
2	(Italy) Maria Chiara Norgini	Libero	1.70	11 September 1998 (age 28)
3	(Italy) Elena Bortolot	Setter	1.80	20 August 1995 (age 31)
5	(Italy) Sara Angelini	Middle Blocker	1.85	13 October 1989 (age 37)
6	(United States) Cat Dailey	Outside Hitter	1.88	10 June 1988 (age 38)
~~7~~	(Italy) ~~Giulia Biava~~ (Note: Giulia Biava left the team on 18 January 2018.)	~~Outside Hitter~~	~~1.78~~	~~19 December 1988 (age 37)~~
7	(Italy) Simona Gioli (Note: Simona Gioli joined the team in early February 2018.)	Middle Blocker	1.85	17 September 1977 (age 49)
~~8~~	(Finland) ~~Pauliina Vilponen~~ (Note: Pauliina Vilponen left the team on 3 January 2018.)	~~Outside Hitter~~	~~1.90~~	~~20 February 1992 (age 34)~~
9	(Italy) Francesca Villani	Outside Hitter	1.87	30 May 1995 (age 31)
10	(Italy) Francesca Parlangeli	Libero	1.65	23 February 1990 (age 36)
11	(Italy) Vittoria Prandi	Setter	1.80	4 November 1994 (age 31)
12	(Italy) Angela Gabbiadini (Note: Angela Gabbiadini joined the team in early February 2018.)	Outside Hitter	1.81	12 May 1992 (age 34)
~~13~~	(Italy) ~~Ludovica Guidi~~ (Note: Ludovica Guidi left the team on 31 January 2018.)	~~Middle Blocker~~	~~1.86~~	~~17 December 1992 (age 33)~~
16	(Italy) Tiziana Veglia	Middle Blocker	1.83	13 September 1992 (age 34)
17	(Italy) Clara Decortes	Opposite	1.83	7 March 1996 (age 30)

2016–2017 Team
Number	Player	Position	Height (m)	Birth date
1	(Italy) Chiara Dall'Acqua	Middle Blocker	1.83	27 September 1985 (age 41)
2	(Italy) Gloria Baldi	Opposite	1.85	31 May 1993 (age 33)
3	(Italy) Laura Garavaglia	Outside Hitter	1.85	28 December 1989 (age 36)
5	(Italy) Natalia Viganò	Outside Hitter	1.80	24 November 1979 (age 46)
6	(Italy) Elena Portalupi	Libero	1.67	19 June 1987 (age 39)
7	(Italy) Giulia Biava	Outside Hitter	1.78	19 December 1988 (age 37)
9	(Italy) Melissa Martinelli	Middle Blocker	1.85	23 March 1993 (age 33)
10	(Italy) Laura Saccomani	Outside Hitter	1.89	8 October 1991 (age 35)
11	(Italy) Vittoria Prandi	Setter	1.80	4 November 1994 (age 31)
13	(Italy) Patrizia Zampedri	Libero	1.65	13 March 1993 (age 33)
15	(Italy) Monica Mazzoleni	Middle Blocker	1.88	10 December 1997 (age 28)
17	(Italy) Alessandra Dall'Ara	Setter	1.77	9 November 1994 (age 31)
18	(Italy) Chiara Lapi	Middle Blocker	1.82	3 March 1991 (age 35)

== Head coaches ==
Period	Head coach
2015–2021	(Italy) Enrico Mazzola
2021–2021	(Italy) Stefano Micoli
2021–2024	(Italy) Alessandro Beltrami
2024–	(Italy) Matteo Solforati
