= Promoball Volleyball Flero =

Italian women's volleyball club

Promoball Volley
- Full name: Promoball Volleyball Flero
- Founded: 1972
- Ground: PalaGeorge, Montichiari, Italy (Capacity: 4,200)
- Chairman: Costanzo Lorenzotti
- League: FIPAV Women's Serie B2
- Website: Club home page

Uniforms
Home	Away

Promoball Volleyball is an Italian women's volleyball club based in Flero. It played in the Serie A1 2014–2017 and is currently playing in the Serie B2.

== Previous names ==
Due to sponsorship, the club have competed under the following names:

- Promoball Volleyball (1972–2012)
- Sanitars Metalleghe Mazzano (2012–2013)
- Metalleghe Sanitars Montichiari (2013–2016)
- Metalleghe Montichiari (2016–2017)
- Promoball Sanitars (2017–2021)
- Promoball Sanitars Gussago (2021–2022)
- Promoball Sanitars Maclodio (2022–2023)
- Promoball Sanitars (2023–present)

== History ==
The club was founded in 1972 and started competing in the regional leagues before arriving at the national lower leagues in the mid 1990s. Almost a decade later, in 2012 it was promoted to the Serie A2 and in 2014 it reached the country's highest division, the Serie A1. The club remained in the Serie A1 until 2017 when it was relegated to Serie A2. Following the loss of its main sponsor (Metalleghe) at the end of the 2016–17 season, the club was unable to financially maintain itself in the professional leagues and declined to enter the Serie A2 in the following season, focusing on youth volleyball in Serie B2 instead.

== Team ==
This was the club's latest professional team, from Season 2016–2017, as of February 2017.

Number	Player	Position	Height (m)	Birth date
1	(Serbia) Bianka Buša	Outside hitter	1.88	25 July 1994 (age 32)
3	(Italy) Ludovica Dalia	Setter	1.80	25 September 1984 (age 42)
7	(Italy) Gaia Domenighini	Outside hitter	1.80	25 April 2001 (age 25)
8	(Poland) Zuzanna Efimienko	Middle blocker	1.95	8 August 1989 (age 37)
9	(Italy) Jennifer Boldini	Setter	1.87	6 April 1999 (age 27)
10	(Serbia) Sanja Malagurski	Outside hitter	1.93	8 June 1990 (age 36)
11	(Netherlands) Flore Gravestijn	Outside hitter	1.89	26 April 1987 (age 39)
12	(Serbia) Jelena Nikolić	Outside hitter	1.92	13 April 1982 (age 44)
13	(Italy) Giuditta Lualdi	Middle blocker	1.86	13 September 1995 (age 31)
16	(Italy) Jole Ruzzini	Libero	1.62	25 February 1984 (age 42)
17	(Italy) Simona Gioli	Middle blocker	1.85	17 September 1977 (age 49)
18	(Italy) Letizia Aquilino	Libero	1.68	26 March 2002 (age 24)
