= Judith Pietersen =

Dutch volleyball player (born 1989)

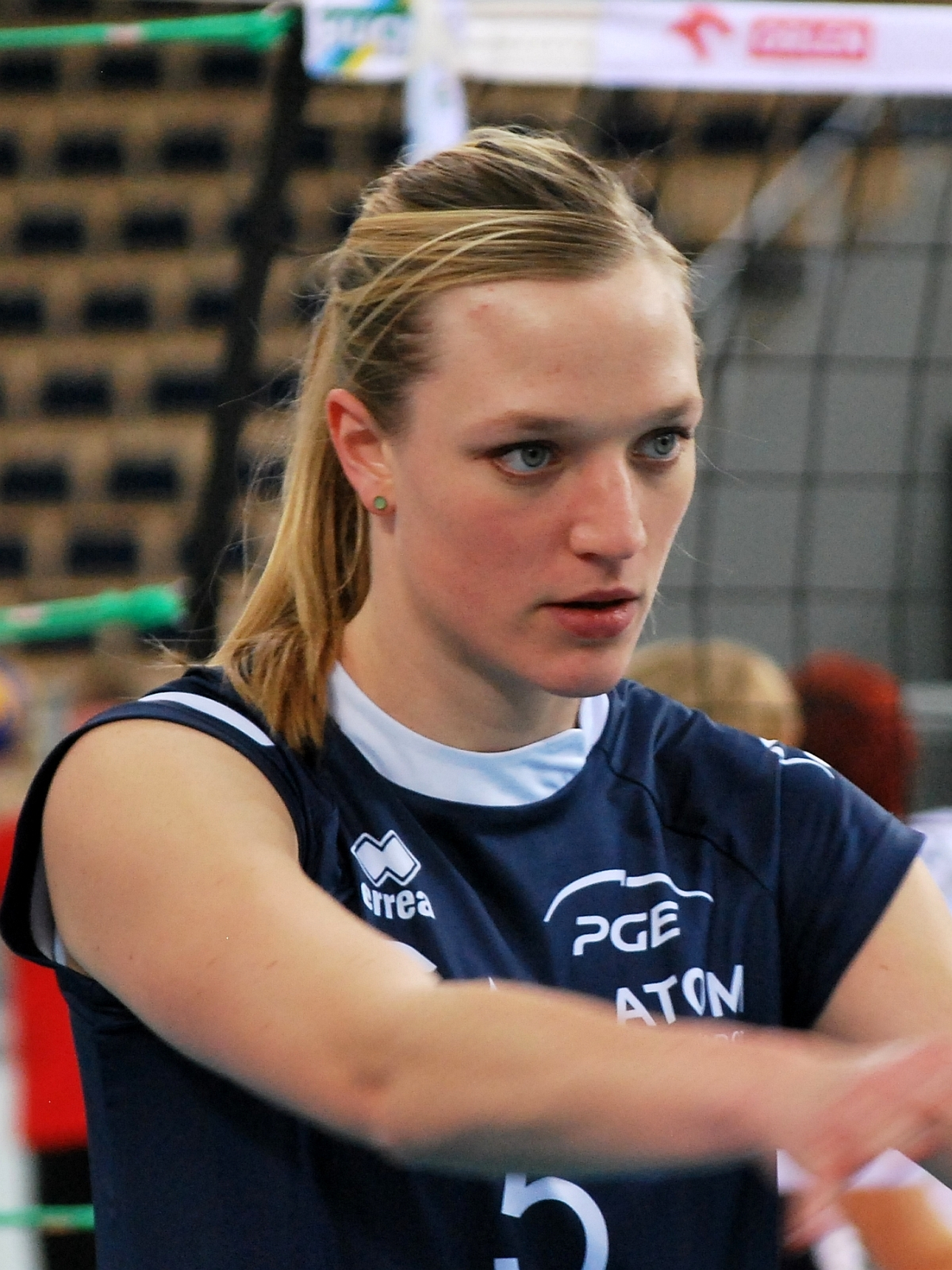

Personal information
- Nationality: Dutch
- Born: 3 July 1989 (age 37); Eibergen, Netherlands
- Height: 1.88 m (6 ft 2 in)
- Weight: 67 kg (148 lb)
- Spike: 309 cm (122 in)
- Block: 301 cm (119 in)

Volleyball information
- Position: Opposite spiker / Wing spiker
- Current club: Igor Gorgonzola Novara
- Number: 8
Honours
Women's volleyball
Representing the Netherlands
FIVB Volleyball World Grand Prix
Bronze medal – third place	2016 Bangkok	Team
European Championship
Silver medal – second place	2015 Belgium / Netherlands	Team competition

Judith Pietersen (born 3 July 1989 in Eibergen) is a Dutch volleyball player, who plays as an opposite. She is a member of the Women's National Team, and competed in the 2016 Summer Olympics. She plays for Volley Millenium Brescia.

She learned playing volleyball in the garden from her cousin Caroline Wensink, who was later a teammate in the Dutch national team.

== Clubs ==
- (Netherlands) Longa '59 Lichtenvoorde (2005–2008)
- (Netherlands) Martinus Amstelveen (2008–2009)
- (Netherlands) TVC Amstelveen (2009–2011)
- (Germany) Dresdner SC (2011–2013)
- (Poland) Atom Trefl Sopot (2013–2014)
- (Turkey) Trabzon İdmanocağı (2014–2015)
- (Italy) Pallavolo Scandicci (2015–2016)
- (Italy) AGIL Volley (2016–2017)
- (Italy) River Volley (2017–2018)
- (Italy) Volley Millenium Brescia (2018–2019)

== Awards ==
=== Clubs ===
==== National championships ====
- 2016/2017 Italian Championship, with Igor Gorgonzola Novara
