= Daniele Santarelli =

Italian volleyball coach (born 1981)

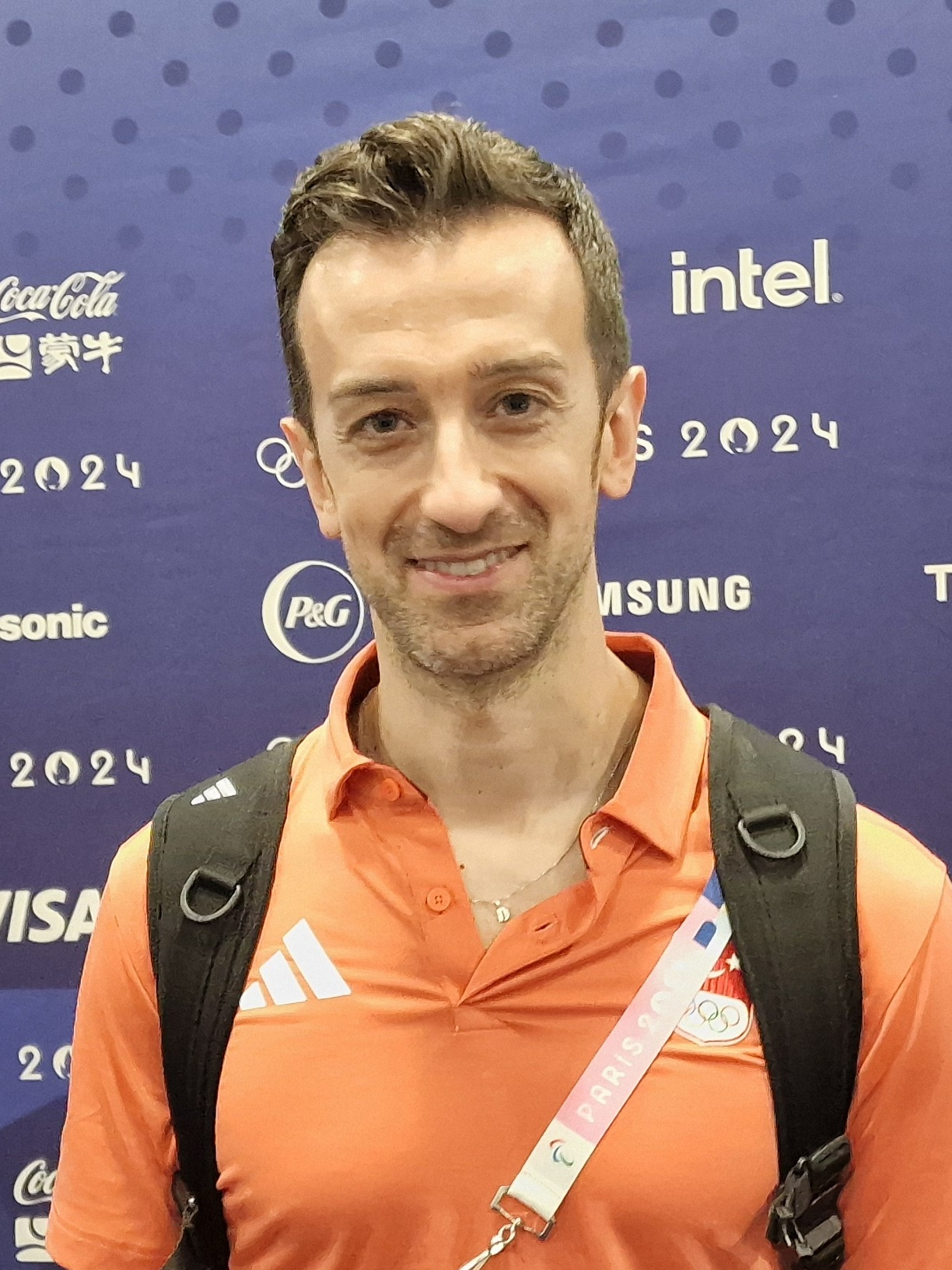
- Santarelli at the 2024 Summer Olympics

Personal information
- Nationality: Italian
- Born: 8 June 1981 (age 45); Foligno, Italy

Coaching information
- Current team: (Italy) Imoco Volley Conegliano
Previous teams coached
Years	Teams
2012–13; 2013–14; 2014–15; 2015–17; 2017– 2018–22; 2022; 2023–	Volley Pesaro (assistant); Robur Tiboni Urbino (assistant); Pomí Casalmaggiore (assistant); Imoco Volley (assistant); Imoco Volley Croatia; Serbia; Turkey
Medal record
Head coach Turkey
FIVB World Championship
Silver medal – second place	2025 Thailand	Team
FIVB Nations League
Gold medal – first place	2023 Arlington
Gold medal – first place	2026 Macau
European Championships
Gold medal – first place	2023 Belgium/Estonia/Germany/Italy
Gold medal – first place	2026 Azerbaijan/Czech Republic/Sweden/Turkey
Head coach Serbia
FIVB World Championship
Gold medal – first place	2022 Netherlands/Poland
FIVB Nations League
Bronze medal – third place	2022 Ankara
Head coach Croatia
European Volleyball League
Silver medal – second place	2019 Varaždin
Silver medal – second place	2021 Ruse
Gloria Cup
Bronze medal – third place	2019 Belek

Daniele Santarelli (born 8 June 1981 in Foligno) is an Italian women's volleyball coach. He is the current head coach of Imoco Volley and the Turkey women's national volleyball team. Previously, he was coach of the Croatian national team, and the Serbian national team with whom he won the 2022 World Championship.

== Playing career ==
Santarelli played as libero in various lower categories of Italian league (Serie B) in Foligno, Vicenza, Legnago and Terracina before pursuing his career as a youth coach at a young age.

== Coaching career ==
He was a coach for Italian teams such as Snoopy Pesaro, Robursport Pesaro, Robur Tiboni Urbino Volley. He currently leads Imoco Volley. With Imoco, Santarelli has won the Italian national league four times (2015, 2018, 2019, and 2021), 3 Italian Cups (2017, 2020 and 2021), 4 Italian Super Cups (2016, 2018, 2019 and 2020), 1 Club World Championship (2019) and the last edition of the CEV Champions League.

In the summer of 2018 he took the position of head coach of the Croatia women's national volleyball team, a position he held until the end of the 2021 European Championship. During that time he won two silver medals in the European league, held in Varaždin and Ruse. In January 2022 he became the head coach of Serbian women's national team and won bronze medal at FIVB Women's Nations League same year.

In October 2022, the Serbian national women's team headed by Santarelli won the world title at the 2022 FIVB Volleyball Women's World Championship held in Poland and the Netherlands. The team thereby successfully defended the 2018 title won under the previous coach Zoran Terzić. On 27 December 2022 it was announced by the TVF that Daniele will be the new head coach of the Turkey women's national volleyball team, and the details of the agreement would be announced at a press conference to be held jointly by TVF President Mehmet Akif Üstündağ and Daniele himself.

=== Clubs ===
FIVB Club World Championship:

- 2019, 2022, 2024
- 2021, 2025

CEV Champions League:

- 2021, 2024, 2025
- 2019, 2022
- 2018

Italian Championship:

- 2018, 2019, 2021, 2022, 2023, 2024, 2025, 2026

Italian Cup:

- 2020, 2021, 2022, 2023, 2024, 2025, 2026

Italian Super Cup:

- 2018, 2019, 2020, 2021, 2022, 2023, 2024

=== National team ===
FIVB World Championship:

- 2022
- 2025

FIVB Nations League:

- 2023, 2026
- 2022

CEV European Volleyball Championship:

- 2023, 2026

CEV European League:

- 2019, 2021

== Personal life ==
Santarelli has a degree in physical education. He has been married to the volleyball player Monica De Gennaro since 2017.
