= PalaGeorge =

Indoor arena in Montichiari, Italy

Coordinates: 45.4128°N 10.4078°E

- Interactive map of PalaGeorge
- Full name: Palazzetto Jimmy George
- Location: Montichiari, Italy
- Capacity: Basketball: 5,500; Volleyball: 4,200
- Surface: Parquet

Construction
- Opened: 1993

Tenants
- Brescia Leonessa; Promoball Flero (Metalleghe Montichiari); Millenium Brescia

PalaGeorge is an indoor arena located in Montichiari, Italy, in the province of Brescia. The capacity of the arena is 5,500 people for basketball matches and it opened in 1993. It is home of the Brescia Leonessa team of the Lega Basket Serie A and the volleyball teams Promoball Flero (also known as Metalleghe Montichiari) and Millenium Brescia of the Italian Women's Volleyball League (Series A1 and A2 respectively). It was also the home court of the Pallavolo Gabeca, the volleyball club of the city of Monza.

The arena is dedicated to Jimmy George, the Indian volleyball player who lost his life in a car accident in 1987.

In 2016 the arena hosted the 2015–16 CEV Women's Champions League Final Four in front of a crowd of 4,200 people.
