= PalaNorda =

Indoor sporting arena in Bergamo, Italy

Coordinates: 45.7017436°N 9.6783972°E

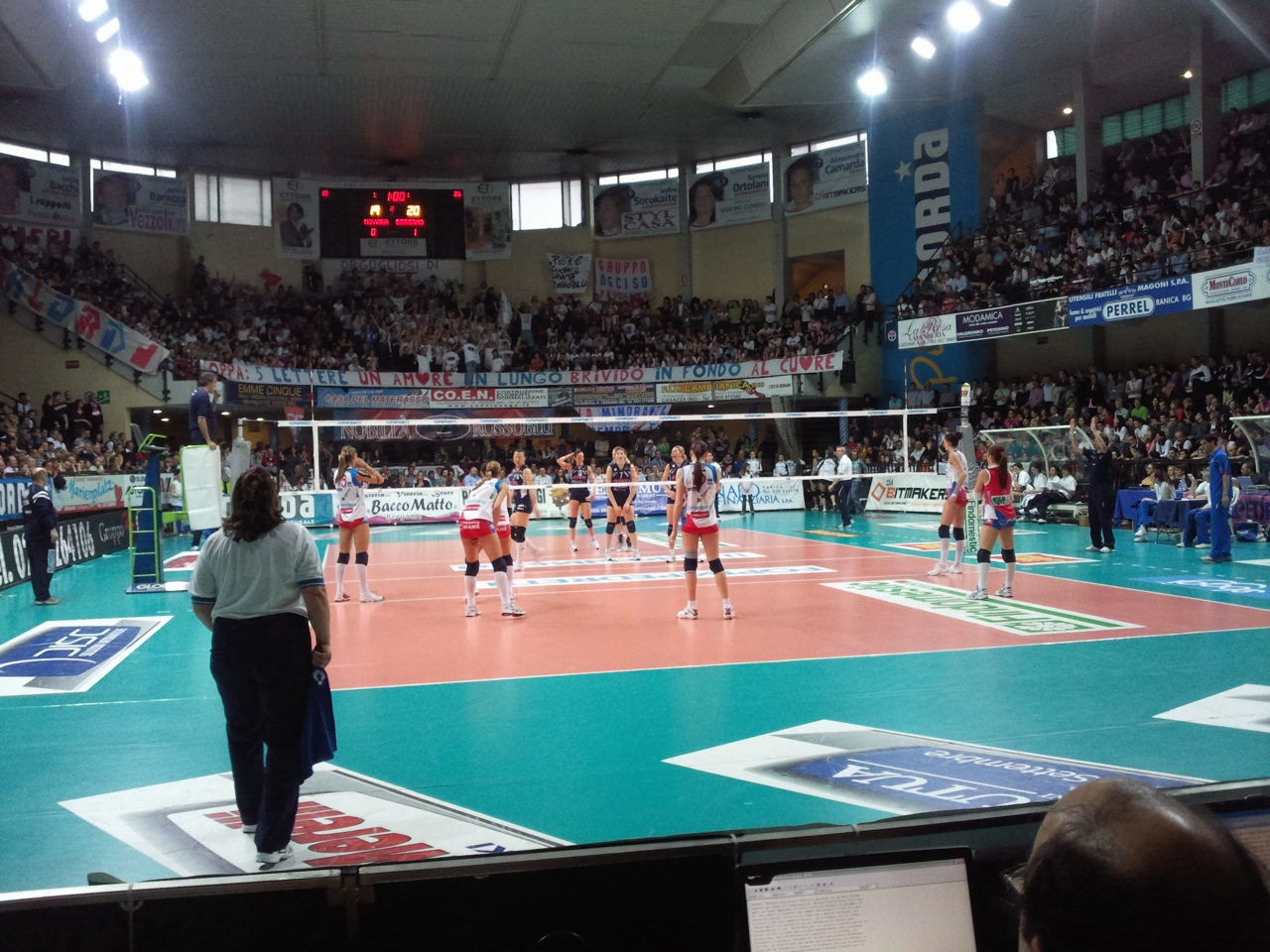
- Interactive map of PalaNorda
- Full name: Palazzetto dello Sport di Bergamo
- Address: Via Alberto Pitentino, Bergamo, Italy
- Owner: Comune di Bergamo
- Capacity: 2,250

Construction
- Built: 1962
- Opened: 6 June 1965
- Closed: 2023
- Architects: Giancarlo Eynard, Daniele Eynard
- Builder: INCAS Torino

Tenants
- Volley Bergamo Foppapedretti; Olimpia Pallavolo; Blurobica; Excelsior

The PalaNorda was an indoor sporting arena located in Bergamo, Italy. It was open on 6 June 1965 and was mainly used as the home venue for volleyball and basketball clubs based in and around Bergamo, with other sporting events (tennis, fencing, artistic gymnastics, rhythmic gymnastics) taking place occasionally.

The capacity of the arena was 2,250 people. It was the home venue of Foppapedretti Bergamo (women's volleyball), Olimpia Pallavolo (men's volleyball), Blurobica (basketball), Excelsior (basketball), Bergamasca Scherma Creberg (fencing), Orobica Ginnastica (gymnastics).

It hosted the annual tennis ATP challenger event, Trofeo Faip–Perrel from 2006 until 2022.

== Closure ==
On May 10, 2023 the last sports match was held. The arena became the headquarters of the GAMeC.
