= Polisportiva Filottrano Pallavolo =

Lardini Filottrano
- Full name: Polisportiva Filottrano Pallavolo
- Founded: 1971
- Ground: PalaBaldinelli, Osimo, Italy (Capacity: 3,481)
- League: FIPAV Women's Serie B2
- Website: Club home page

Uniforms
Home	Away

Polisportiva Filottrano Pallavolo is an Italian volleyball club based in Filottrano which currently plays in the Serie B2.

== Previous names ==
Due to sponsorship, the club have competed under the following names:

- Atletico San Cristoforo (1971–....)
- Polisportiva Filottrano Pallavolo (....–2014)
- Lardini Filottrano (2014–)

== History ==
In 1971, don Guerriero Giglioni with other young people took a late 1960s team called Fiamma ("Flame" in English) and decided to form a club called Atletico San Cristoforo. It remained mainly an amateur club with its teams (men and women from various age groups) playing in local, regional and lower national leagues until the 1980s, when former first team players became part of the club's organizational structure and the focus became more technical and organized. With sponsors support its teams start making progress and achieving promotions in the Italian leagues. The club changed its name to Polisportiva Filottrano Pallavolo and its main sponsor is local fashion company Lardini.

In 2014 the women's team was promoted to Serie A2. and in 2017 it was promototed to the Serie A1 by winning the 2016–17 Serie A2 title. In 2020 the club decided to cancel its participation in Serie A1 and restart in Serie B1.

== Team ==
2019–2020 Team
Number	Player	Position	Height (m)	Birth date
2	(Slovenia) Eva Pogačar	Setter	1.85	14 July 2000 (age 25)
4	(Italy) Laura Partenio	Outside Hitter	1.82	29 December 1991 (age 33)
6	(Italy) Sara Sopranzetti	Libero	1.73	1 January 2001 (age 24)
7	(Italy) Nia Grant	Middle Blocker	1.88	8 May 1993 (age 32)
10	(Italy) Giulia Angelina	Outside Hitter	1.92	26 February 1997 (age 28)
11	(Italy) Giulia Mancini	Middle Blocker	1.83	23 May 1998 (age 27)
12	(Greece) Athina Papafotiou	Setter	1.80	23 August 1989 (age 36)
15	(Turkey) Irem Cor	Setter	1.78	25 March 1996 (age 29)
16	(Italy) Anna Nicoletti	Opposite	1.89	3 January 1996 (age 29)
17	(Belgium) Dominika Sobolska	Middle Blocker	1.87	3 December 1991 (age 33)
18	(Italy) Veronica Bisconti	Libero	1.74	27 January 1991 (age 34)
20	(Italy) Martina Pirro	Outside Hitter	1.80	1 January 1999 (age 26)
23	(Italy) Marika Bianchini	Outside Hitter	1.76	23 April 1993 (age 32)
46	(Italy) Gaia Moretto	Middle Blocker	1.92	18 September 1994 (age 31)

2018–2019 Team
Number	Player	Position	Height (m)	Birth date
1	(Greece) Anthí Vasilantonáki	Outside Hitter	1.95	9 April 1996 (age 29)
3	(Italy) Ilaria Garzaro	Middle Blocker	1.90	29 September 1986 (age 39)
4	(United States) Courtney Schwan	Outside Hitter	1.85	9 May 1996 (age 29)
4	(Italy) Laura Partenio	Outside Hitter	1.83	29 December 1991 (age 33)
6	(Chinese Taipei) Yi Chen Yang	Setter	1.68	4 April 1992 (age 33)
7	(Japan) Koyomi Tominaga	Setter	1.75	1 May 1989 (age 36)
8	(Italy) Laura Baggi	Outside Hitter	1.90	2 January 1992 (age 33)
9	(Italy) Chiara Di Iulio	Outside Hitter	1.85	5 May 1985 (age 40)
10	(Italy) Paola Cardullo	Libero	1.62	18 March 1982 (age 43)
13	(Italy) Asia Cogliandro	Middle Blocker	1.84	12 January 1996 (age 29)
14	(United States) Aiyana Whitney	Opposite	1.94	6 April 1993 (age 32)
15	(Croatia) Bernarda Brčić	Setter	1.91	12 May 1991 (age 34)
16	(Italy) Chiara Rumori	Libero	1.63	16 June 1998 (age 27)
17	(Italy) Giulia Pisani	Middle Blocker	1.84	4 June 1992 (age 33)

2017–2018 Team
Number	Player	Position	Height (m)	Birth date
1	(Italy) Giulia Melli	Outside Hitter	1.85	8 January 1998 (age 27)
3	(Italy) Francesca Bosio	Setter	1.80	7 August 1997 (age 28)
5	(Italy) Federica Feliziani	Libero	1.72	5 August 1983 (age 42)
6	(Italy) Nicole Gamba	Libero	1.70	2 June 1998 (age 27)
7	(Italy) Chiara Negrini	Outside Hitter	1.83	27 April 1979 (age 46)
9	(Italy) Beatrice Agrifoglio	Setter	1.78	1 January 1994 (age 31)
10	(Poland) Berenika Tomsia	Opposite	1.89	18 March 1988 (age 37)
11	(United States) Annie Mitchem	Outside Hitter	1.92	22 April 1994 (age 31)
12	(Italy) Alessia Mazzaro	Middle Blocker	1.85	19 September 1998 (age 27)
13	(Italy) Asia Cogliandro	Middle Blocker	1.84	12 January 1996 (age 29)
14	(United States) Nikki Taylor	Outside Hitter	1.94	23 July 1995 (age 30)
15	(Slovenia) Sara Hutinski	Middle Blocker	1.88	20 June 1991 (age 34)
17	(Slovenia) Lana Ščuka	Outside Hitter	1.83	6 October 1996 (age 28)

2016–2017 Team
Number	Player	Position	Height (m)	Birth date
1	(Italy) Sofia Tosi	Outside Hitter	1.85	22 April 1997 (age 28)
2	(Italy) Martina Marangon	Libero	1.67	29 August 1998 (age 27)
3	(Italy) Francesca Bosio	Setter	1.80	7 August 1997 (age 28)
4	(Italy) Sonia Galazzo	Setter	1.76	11 March 1997 (age 28)
5	(Italy) Federica Feliziani	Libero	1.72	5 August 1983 (age 42)
7	(Italy) Chiara Negrini	Outside Hitter	1.83	27 April 1979 (age 46)
8	(Czech Republic) Tereza Vanžurová	Opposite	1.83	4 April 1991 (age 34)
11	(Italy) Elisa Rita	Middle Blocker	1.81	21 April 1993 (age 32)
12	(Italy) Alessia Mazzaro	Middle Blocker	1.85	19 September 1998 (age 27)
13	(Italy) Asia Cogliandro	Middle Blocker	1.84	12 January 1996 (age 29)
15	(Italy) Elena Cappelli	Outside Hitter	1.87	23 May 1996 (age 29)
17	(Slovenia) Lana Ščuka	Outside Hitter	1.83	6 October 1996 (age 28)
