= List of professional sports leagues =

This is a list of professional sports leagues and organizations.

A sports league is a professional body that governs the competition of its teams. They make the rules for competition and behavior and disciplines its members as necessary. This is done through a structure that varies by league. Some are made up of a board of governors that have a commissioner or president, while others are single entity organizations where the league owns the franchises and therefore does not have a board of governors.

This list attempts to show those sports leagues for which all players and teams are paid to play. In other words, these players can be considered to play their chosen sport as their profession. Some leagues do not pay well enough to allow players to use them as their primary or only source of income, but because the players are paid, it is still considered professional, or semi-professional. As such, some leagues listed here may not be fully professional.

== Bat and ball games: Baseball/softball ==
=== Northern Hemisphere Summer ===
==== Americas ====
- Baseball Champions League Americas

United States & Canada

- Major League Baseball:
  - American League
  - National League
- Minor League Baseball:
  - Triple-A:
    - International League
    - Pacific Coast League
  - Double-A:
    - Eastern League
    - Southern League
    - Texas League
  - High-A:
    - Midwest League
    - Northwest League
    - South Atlantic League
  - Single-A:
    - California League
    - Carolina League
    - Florida State League
  - Rookie:
    - Arizona Complex League
    - Florida Complex League
    - Dominican Summer League
- Independent baseball leagues:
  - MLB Partner Leagues:
    - American Association
    - Atlantic League
    - Frontier League
    - Pioneer League
  - Other leagues:
    - Canadian Baseball League
    - Empire Professional Baseball League
    - Pecos League
    - United Shore Professional Baseball League

Cuba

- Cuban Elite League

Curaçao

- Curaçao National Championship AA League

Dominican Republic

- Dominican Summer League

Venezuela

- Venezuelan Major League

Mexico

- Mexican Baseball League
- Mexican Academy League

Argentina

- Argentine Baseball League

==== Asia-Pacific ====
Japan

- Nippon Professional Baseball (NPB)
  - Major Leagues:
    - Central League
    - Pacific League
  - Minor League:
    - NPB Farm League (formerly Eastern League and Western League)
- Japan Regional Professional Baseball (JRPB)
  - Chubu:
    - Nihonkai League (also contains one team from Kansai)
  - Hokkaido:
    - Hokkaido Frontier League
  - Kansai:
    - KANDOK League
  - Kanto:
    - Baseball Challenge League (also contains two teams from Chubu one team from Tohoku)
  - Kyushu:
    - Kyushu Asia League
  - Shikoku:
    - Shikoku Island League Plus
- Baseball Federation of Japan (BFJ):
  - Intercity baseball tournament (officially amateur but contains professional teams)
  - Industrial Baseball League (officially amateur but contains professional teams)
  - All Japan Club Baseball Championship (officially amateur but contains professional teams)

South Korea

- Major League:
  - KBO League
- Minor League:
  - KBO Futures League

China

- China Baseball League
- Chinese Professional Baseball

Taiwan

- Major League:
  - Chinese Professional Baseball League
- Minor League:
  - Chinese Professional Baseball League, Division 2
- Independent League:
  - Popcorn League

==== Europe ====
Europe

- Baseball Champions League Europe (first-tier continental cup)
- European Confederation Cup (second-tier continental cup)
- European Federation Cup (third-tier continental cup)

Italy

- Italian Baseball League

Ireland

- Irish Baseball League

Netherlands

- Honkbal Hoofdklasse
- Honkbal Rookie League

Czech Republic

- Czech Baseball Extraliga (officially semi-professional but contains several professional teams)

France

- Division Élite (officially semi-professional but contains several professional teams)

Germany

- Deutsche Baseball Liga (officially semi-professional but contains several professional teams)

Spain

- División de Honor de Béisbol (officially semi-professional but contains several professional teams)

Sweden

- Elitserien

Poland

- Ekstraliga Baseball (semi-professional)

Portugal

- Portuguese Atlantic Baseball League (semi-professional)

Turkey

- Turkish Baseball League (semi-professional)

=== Northern Hemisphere Winter ===
==== Americas ====
- Caribbean Series
- Serie de las Américas

Argentina

- Liga Argentina de Béisbol

Colombia

- Liga Colombiana de Béisbol Profesional

Cuba

- Cuban National Series

Curaçao

- Curaçao Professional Baseball League

Dominican Republic

- Liga de Béisbol Profesional de la República Dominicana

Mexico

- Liga Invernal Veracruzana
- Liga Mexicana del Pacífico

Nicaragua

- La Liga Nicaragüense de Beisbol Profesional

Panama

- Probeis

Puerto Rico

- Liga de Béisbol Profesional Roberto Clemente

United States

- Arizona Fall League (MLB)

Venezuela

- Liga Venezolana de Béisbol Profesional
- Liga Paralela de Béisbol en Venezuela

==== Asia-Pacific ====
Australia

- Australian Baseball League
- Greater Brisbane League

Japan, South Korea, and Taiwan

- Asia Winter Baseball League
- Miyazaki Phoenix League

United Arab Emirates

- Baseball United

=== Softball ===
United States

- Women's Professional Fastpitch
- Athletes Unlimited Softball League

United Kingdom

- National Softball League
- ESF men's EC club championships
- ESF Co-Ed Slowpitch European Super Cup

Japan

- Japan Diamond Softball League

Mexico

- Mexican Softball League

== Bat and ball games: Cricket ==
- International
  - Euro T20 Slam
  - East Africa Premier League
  - World Cricket League Africa Region
- European Cricket League
- Hong Kong Cricket Sixes

=== Africa ===
South Africa

- Momentum One Day Cup
- CSA T20 Challenge
- CSA Provincial Competitions
- SA20
- Sunfoil Series

Zimbabwe

- Zim Afro T10
- Logan Cup
- Pro50 Championship
- Stanbic Bank 20 Series

=== North America ===
CAN

- Global T20 Canada

USA

- Major League Cricket
  - Minor League Cricket

West Indies

- Caribbean Premier League
- Women's Caribbean Premier League
- Professional Cricket League
- Regional Super50

=== Asia ===
Afghanistan

- Shpageeza Cricket League

Bangladesh

- Bangladesh Premier League

India

- Indian Premier League
- Women's Premier League

Pakistan

- Pakistan Super League

Sri Lanka

- Lanka Premier League

South Korea

- Korea Cup T20 Cricket League

Nepal

- Nepal Premier League

United Arab Emirates

- International League T20
- Abu Dhabi T10

=== Europe ===
England and Wales

- County Championship
- One Day Cup
- T20 Blast
- The Hundred (cricket)

Scotland

- Regional Pro Series
- Scottish super 10

Netherlands

- Dutch Twenty20 Cup

Ireland

- Inter-Provincial Trophy

=== Oceania ===
Australia

- Sheffield Shield
- One-Day Cup
- Women's National Cricket League
- Big Bash League
- Women's Big Bash League

New Zealand

- Plunket Shield
- The Ford Trophy
- Men's Super Smash
- Women's Super Smash
- State League

== Bat and ball games: Pesäpallo ==
Finland:

- Superpesis

== Bowling ==
- Professional Bowlers Association

== Bull riding ==
- Professional Bull Riders

== Chess ==
- Global Chess League

Philippines

- Professional Chess Association of the Philippines

== Combat sports: Boxing and Bare-knuckle boxing ==
Major promotions

- (United States) Top Rank Boxing
- (United States) Golden Boy Promotions
- (United States) Don King Promotions
- (United States) DiBella Entertainment
- (United States) Premier Boxing Champions
- (United States) Bare Knuckle Fighting Championship
- (United States) BYB Extreme Fighting Series
- (United States) Zuffa Boxing
- (Germany) Sauerland Events
- (United Kingdom) Misfits Boxing
- (United Kingdom) Matchroom Boxing
- (United Kingdom) Queensberry Promotions
- (United Kingdom) Boxxer
- (Australia) D&L Events (formerly Duco Events)
- (India) Super Boxing League
- (Russia) Hardcore Fighting Championship
- (Russia) Top Dog Fighting Championship
- (Poland) Gromda Fight Club

Major sanctioning bodies

- World Boxing Association (WBA)
- World Boxing Council (WBC)
- International Boxing Federation (IBF)
- World Boxing Organization (WBO)
- The Ring Magazine (unofficial sanctioning body)

== Combat sports: Grappling & Professional wrestling ==
United States

- WWE
  - NXT – WWE's development circuit
- All Elite Wrestling
  - Ring of Honor – shares ownership with All Elite Wrestling, but remains a separate legal entity
- Total Nonstop Action Wrestling
- Major League Wrestling
- National Wrestling Alliance
- Women of Wrestling
- Game Changer Wrestling

Japan

- New Japan Pro-Wrestling
  - World Wonder Ring Stardom – New Japan Pro-Wrestling's women's wrestling circuit
- All Japan Pro Wrestling
- DDT Pro-Wrestling
- Dragon Gate
- Pro Wrestling Noah
- Tokyo Joshi Pro Wrestling

Mexico

- Consejo Mundial de Lucha Libre
- Lucha Libre AAA Worldwide
- International Wrestling Revolution Group
- The Crash Lucha Libre

Australia

- World Series Wrestling

International

- ADCC Submission Fighting World Championship

== Combat sports: Fencing ==
- American Fencing League

== Combat sports: Kickboxing ==
- (United Kingdom) : Glory
- (Japan) : K-1
- (Lithuania) : King of Kings
- (China) : Kunlun Fight
- (China) : Wu Lin Feng

== Combat sports: Mixed martial arts ==
- United States: Ultimate Fighting Championship (Premier American/International Organization)
- United States: Professional Fighters League (Second Tier American Organization)
- United States: Legacy Fighting Alliance (Minor American Organization)
- United States: King of the Cage (Minor American Organization)
- United States: Titan Fighting Championships (Minor American Organization)
- United States: Invicta Fighting Championships (Minor American Organization)
- Japan: Rizin FF (Premier Japanese Organization)
- Japan: Shooto (Second Tier Japanese Organization)
- Japan: Pancrase (Second Tier Japanese Organization)
- Japan: DEEP (Minor Japanese Organization)
- Japan: ZST (Minor Japanese Organization)
- Japan: GLEAT (Minor Japanese Organization)
- Russia: Absolute Championship Akhmat (Premier Russian-based Organization)
- Russia: Fight Nights Global (Premier Russian-based Organization)
- Russia: M-1 Global (Second Tier Russian-based Organization)
- Mexico: LUX Fight League (Premier Mexican Organization)
- Mexico: Ultimate Warrior Challenge Mexico (Second Tier Mexican Organization)
- Mexico: Budo Sento Championship (Second Tier Mexican Organization)
- Brazil: Jungle Fight (Premier Brazilian Organization)
- Brazil: Shooto Brasil (Second Tier Brazilian Organization)
- South Korea: Road Fighting Championship (Premier Korean Organization)
- South Korea: Top Fighting Championship (Second Tier Korean Organization)
- Singapore: ONE Championship (Premier Singaporean Organization)
- Poland: Konfrontacja Sztuk Walki (Premier Polish-based Organization)
- United Kingdom: Cage Warriors (Premier British Organization)
- Netherlands: United Glory (Premier Dutch Organization)
- China: Kunlun Fight (Premier Chinese Organization)
- Hong Kong: Legend Fighting Championship (Premier Hong Kong-based Organization)
- Philippines: Universal Reality Combat Championship (Premier Filipino Organization)
- Lithuania: MMA Bushido (Premier Lithuanian Organization)
- India: Super Fight League (Premier Indian Organization)

== Competitive eating ==
- Major League Eating

== Curling ==
- World Curling Tour

== Cycling ==
Italy

- Coppa Italia di ciclismo (the Italian Road Cycling Cup)
- International
  - UCI World Tour

== Extreme Sports ==
- X Games

== Football: Association football ==
- International
  - FIFA Club World Cup
  - UEFA Champions League
  - Copa Libertadores

=== Beach soccer ===
Ukraine

- Ukrainian Beach Soccer Premier League
- International
  - Euro Winners Cup
  - Women's Euro Winners Cup
  - Copa Libertadores de Beach Soccer

=== Futsal ===
- International
  - UEFA Futsal Champions League
  - Asian Premier Futsal Championship
  - AFC Futsal Club Championship
  - Copa Libertadores de Futsal
  - CONCACAF Futsal Club Championship
  - Intercontinental Futsal Cup

Austria

- Austrian Futsal Liga

Argentina

- Argentine División de Honor de Futsal

Belarus

- Belarusian Futsal Premier League

Brazil

- Liga Nacional de Futsal

Bosnia and Herzegovina

- Premier Futsal League of Bosnia and Herzegovina

Czech Republic

- Czech Futsal First League

China

- Chinese Futsal League

Germany

- Futsal-Regionalliga Süd
- Futsal-Bayernliga

France

- Championnat de France de Futsal

Indonesia

- Indonesia Pro Futsal League

Israel

- Israeli Futsal League

Iran

- Iranian Futsal Super League

Italy

- Serie A1

Latvia

- Latvian Futsal Premier League

Malaysia

- Malaysia Premier Futsal League
- Malaysia Premier Futsal League (Women)

Myanmar

- Myanmar Futsal League

Kyrgyzstan

- Kyrgyzstan Futsal League

Japan

- F.League

South Korea

- FK-League

Serbia

- Serbian Prva Futsal Liga

Poland

- Ekstraklasa (futsal)

Portugal

- Liga Portuguesa de Futsal

Spain

- Primera División de Futsal

Sweden

- Swedish Futsal League

Switzerland

- Swiss Futsal Championship

Russia

- Russian Futsal Super League
- Russian Women's Futsal Super League

Thailand

- Futsal Thai League

Turkey

- Turkish Futsal League

Uzbekistan

- Uzbekistan Futsal League

United States

- Professional Futsal League

United Kingdom

- National Futsal Series
- National Futsal League
- Scottish Futsal League

Vietnam

- Vietnam Futsal League

Ukraine

- Extra-Liga

=== Indoor soccer ===
United States

- Major Arena Soccer League
- Major Arena Soccer League 2
- Western Indoor Soccer League
- Arena Soccer League

== Football: Australian rules football ==
=== Asia ===
- Asian Australian Football Championships

=== Europe ===
- Euro Cup (AFL)
- AFL Europe Championship

=== Oceania ===
Australia

- Australian Football League
- AFL Women's
- South Australian National Football League
- Victorian Football League
- West Australian Football League

== Football: Gaelic football ==
- International
  - Gaelic Athletic Association

== Football: Gridiron football ==
Includes American and Canadian Football and their variants.

=== North America ===
United States

- National Football League
  - United Football League
  - Gridiron Developmental Football League
  - Rivals Professional Football League
    - Empire Football League (semi-professional)
    - New England Football League (semi-professional)
    - Pacific Northwest Football League (semi-professional)
- Women's Football Alliance
  - Legends Football League
  - A7FL
  - United States Women's Football League
- Indoor:
  - Indoor Football League
  - National Arena League
  - American Indoor Football
  - American Arena League
  - Great Lakes Arena Football
  - Arena Football One
- Flag football
  - American Flag Football League

Canada

- Canadian Football League
- Western Women's Canadian Football League
- Maritime Women's Football League

=== Central and South Americas ===
Brazil

- Superliga Nacional de Futebol Americano

Mexico

- Liga de Fútbol Americano Profesional

=== Europe ===
Europe

- European League of Football

Austria

- Austrian Football League

Belgium

- Belgian Football League

Croatia

- Croatian League of American Football

Czech Republic

- Czech League of American Football (semi-professional)

Denmark

- National Ligaen

Finland

- Vaahteraliiga

France

- Ligue Élite de Football Américain

Germany

- German Football League and German Football League 2

Hungary

- Hungarian American Football League

Ireland

- American Football Ireland

Israel

- Israel Football League

Italy

- Italian Football League

Netherlands

- Premier League

Portugal

- Liga Portuguesa de Futebol Americano

Russia

- Russian American Football Championship
- Eastern European Super League

Slovakia

- Slovak Football League

Spain

- Liga Nacional de Fútbol Americano

Sweden

- Superserien (semi-professional)

Switzerland

- Nationalliga A

Turkey

- Türkiye Korumalı Futbol Ligi

UK

- BAFA National Leagues

=== Asia ===
China

- Chinese National Football League

Japan

- X-League

=== Oceania ===
Australia

- Australian Gridiron League

== Football: Rugby football ==
=== Rugby league ===
Europe

- (United Kingdom) (France) Super League
  - (United Kingdom) RFL Championship
    - (United Kingdom) RFL League 1
- (United Kingdom) RFL Women's Super League
- (France) Elite One Championship
  - (France) Elite Two Championship

Oceania

- (Australia) (New Zealand) National Rugby League
  - (Australia) (New Zealand) Canterbury Cup NSW
  - (Australia) (Papua New Guinea) Queensland Cup
  - (Australia) NSW Challenge Cup
    - (Australia) (Fiji) Ron Massey Cup (semi-professional)
    - (Australia) Group 7 Rugby League (semi-professional)
  - (New Zealand) NZ National Competition
  - Papua New Guinea National Rugby League (semi-professional)
- (Australia) (New Zealand) NRL Women's Premiership
- (Australia) QRL Women's Premiership

=== Rugby union ===
Intercontinental

- (Ireland) (Italy) (Scotland) (South Africa) (Wales) United Rugby Championship

Africa

- (South Africa) Currie Cup Premier Division
  - (South Africa) (Kenya) (Zimbabwe) (Namibia) Currie Cup First Division
- Kenya Cup (semi-professional)
- (Madagascar) Top 20 (semi-professional)

Americas

- (United States) Major League Rugby
- (Argentina) (Brazil) (Chile) (Colombia) (Paraguay) (Uruguay) Súper Liga Americana de Rugby

Asia-Pacific

- (India) Rugby Premier League
- (Australia) (New Zealand) (Fiji) Super Rugby
- (New Zealand) NPC
- (South Korea) Korea Super Rugby League (semi-professional)
- Japan
  - Japan Rugby League One - Division 1
  - Japan Rugby League One - Division 2
  - Japan Rugby League One - Division 3 (semi-professional)
- Sri Lanka Rugby Championship (semi-professional)

Europe

- (England) Premiership Rugby
  - (England) Premiership Rugby Shield
  - (England) (Jersey) RFU Championship
  - (England) National League 1 (semi-professional)
  - (England) Premier 15s (semi-professional)
- National Rugby League (France) - Top 14
  - National Rugby League (France) - Rugby Pro D2
  - (France) - Championnat Fédéral Nationale (semi-professional)
- (Russia) Russian Rugby Championship
- (Romania) CEC Bank SuperLiga
- (Italy) Top12 (semi-professional)
- (Czech Republic) Extraliga ragby (semi-professional)
- All-Ireland League (rugby union) (semi-professional)
- (Poland) Ekstraliga (rugby) (semi-professional)
- (Scotland) Super 6 (semi-professional)
- (Spain) División de Honor de Rugby (semi-professional)
- (Wales) Welsh Premier Division (semi-professional)
- (Georgia (country)) Didi 10 (semi-professional)
- (Georgia (country)) (Russia) (Israel) (Portugal) (Spain) (Netherlands) (Belgium) Rugby Europe Super Cup (semi-professional)
- (France) (Ireland) (England) (Wales) (Scotland) (Italy) European Rugby Champions Cup
- (France) (Ireland) (England) (Wales) (Scotland) (Italy) European Rugby Challenge Cup

Pro clubs in an amateur league

- (Germany) Heidelberger RK

== Golf ==
- (India) Indian Golf Premier League

=== Men's ===
==== Top-level tours ====
- PGA Tour (United States)
- PGA European Tour
- Japan Golf Tour
- Asian Tour (Asia outside Japan)
- PGA Tour of Australasia (Australia and New Zealand)
- Sunshine Tour (southern Africa, mainly South Africa)
- Professional Golf Tour of India
- LIV Golf

==== Senior tours ====
- PGA Tour Champions (United States)
- European Senior Tour

==== Developmental tours ====
- Korn Ferry Tour (second-tier US tour, operated by the PGA Tour)
- Challenge Tour (second-tier European tour)
- Japan Challenge Tour (second-tier Japanese tour)
- Satellite Tours, four third-level tours recognised by the European Tour:
  - Alps Tour (jointly sanctioned by the golf associations of Austria, France, Italy, Morocco and Switzerland)
  - Pro Golf Tour (based in Germany)
  - Nordic Golf League (operating in the Nordic countries)
    - Swedish Golf Tour (men's version is a Swedish tour included in the Nordic League competition)
- Fuzion Minor League Golf Tour (low cost fourth-tier US tour)

=== Women's ===
==== Top-level tours ====
- LPGA (Ladies Professional Golf Association; United States)
- LPGA of Japan Tour
- Ladies European Tour
- LPGA of Korea Tour (South Korea)
- Ladies Asian Golf Tour (Asia outside Japan and Korea)
- ALPG Tour (Australia)

==== Senior tours ====
- Legends Tour (United States)

==== Developmental tours ====
- Epson Tour (second-tier US tour, operated by the LPGA)
- Ladies European Tour Access Series, LETAS, the official feeder tour to the Ladies European Tour, has been formed to give players not part of a major tour an opportunity to compete and progress on to the Ladies European Tour.
- Step Up Tour (second-tier Japanese tour, operated by the LPGA of Japan)
- Swedish Golf Tour (women's version is a second-tier tour in Sweden, feeding to the Ladies European Tour)

== Handball ==
- Angola Men's Handball League
- Angola Women's Handball League
- Handball Liga Austria
- (Algeria) Algerian Handball Championship
- (Algeria) Algerian Women's Handball Championship
- (Belarus) Belarusian Men's Handball Championship
- (Belarus) Belarusian Women's Handball Championship
- (Belgium) Belgian First Division (men's handball)
- (Belgium) Belgian First Division (women's handball)
- (Bulgaria) Bulgarian GHR A
- (Czech Republic) Czech Handball Extraliga
- (Croatia) Croatian Premier Handball League
- (Croatia) Croatian First League (women's handball)
- (Denmark) Danish Men's Handball League
- (Denmark) Danish Women's Handball League
- (Finland) Finnish Handball League
- (Hungary) Nemzeti Bajnokság I (men's handball)
- (Hungary) Nemzeti Bajnokság I (women's handball)
- (India) Indian Premier Handball League
- (United Kingdom) Premier Handball League
- (Serbia) Serbian Handball Super League
- (Serbia) Serbian Super League of Handball for Women
- (Slovakia) Slovenská hadzanárska extraliga
- (Slovenia) Slovenian First League (men's handball)
- (Slovenia) Slovenian First League (women's handball)
- (Sweden) Handbollsligan
- (Sweden) Svensk handbollselit
- (Iceland) Úrvalsdeild karla (handball)
- (Iceland) Úrvalsdeild kvenna (handball)
- (Switzerland) Swiss Handball League
- (Switzerland) SPAR Premium League
- (Germany) Handball-Bundesliga
- (Germany) 2. Handball-Bundesliga
- (Germany) DHB-Pokal
- (Germany) Handball-Bundesliga (women)
- (Greece) Greek Men's Handball Championship
- (Greece) Greek Women's Handball Championship
- (Italy) Serie A (men's handball)
- (Italy) Serie A1 (women's handball)
- (Israel) Ligat Ha'Al (handball)
- Championnat de France de handball
- Championnat de France de handball féminin
- (Spain) Liga ASOBAL
- (Spain) División de Plata de Balonmano
- (Spain) División de Honor Femenina de Balonmano
- (Portugal) Campeonato Nacional de Andebol Masculino Andebol 1
- (Portugal) 1ª Divisão de Andebol Feminino
- Japan Handball League
- (South Korea) Handball Korea League
- (Montenegro) Montenegrin First League of Men's Handball
- (Montenegro) Montenegrin First League of Women's Handball
- (North Macedonia) Macedonian Handball Super League
- (Poland) Polish Superliga (men's handball)
- (Poland) Polish Women's Superliga (women's handball)
- (Romania) Liga Națională (men's handball)
- (Romania) Divizia A1 (men's volleyball)
- (Romania) Liga Națională (women's handball)
- (Romania) Divizia A (women's handball)
- (Russia) Russian Handball Super League
- (Russia) Russian Women's Handball Super League
- (Romania) Liga Națională (men's handball)
- (Romania) Liga Națională (women's handball)
- (Tunisia) Tunisian Handball League
- (Tunisia) Tunisian Women's Handball League
- (Turkey) Turkish Handball Super League
- (Turkey) Turkish Women's Handball Super League
- (Ukraine) Ukrainian Men's Handball Super League
- (Ukraine) Ukrainian Women's Handball Super League
- (Latvia) (Lithuania) (Estonia) Baltic Handball League
- (Belgium) (Netherlands) Super Handball League Men
- (Croatia) (Hungary) (North Macedonia) (Serbia) (Slovakia) SEHA League (Southeast Europe)
- Women Handball International League
- Asian Club League Handball Championship
- Asian Women's Club League Handball Championship
- African Women's Handball Champions League
- African Handball Cup Winners' Cup
- EHF European League
- EHF European Cup
- Women's EHF European Cup
- North American and Caribbean Senior Club Championship
- South and Central American Men's Club Handball Championship
- South and Central American Women's Club Handball Championship
- Oceania Handball Champions Cup
- Oceania Women's Handball Champions Cup
- IHF Super Globe
- IHF Women's Super Globe

== Hockey: Bandy ==
Finland

- Bandyliiga
- Suomi-sarja

Russia

- Russian Bandy Super League
- Russian Bandy Supreme League

Sweden

- Elitserien
- Allsvenskan
- International
  - Bandy World Cup
  - Bandy World Cup Women

== Hockey: Field hockey ==
Asia

- India: Hockey India League
- Malaysia: Malaysia Hockey League

Europe

- (European Union) Europe: Euro Hockey League
- (European Union) Europe: Women's Euro Hockey League
- Netherlands: Men's Hoofdklasse Hockey
- Germany: Feldhockey Bundesliga (Men's field hockey)
- Belgium: Men's Belgian Hockey League

Australia

- Australia: Hockey One

=== Indoor hockey ===
- Men's EuroHockey Indoor Club Cup
- Women's EuroHockey Indoor Club Cup

== Hockey: Ice hockey ==
=== North America ===
Canada and United States

- National Hockey League (major)
- American Hockey League (high minor)
- ECHL (mid-minor)
- Professional Women's Hockey League (women's major)

Canada only

- Canadian Hockey League (minor)
- Ligue Nord-Américaine de Hockey (low minor)
- Big 6 Hockey League (low minor)

United States only

- SPHL (low minor)
- Federal Prospects Hockey League (low minor)

Mexico

- Liga Mexicana Élite de Hockey (semi-professional)

=== Asia ===
Russia, Belarus, Kazakhstan and China

- Kontinental Hockey League (major)

Russia only

- Russian Major League (high minor)
- Russian Hockey League (low minor)
- Russian Women's Hockey League

South Korea and Japan

- Asia League Ice Hockey

Kazakhstan

- Kazakhstan Hockey Championship

Mongolia

- Mongolia Hockey League

Taiwan

- Chinese Taipei Ice Hockey League

Hong Kong

- Hong Kong Ice Hockey League

Israel

- Israeli League (ice hockey)

=== Europe ===
- Champions Hockey League
- European Women's Hockey League
- IIHF Continental Cup

Austria, Croatia, Slovakia, Hungary, Czech Republic, and Italy

- ICE Hockey League

Austria, Italy, and Slovenia

- Alps Hockey League

Estonia Latvia Lithuania

- Baltic Hockey League

Belgium, Netherlands

- BeNe League

Belarus

- Belarusian Extraleague

Bulgaria

- Bulgarian Hockey League

Scotland and Ireland

- Celtic League Cup

Czech Republic

- Czech Extraliga
- 1st Czech Republic Hockey League
- 2nd Czech Republic Hockey League

Croatia

- Croatian Ice Hockey League

Serbia

- Serbian Hockey League

Denmark

- Metal Ligaen
- Danish Division 1

France

- Ligue Magnus
- FFHG Division 1

Finland

- Liiga
- Mestis
- Suomi-sarja
- 2. Divisioona
- 3. Divisioona
- Naisten Liiga
- Naisten Mestis

Germany

- Deutsche Eishockey Liga
- DEL2
- Oberliga

Austria, Hungary and Romania

- Erste Liga (ice hockey)

Latvia

- Latvian Hockey Higher League

Lithuania

- Lithuania Hockey League

Estonia

- Meistriliiga

Netherlands and Belgium

- Eredivisie

Norway

- GET-ligaen
- Norwegian First Division (ice hockey)
- Norwegian Second Division (ice hockey)

Italy

- Italian Hockey League - Serie A
- Italian Hockey League - Serie B
- Italian Hockey League - Serie C

Poland

- Polska Hokej Liga

Romania

- Romanian Hockey League

Slovakia, Hungary

- Slovak Extraliga
- Slovak 1.Liga
- Slovak 2. Liga

Slovenia

- Slovenian Ice Hockey League

Switzerland

- National League
- Swiss League
- MySports League
- Swiss 1. Liga
- Swiss 2. Liga

Sweden

- Swedish Hockey League
- HockeyAllsvenskan
- Hockeyettan
- Hockeytvåan
- Swedish Women's Hockey League
- Damettan
- Damtvåan

Turkey

- Turkish Ice Hockey Super League
- Turkish Ice Hockey First League
- Turkish Women's Ice Hockey League

United Kingdom (England, Scotland, Wales, and Northern Ireland)

- Elite Ice Hockey League
- National Ice Hockey League
- Scottish National League
- Northern League (ice hockey, 2005–)

=== Oceania ===
Australia

- Australian Ice Hockey League (semi-pro)
- East Coast Super League

New Zealand

- New Zealand Ice Hockey League (amateur)

== Hockey: on skates ==
=== Inline hockey ===
- Professional Inline Hockey Association (United States)

=== Quad hockey/Rink hockey ===
- OK Liga
- Rink Hockey Euroleague
- World Skate Europe Cup
- Continental Cup (rink hockey)
- Rink Hockey European Female League
- Roller Hockey Intercontinental Cup
- Roller Hockey Women's Intercontinental Cup
- Portuguese Roller Hockey First Division (Portugal)
- Roller Hockey Premier League (UK)

== Lacrosse ==
=== Box / Indoor lacrosse ===
Canada and United States

- NLL – National Lacrosse League (Canada and United States) [major]
- WLA – Western Lacrosse Association (Canada) [high minor]
- MSL – Major Series Lacrosse (Canada) [high minor]
- ALL – Arena Lacrosse League (Canada) [high minor]

=== Field lacrosse ===
- PLL – Premier Lacrosse League (United States) [major]
  - Merged with the competing Major League Lacrosse in December 2020, with the merged league operating as the PLL.
- ALL - American Lacrosse League (United States) [low minor/club]
- Europe
  - Ken Galluccio Cup

=== Sixes ===
- Women's Lacrosse League
- Major League Sixes

== Netball ==
- Australia – Super Netball
  - Australia – Australian Netball League (Semi-Professional)
- New Zealand – ANZ Premiership
- United Kingdom – Netball Superleague
- Singapore – Netball Super League (Singapore)

== Racing: Automobile ==
- American Hot Rod Association
- Arena Racing USA
- Asian Le Mans Series
- British Touring Car Championship (United Kingdom)
- British GT Championship (United Kingdom)
- Copa Truck
- Deutsche Tourenwagen Masters (German Touring Car Masters)
- D1 Grand Prix
- European Le Mans Series
- Fédération Internationale de l'Automobile (FIA)
- Formula One
- Formula 2
- Formula 3
- Formula D
- Formula E
- Fórmula Truck
- GT World Challenge Endurance Cup
- GT World Challenge Europe
- IMSA SportsCar Championship
- International Hot Rod Association (IHRA)
- IndyCar Series (United States)
- Indy NXT Series (United States)
- Lucas Oil Off-Road Racing
- NASCAR (National Association for Stock Car Auto Racing) (United States)
- National Hot Rod Association (NHRA)
- Stock Car Pro Series (Brazil)
- Super DIRTcar Series
- Super Formula Championship (Japan)
- Super Formula Lights (Japan)
- Super GT / Japan Automobile Federation
- Superstar Racing Experience (SRX)
- TC 2000 Championship
- FIA TCR World Tour
- Top Race V6
- Turismo Carretera
- Supercars Championship (Australia)
- Super2 Series (Australia)
- FIA World Endurance Championship
- World of Outlaws (WoO)
- World Rally Championship (WRC)
- World Rallycross Championship (WorldRX)

== Racing: Motorcycle ==
- Fédération Internationale de Motocyclisme (FIM)
- Grand Prix motorcycle racing (MotoGP)
- Superbike World Championship (WorldSBK)
- Endurance World Championship (EWC)
- Motocross World Championship (MXGP)
- World Supercross Championship (WSX)
- Enduro World Championship (Enduro GP)
- Trial World Championship (Trial GP)
- Supermoto World Championship (S1GP)
- Speedway World Championship (Speedway GP)
- AMA MotoAmerica Superbike Championship (United States)
- AMA Supercross Championship (United States)
- AMA Pro Motocross Championship (United States)
- AMA Flat Track Championship (United States)
- Asia Road Racing Championship
- Australian Superbike Championship (Australia)
- Australian Pro Motocross Championship (Australia)
- Australian Supercross Championship (Australia)
- British Superbike Championship (United Kingdom)
- British Motocross Championship (United Kingdom)
- Isle of Man TT

=== Speedway ===
- Denmark:
  - Danish Speedway League
- Poland:
  - Speedway Ekstraliga
- Sweden:
  - Elitserien
  - Allsvenskan
- United Kingdom:
  - SGB Premiership

== Racquet sports: Badminton ==
India

- Premier Badminton League

Indonesia

- Indonesian League (badminton)
- Europe Cup (badminton)

== Racquet sports: Pickleball ==
Australia

- Major League Pickleball Australia
- National Pickleball League Australia
- PPA Tour Australia

India

- World Pickleball League

United States

- Association of Pickleball Players Tour
- Major League Pickleball
- National Pickleball League of Champions Pros
- PPA Tour

== Racquet sports: Racquetball ==
- International Racquetball Tour
- Ladies Professional Racquetball Tour

== Racquet sports: Table tennis ==
- China Table Tennis Super League
- (Germany) Bundesliga (table tennis)
- (India) Ultimate Table Tennis
- (Japan) T.League
- (Egypt) Egyptian Table Tennis League
- European Champions League (table tennis)

== Racquet sports: Tennis ==
India

- Tennis Premier League

Others

- Association of Tennis Professionals
- International Tennis Federation
- Lawn Tennis Association
- Tennis Australia
- United States Tennis Association
- Women's Tennis Association

== Roll Ball ==
India

- Maha Roll Ball League

United States

- Roll Ball One

United Kingdom

- Pro Roll Ball One

European Union

- Roll Ball League

== Shooting ==
India

- Shooting League of India

Germany

- Bundesliga (shooting)

== Snooker ==
- World Snooker Tour

== Tag games ==
=== Kabaddi ===
International Tournaments

- Kabaddi World Cup

Kabaddi Leagues

- Pro Kabaddi League (India)
- Uttar Pradesh Kabaddi League (India)
- Super Kabaddi League (Pakistan) - Pakistan's first Kabaddi League. Season 01 took place in April–May 2018 and was hailed as a success.

=== Kho kho ===
- Ultimate Kho Kho (India)

== Track and field ==
- Diamond League

== Ultimate frisbee ==
United States

- American Ultimate Disc League
- Premier Ultimate League

== Video gaming/Electronic sports ==
United States

- Call of Duty League
- Evolution Championship Series
- NBA 2K League
- ESL Pro League

Asia

China

- League of Legends Pro League (top level)

India

- ESL India Premiership
- Bangalore eSports League

South Korea

- Global StarCraft II League
- League of Legends Champions Korea (top level)

Japan

- League of Legends Japan League

Philippines

- MPL Philippines
- PBA ESports Bakbakan
- The Nationals

Turkey

- ESL Turkey Premiership
- League of Legends Championship League

Multiple regions

- Halo Championship Series (United States, Europe, and Latin America)
- The International (Dota 2) (North America, Western Europe, China, Southeast Asia, South America, and Eastern Europe)
- Rocket League Championship Series (Europe, North America, Oceania, and South America)
- Overwatch Champions Series (North America, EMEA (Europe Middle East Africa), China, Korea, Japan, Pacific)

== Volleyball ==
- Angola Volleyball League
- (Australia) Australian Volleyball League
- (Australia) Australian Women's Volleyball League
- Liga Argentina de Voleibol – Serie A1
- (Argentina) Liga Femenina de Voleibol Argentino
- (Bulgaria) Bulgarian Volleyball League
- (Bulgaria) Bulgarian Women's Volleyball League
- (United States) Association of Volleyball Professionals (AVP) (beach volleyball)
- (United States) Athletes Unlimited Volleyball (AUV)
- (United States) LOVB Pro
- (United States) Major League Volleyball (MLV)
- (United States) National Volleyball Association (NVA)
- (United States) National Volleyball League (NVL)
- (United States) Volleyball League of America (VLA)
- (United Kingdom) English National Volleyball League
- (United Kingdom) English Women's National Volleyball League
- (Canada) Canadian Volleyball League (CVL)
- (Canada) National Beach Volleyball League (NBVL)
- (Austria) Austrian Volleyball Bundesliga ·
- (Austria) Austrian Women's Volley League
- Belgium Men's Volleyball League (Euro Millions Volley League)
- Belgium Women's Volleyball League (Liga A)
- (Czech Republic) Czech Men's Volleyball Extraliga
- (Czech Republic) Czech Women's Volleyball Extraliga
- (China) Chinese Volleyball Super League (CVL) (both men and women)
- (Croatia) Croatian 1A Volleyball League
- (Denmark) Danish Volleyball League
- (Denmark) Danish Women's Volleyball League
- (Netherlands) Dutch Volleyball League·
- (Netherlands) Dutch Women's Volleyball League
- (Germany) Volleyball Bundesliga der Männer
- (Germany) Volleyball-Bundesliga der Frauen
- (Hungary) Nemzeti Bajnokság I (men's volleyball)
- (Hungary) Nemzeti Bajnokság I (women's volleyball)
- (Chinese Taipei) Enterprise Volleyball League (TVL) (both men and women)
- (Greece) A1 Ethniki Volleyball (men)
- (Greece) A1 Ethniki Women's Volleyball
- (Israel) Israeli Men's Volleyball League
- (Israel) Israeli Women's Volleyball League
- Proliga (Indonesia)
  - (Indonesia) Indonesian men's Proliga
  - (Indonesia) Indonesian women's Proliga
- (India) Prime Volleyball League
- (Iran) Iranian Volleyball Super League (men)
- (Italy) Lega Pallavolo Serie A (men)
- (Italy) Lega Pallavolo Serie A Femminile (women)
- (Peru) Liga Peruana de Vóley Femenino
- (Puerto Rico) Male Superior Volleyball League (men)
- (Puerto Rico) Female Superior Volleyball League (women)
- (Philippines) Spikers' Turf (men)
- (Philippines) Premier Volleyball League (women)
- (Japan) V.League (both men and women)
- (Japan) V.Challenge League (both men and women)
- (South Korea) V-League (both men and women)
- Men's Volleyball Thailand League (men)
- (Thailand) Men's Volleyball Pro Challenge
- Women's Volleyball Thailand League
- (Thailand) Women's Volleyball Pro Challenge
- (Thailand) Volleyball Thai-Denmark Super League
- (France) Pro A (men)
- (France) French Women's Volleyball League
- (Romania) Romanian Volleyball League
- (Romania) Romanian Women's Volleyball League
- (Russia) Russian Volleyball Super League (men)
- (Russia) Russian Women's Volleyball Super League
- (Brazil) Brazilian Men's Volleyball Superliga
- (Brazil) Brazilian Women's Volleyball Superliga
- (Poland) PlusLiga (men)
- (Poland) TAURON Liga (women)
- (Slovakia) Slovakian Men's Volleyball League
- (Slovakia) Slovakian Women's Volleyball League
- (Slovenia) Slovenian Volleyball League
- (Slovenia) Slovenian Women's Volleyball League
- (Spain) Superliga de Voleibol Masculina
- (Spain) Superliga Femenina de Voleibol
- (Portugal) Portuguese Volleyball First Division
- (Portugal) First Division Women's Volleyball League
- (Montenegro) Montenegrin Volleyball League
- (Montenegro) Montenegrin women's volley league
- (Romania) Divizia A1 (men's volleyball)
- (Romania) Divizia A1 (women's volleyball)
- Volleyball Vietnam League
- Volleyball League of Serbia
- (Serbia) Serbian Women's Volleyball League
- (Sweden) Elitserien (men's volleyball)
- (Sweden) Elitserien (women's volleyball)
- (Switzerland) Swiss Volleyball League·
- (Switzerland) Swiss Women's Volleyball League
- (Norway) Norwegian Volleyball League
- (Norway) Norwegian Women's Volleyball League
- Finland Volleyball League
- (Finland) Finnish Women's Volleyball League
- (Tunisia) Tunisian Women's Volleyball League
- (Tunisia) Tunisian Men's Volleyball League
- (Turkey) Turkish Men's Volleyball League
- (Turkey) Turkish Women's Volleyball League
- (United Kingdom) UK Beach Tour
- (Ukraine) Ukrainian Men's Volleyball Super League
- (Ukraine) Ukrainian Women's Volleyball Super League
- FIVB Volleyball Men's Nations League
- FIVB Volleyball Women's Nations League
- Asian Men's Club Volleyball Championship
- Asian Women's Club Volleyball Championship
- CEV Champions League
- CEV Women's Champions League
- CEV Cup
- Women's CEV Cup
- CEV Challenge Cup
- CEV Women's Challenge Cup
- Baltic Men Volleyball League
- Baltic Women's Volleyball League
- MEVZA League
- NEVZA Clubs Championship
- African Clubs Championship (volleyball)
- Women's African Clubs Championship (volleyball)
- Arab Clubs Championship (volleyball)
- Women's Arab volleyball clubs championship

== Water polo ==
- (Australia) Australian National Water Polo League
- Bosnia and Herzegovina Water Polo League
- (Brazil) Liga Nacional (water polo)
- (Croatia) Croatian First League of Water Polo
- Championnat de France (water polo)
- Championnat de France (women's water polo)
- (Germany) Deutsche Wasserball-Liga
- (Greece) A1 Ethniki Water Polo
- (Greece) A1 Ethniki Women's Water Polo
- (Hungary) Országos Bajnokság I (men's water polo)
- (Hungary) Országos Bajnokság I (women's water polo)
- (Italy) Serie A1 (water polo)
- (Italy) Serie A2 (men's water polo)
- (Italy) Serie B (men's water polo)
- (Italy) Serie A1 (women's water polo)
- (Malta) Maltese Water Polo Premier League
- (Montenegro) Montenegrin First League of Water Polo
- (Netherlands) Dutch Men's Water Polo Championship
- (Netherlands) Dutch Women's Water Polo Championship
- (Poland) Polish Championship in Water polo
- (Portugal) Portuguese Water Polo League
- (Romania) Romanian Superliga (water polo)
- (Russia) Russian Water Polo Championship
- (Russia) Russian Women's Water Polo Championship
- (Serbia) Serbian Water Polo League A
- (Slovenia) Slovenian First League of Water Polo
- (Spain) División de Honor de Waterpolo
- (Spain) División de Honor Femenina de Waterpolo
- (Sweden) Elitserien (water polo)
- (Turkey) Türkiye Sutopu 1. Ligi
- (United Kingdom) British Water Polo League
- Regional Water Polo League (Adriatic Water Polo League)
- Nordic Water Polo League
- Asian Water Polo Clubs Championships
- LEN Champions League
- LEN Euro Cup
- LEN Super Cup
- LEN Euro League Women
- Women's LEN Trophy

== See also ==
- List of professional sports leagues in Asia
- List of defunct professional sports leagues
- List of developmental and minor sports leagues
- Major professional sports leagues in the United States and Canada
- List of professional sports teams in the United States and Canada
- List of American and Canadian cities by number of major professional sports teams
- National Collegiate Athletic Association (NCAA)
- List of sports
- List of sports attendance figures
- List of attendance figures at domestic professional sports leagues
- List of professional sports leagues by revenue
- List of largest sports contracts
