= 2017 LAF season =

2017 League of American Football
- Dates: June - September 2017
- Season: 2017
- Teams: 11
- Russkiy Bowl site: Russia
- Defending champions: Moscow Patriots
- Champions: Moscow Patriots
- Runners-up: Saint Petersburg Griffins
← 2016	2018 →

2017 LAF season is the second season of the LAF, the main competition of american football clubs in Eastern Europe. Organised by the Federation of American Football of Russia (FAFR).

Minsk Litwins and Ekaterinburg Piranhas, initially registered, did not take part in the league. The season began in May 2017 and concluded in September 2017, when Moscow Patriots won their 14th title.

== Format ==
24 clubs from 18 cities competed in 5 divisions. The best club reaching the playoffs.

== Teams ==
Geographical distribution of participants (Blue = North, Yellow = Ural, Green = Volga, Red = Premier).

Club	City
Astana Wolves	(Kazakhstan) Astana
Chelyabinsk Scouts	Chelyabinsk
Chelyabinsk Tanks	Chelyabinsk
Cyborgs Obninsk	Obninsk
(Ekaterinburg Piranhas)	Ekaterinburg
Ekaterinburg Ural Lightnings	Ekaterinburg
Izhevsk Steelworkers	Izhevsk
Yaroslavl Rebels	Yaroslavl
(Minsk Litwins)	(Belarus) Minsk
Moscow Bruins	Moscow
Moscow Dragons	Moscow
Moscow Patriots	Moscow
Moscow Spartans	Moscow
Moscow United	Moscow
Perm Steel Tigers	Perm
Petrozavodsk Karelian Gunners	Petrozavodsk
AF Podolsk Vityaz	Podolsk
Rhinos Cherepovets	Cherepovets
Samara Stormbringers	Samara
Sankt Petersburg Griffins	Sankt Petersburg
Sankt Petersburg North Legion	Sankt Petersburg
Sankt Petersburg MChS University Team	Sankt Petersburg

== Regular season ==
- % = percentage of victories, GP = Games played, W = matches won, L = lost games, GF = goals for, GA = Goals against

=== LAF North ===
Pos.	Team	%	GP	W	-	L	PF	PA
1	Petrozavodsk Karelian Gunners	1.000	4	4	0	0	147	29
2	Moscow Dragons	.750	4	3	0	1	144	32
3	Rhinos Cherepovets	.500	4	2	0	2	77	122
4	Sankt Petersburg MChS University Team	.250	4	1	0	3	46	83
5	Football Cyborgs Obninsk	.000	4	0	0	4	38	186

=== LAF Ural ===
Pos.	Team	%	GP	W	-	L	PF	PA
1	Chelyabinsk Tanks	1.000	3	3	0	0	126	7
2	Ekaterinburg Ural Lightnings	.667	3	2	0	1	98	38
3	Astana Wolves	.333	3	1	0	2	55	107
4	Chelyabinsk Scouts	.000	3	0	0	3	14	141

=== LAF Volga ===
Pos.	Team	%	GP	W	-	L	PF	PA
1	Perm Steel Tigers	1.000	4	4	0	0	162	61
2	Samara Stormbringers	.500	4	2	0	2	71	68
3	Izhevsk Steelworkers	.000	4	0	0	4	34	138

=== LAF Premier ===
Pos.	Team	%	GP	W	-	L	PF	PA
1	Moscow Spartans	1.000	7	7	0	0	244	48
2	Moscow Patriots	.857	7	6	0	1	277	20
3	Sankt Petersburg Griffins	.714	7	5	0	2	190	89
4	Sankt Petersburg North Legion	.571	7	4	0	3	152	177
5	Moscow United	.286	7	2	0	5	77	189
6	Moscow Bruins	.286	7	2	0	5	87	235
7	AF Podolsk Vityaz	.143	7	1	0	6	118	258
8	Yaroslavl Rebels	.143	7	1	0	6	131	230

== Playoff ==
Qualification Round
1N	Petrozavodsk Karelian Gunners	40
4N	Sankt Petersburg MChS University Team	0
2N	Moscow Dragons	48
3N	Rhinos Cherepovets	7
1U	Chelyabinsk Tanks	15
2U	Ekaterinburg Ural Lightnings	18

Semifinal B
1V	Perm Steel Tigers	42
1N	Petrozavodsk Karelian Gunners	39
2N	Moscow Dragons	20
2U	Ekaterinburg Ural Lightnings	12

Regions Cup Finals
1V	Perm Steel Tigers	36
2N	Moscow Dragons	6

Third Place
1N	Petrozavodsk Karelian Gunners	25
2U	Ekaterinburg Ural Lightnings	20

Semifinals
1P	Moscow Spartans	12
3P	Sankt Petersburg Griffins	13
1V	Football Perm Steel Tigers	20
2P	Moscow Patriots	37

XVIII Russkij Bowl
3P	Sankt Petersburg Griffins	6
2P	Moscow Patriots	24

== XVIII Russkij Bowl ==
Russkij Bowl
Sankt Petersburg Griffins (Sankt Petersburg)	Moscow Patriots (Moscow)
6	24
	1	2	3	4	Total
GRI	0	0	6	0	6
PAT	7	14	3	0	24
- Date: 2 September 2017
- Stadium: Sapsan Stadium, Moscow
- Referee: Kirill Chekhov
- Attendance: 1,300
