= 2018 LAF season =

2018 League of American Football
- Dates: 29 April 2018 - 1 September 2018
- Season: 2018
- Teams: 10
- Russkiy Bowl site: Russia
- Defending champions: Moscow Patriots
← 2017	2019 →

2018 LAF season is the 19th edition of the first level American football championship in Russia, organized by FAFR (Federation of American Football), and it is the 3rd edition of the League of American Football.

Moscow Patriots is the defending champion.

== Teams ==
Distribuzione geografica dei partecipanti (Giallo = Ural, Rosso = Center).

Club	City
Astana Wolves	(Kazakhstan) Astana
Chelyabinsk Tanks	Chelyabinsk
Ekaterinburg Ural Lightnings	Ekaterinburg
Yaroslavl Rebels	Yaroslavl
Moscow Dragons	Moscow
Moscow Patriots	Moscow
Moscow Spartans	Moscow
Moscow United	Moscow
Perm Steel Tigers	Perm
Sankt Petersburg Griffins	Sankt Petersburg

== Regular season ==
- % = percentage of victories, GP = Games played, W = matches won, L = lost games, GF = goals for, GA = Goals against

=== LAF Ural ===
Pos.	Team	%	GP	W	-	L	PF	PA
1	Perm Steel Tigers	1.000	6	6	0	0	168	21
2	Ekaterinburg Ural Lightnings	.500	6	3	0	3	121	126
3	Astana Wolves	.333	6	2	0	4	67	145
4	Chelyabinsk Tanks	.167	6	1	0	5	47	111

=== LAF Center ===
Pos.	Team	%	GP	W	-	L	PF	PA
1	Moscow Spartans	1.000	7	7	0	0	279	71
2	Moscow Patriots	.857	7	6	0	1	230	55
3	Sankt Petersburg Griffins	.571	7	4	0	3	222	112
4	Moscow United	.429	7	3	0	4	154	222
5	Moscow Dragons	.143	7	1	0	6	66	269
6	Yaroslavl Rebels	.000	7	0	0	7	80	302

== Playoff ==
Qualification Round
U1	Perm Steel Tigers
C5	Moscow Dragons
C4	Moscow United
U2	Ekaterinburg Ural Lightnings

Regions Cup finals

Semifinal
C2	Moscow Patriots
CR1
C1	Moscow Spartans
C3	Sankt Petersburg Griffins

XIX Russkij Bowl
Moscow Spartans
Moscow Patriots

== XIX Russkij Bowl ==
Russkij Bowl
- Date: 1 September 2018
