= 2016 LAF season =

2016 League of American Football
- Dates: April 2016 - September 2016
- Season: 2016
- Teams: 26
- Russkiy Bowl site: Sapsan Stadium; Russia
- Defending champions: Moscow Patriots
- Champions: Moscow Patriots
2017 →

2016 LAF season is the first edition of the League of American Football, the national tournament of Russia In American football.

== Format ==
26 clubs from 18 cities were participating in five regional divisions.

== Teams ==
Premier Division		North Division		Volga Division		South Division		Ural Division	
Team	City	Team	City	Team	City	Team	City	Team	City
Moscow Bruins	Moscow	Moscow Dragons	Moscow	Буревестники	Самара	Бизоны	Краснодар	Пираньи	Екатеринбург
Витязь	Подольск	Sankt Peterburg MChs University Team	Sankt Peterburg	Рэйдерс 52	Нижний Новгород	Камни	Ставрополь	Сборная Южного Урала	Челябинск
Sankt Peterburg Griffins	Sankt Peterburg	Носороги	Череповец	Фениксы	Пенза	Коршуны	Волжский	Стальные Тигры	Пермь
Minsk Litwins	Minsk	Sankt Peterburg North Legion	Sankt Peterburg			Simferopol Tavres	Simferopol	Chelyabinsk Tanks	Chelyabinsk
Moscow Patriots	Moscow					Sevastopol Titans	Sevastopol	Ekaterinburg Ural Lightnings	Ekaterinburg
Yaroslavl Rebels	Yaroslavl							Kurgan Hornets	Kurgan
Moscow Spartans	Moscow								
Moscow United	Moscow								
