= 2017 NSL 1 season =

- League: National Softball League
- Sport: Softball
- Duration: May 2017 – July 2017
- Number of games: 22
- Number of teams: 12

Regular Season

NSL National Championships

NSL seasons
- ← 2016 2018 →

The 2017 NSL 1 season will be the 9th season of play of the National Softball League. NSL 1 will operate for the 2nd year with pre-determined fixture lists and will share diamond space with NSL 2 at Farnham Park Baseball and Softball Complex during the Diamond Series tournaments.

The top 8 teams during regular season play will compete at the 2017 BSF NSL National Championships on the weekend September 2-3 for the title of 2017 National Champion.

== League business ==
=== Teams ===
During winter 2016-17 longtime NSL team Slammers decided they would not enter a team into the 2017 NSL 1 competition and so LNZ were saved from relegation to NSL 2. Manchester Dodgers won promotion from NSL 2 in 2016.

Bristol Bees club separated into two distinct teams for the 2017 season and the NSL 1 team will compete as Bristol NSL, leaving the NSL 2 team to compete as Bristol Bees.

== Regular season ==
=== Dates ===
The NSL 1 competition will take place across the three Diamond Series tournaments, May 13-14, June 10-11 and July 29-30.

== Standings ==
TBC
