= Austrian Women's Volleyball Cup =

Volleyball in Austria

- Sport: Volleyball
- Founded: 1981
- Administrator: ÖVV
- Country: Austria
- Continent: Europe
- Most recent champion: Schwechat 26th Title
- Most titles: Schwechat 26 Titles
- Website: http://www.volleyleague.at/

The Austrian Women's Volleyball Cup is an Austrian women's Volleyball Cup competition held every single year and it is organized by the Austrian Volleyball Federation (Österreichischen Volleyballverband-ÖVV), it was established in 1980.

== Competition Format ==
The competition is played in a knockout format on an autumn–spring schedule. The winners of the two semi-finals advance to the final, where they compete for the Cup.

In the 2025/26 Cup final, Linz Steelvolleys defeated Niederösterreich-Sokol-Post 3–0

== Winners list ==
| Years | Winners | Score | Runners-up |
|---|---|---|---|
| 1981 | POST SV Vienna | | |
| 1982 | POST SV Vienna | | |
| 1983 | IAC/ITV Innsbruck | | |
| 1984 | IAC/ITV Innsbruck | | |
| 1985 | POST SV Vienna | | |
| 1986 | POST SV Vienna | | |
| 1987 | POST SV Vienna | | |
| 1988 | UVC Wüstenrot Salzburg | | |
| 1989 | POST SV Vienna | | |
| 1990 | POST SV Vienna | | |
| 1991 | UVC Wüstenrot Salzburg | | |
| 1992 | ATSC Wildcats Klagenfurt | | |
| 1993 | | | |
| 1994 | POST SV Vienna | | |
| 1995 | POST SV Vienna | | |
| 1996 | POST SV Vienna | | |
| 1997 | PSV Gulet Vienna | | |
| 1998 | Fujitsu POST SV Vienna | | |
| 1999 | Fujitsu POST SV Vienna | | |
| 2000 | POST Telekom Austria Vienna | | |
| 2001 | POST Vienna | | |
| 2002 | SVS Telekom Schwechat | | |
| 2003 | SG SVS PSV Kuoni | | |
| 2004 | ATSC Wildcats Klagenfurt | 3 - 0 (25-23, 25-21, 25-21) | SG SVS PSV Kuoni |
| 2005 | SG SVS PSV Kuoni | 3 - 1 (25-23, 25-19, 18-25, 25-12) | ATSC Wildcats Klagenfurt |
| 2006 | SG SVS Post | 3 - 2 (21-25, 19-25, 25-23, 25-21, 15-13) | ATSC Wildcats Klagenfurt |
| 2007 | ATSC Wildcats Klagenfurt | 3 - 2 (15-25, 25-22, 15-25, 25-20, 15-13) | SVS Post |
| 2008 | ASKÖ Fabasoft Linz-Steg | 3 - 1 (25-23, 28-26, 12-25, 25-20) | SG SVS Post |
| 2009 | ASKÖ Fabasoft Linz-Steg | 3 - 1 (25-17, 25-12, 23-25, 25-12) | SG TI-Volley |
| 2010 | SG SVS Post | 3 - 2 (19-25, 25-19, 22-25, 25-13, 15-8) | TSV Sparkasse Hartberg |
| 2011 | ASKÖ Linz-Steg | 3 - 0 (25-19, 25-16, 28-26) | ATSC Sparkasse Wildcats Klagenfurt |
| 2012 | SG SVS Post | 3 - 0 (25-15, 25-19, 25-12) | TSV Sparkasse Hartberg |
| 2013 | SG SVS Post | 3 - 0 (25-22, 25-18, 25-19) | TSV Sparkasse Hartberg |
| 2014 | SG SVS Post | 3 - 1 (25-18, 20-25, 25-21, 25-18) | ATSC Sparkasse Wildcats Klagenfurt |
| 2015 | SVS Post Schwechat | 3 - 0 (25-22, 25-21, 25-16) | ATSC Sparkasse Wildcats Klagenfurt |
| 2016 | SG SVS Post SV | 3 - 2 (21-25, 23-25, 25-22, 25-18, 15-9) | UVC Holding Graz |
| 2017 | UVC Holding Graz | 3 - 0 (25-21, 25-12, 25-21) | SG WSV Eisenerz/VBV Trofaiach |
| 2018 | UVC Holding Graz | 3 - 0 (25-20, 25-22, 25-18) | SG VB NÖ Sokol/Post |
| 2019 | ASKÖ Linz-Steg | 3 - 0 (25-16, 25-19, 25-14) | ATSC Wildcats Klagenfurt |
| 2020 | ASKÖ Linz-Steg | 3 - 2 (19-25, 25-19, 15-25, 25-21, 15-13) | UVC Holding Graz |
| 2021 | ASKÖ Linz-Steg | 3 - 1 (25-17, 18-25, 25-13, 25-23) | UVC Holding Graz |
| 2022 | | | |
