= 2016 NSL 1 season =

- League: National Softball League
- Sport: Softball
- Duration: May 2016 – September 2016
- Number of games: 22
- Number of teams: 12

Regular Season
- NSL 1 Winner: Pioneers

NSL National Championships
- Champions: Pioneers
- Runners-up: H_{2}O

NSL seasons
- ← 2015 2017 →

The 2016 NSL 1 season was the 8th season of play of the National Softball League. NSL 1 operated for the 1st year with pre-determined fixture lists ran during the Diamond Series tournaments.

The top 8 teams during regular season qualified for the 2016 BSF NSL National Championships which was won by Pioneers who beat H_{2}O in the final which was streamed live by WebcastSport.

== League business ==
=== Teams ===
After the 2015 season it was decided that the NSL would be cut to 12 teams from 14. This meant that Maniacs and Warriors the two lowest finishing teams were removed from the NSL for the 2015 season.

Warriors would compete as part of the newly formed NSL 2 in 2015, whereas Maniacs disbanded as a team altogether.

== Regular season ==
=== Dates ===
The NSL 1 competition took place across the first two Diamond Series tournaments and Windsor Tournament.

== Standings ==
Pos	Team	W	L	T	Pct	GB	RF	RA	Qualification
1	Pioneers	17	5	0	0.733	-	233	123	Qualified for the 2016 NSL Nationals
2	H_{2}O	16	5	1	0.750	0.5	242	149	Qualified for the 2016 NSL Nationals
3	Chromies	13	7	2	0.636	3	215	169	Qualified for the 2016 NSL Nationals
4	Blue Steel	13	8	1	0.614	3.5	198	154	Qualified for the 2016 NSL Nationals
5	Windsor Knights	12	9	1	0.569	4.5	172	165	Qualified for the 2016 NSL Nationals
6	Legends	12	10	0	0.545	5	198	163	Qualified for the 2016 NSL Nationals
7	Thunder	8	10	4	0.456	7	186	176	Qualified for the 2016 NSL Nationals
8	Slammers	10	12	0	0.455	7	128	195	Qualified for the 2016 NSL Nationals
9	Greensox	6	13	3	0.341	9.5	152	201	
10	Leeds Terriers	6	13	3	0.341	9.5	168	220	
11	Bristol Bees	6	16	0	0.273	11	154	220	
12	LNZ	5	16	1	0.250	11.5	117	228	Relegated to NSL 2
