= Maindsher Kyiv =

- Full name: FC Maindsher Kyiv
- Short name: Maindsher
- Founded: 2002
- Owner: Maindsher
- Chairman: (Ukraine) Valeriy Varenytsia
- Coach: (Ukraine) Yevhen Varenytsia
| Home colours | Away colours |

Maindsher Kyiv (Ukrainian: "Майндшер" Київ) has a professional beach soccer team based in Kyiv, Ukraine. It was founded at 2002.

== Honours ==
=== Ukrainian competitions ===
- Ukrainian Beach Soccer Premier League

- Winners: 2003, 2006, 2009, 2012;
- Runners-up: 2002, 2005, 2008, 2010, 2011;
- Third place: 2004.

== Notable former players ==
- (Ukraine) Vitaliy Sydorenko
- (Ukraine) Oleh Zborovskyi
