= Austrian Women's Volley League =

Austrian Volleyball League
- Current season, competition or edition: 2019–20 Austrian Women's Volleyball League
- Sport: Volleyball
- Founded: 1953
- First season: 1953
- Administrator: ÖVV
- No. of teams: 10 (2019–20)
- Country: Austria
- Continent: Europe
- Most recent champion: ASKÖ Linz-Steg (1st title)
- Most titles: VB NÖ Sokol (46 titles)
- Level on pyramid: 1
- Relegation to: 2nd League
- Domestic cups: Austrian Cup; Austrian Super Cup
- International cups: CEV Champions League; CEV Cup; CEV Challenge Cup
- Website: http://www.volleyleague.at/

The Austrian Volley League Women (AVL), formerly known as the Women VolleyLeague (WVL), is the 1st women's volleyball league in Austria and it is a part of the Austrian Volleyball Association. It is organized as an Independent association since 2002.

== League Mode ==
The Austrian Volley League for Women is divided into the following phases

- Main passage
- Master playoff
- Relegation
- U21 competition

The Main passage has a maximum of ten participants, including the two volleyball teams participating in the Central European Volleyball League (Central European Volleyball Zonal Association (MEVZA), play in a main round placement mode for the qualification of the play-off-Phase.

== Master play-offs ==
The quarter-finals and semi-finals take place in the best of five mode. The team with the better placement in the main round has the home advantage in the first game, then it changes with every game. The final takes place in the best of seven mode game.

A special feature of the Austrian Volley League is that the losers teams in the quarter-finals play for placement from 5 to 8 place.

The losers in the semi-finals also play for the Third place. All games for 3rd to 8th place will be played in best of three mode.

== Round of Expectations ==
The last four teams of the main round play in the Austrian Volley League for Women an Expectations Round between each other with two teams remain in the 1st Tier and two teams descending to the 2nd League.

== Relegation ==
In the relegation, teams from the Expectations Round, 2. Bundesliga North and South meet.

== Under-21 competition ==
In a weekend tournament, a maximum of ten teams play the Austrian championship title in this class.

== List of Champions ==
Years	Champions
1953	TJ Sokol V Wien
1954	TJ Sokol V Wien
1955	TJ Sokol V Wien
1956	TJ Sokol V Wien
1957	TJ Sokol V Wien
1958	TJ Sokol V Wien
1959	TJ Sokol V Wien
1960	ÖMV Olympia Wien
1961	SK Slovan-Olympia Wien
1962	SK Slovan-Olympia Wien
1963	SK Slovan-Olympia Wien
1964	SK Slovan-Olympia Wien
1965	SC ÖMV Blau-Gelb Wien
1966	SK Slovan-Olympia Wien
1967	SC ÖMV Blau-Gelb Wien
1968	SC ÖMV Blau-Gelb Wien
1969	SC ÖMV Blau-Gelb Wien
1970	SC ÖMV Blau-Gelb Wien
1971	SC ÖMV Blau-Gelb Wien
1972	SC ÖMV Blau-Gelb Wien
1973	Post SV Wien
1974	Post SV Wien
1975	Post SV Wien
1976	Post SV Wien

Years	Champions
1977	Post SV Wien
1978	Post SV Wien
1979	SC ÖMV Blau-Gelb Wien
1980	SC ÖMV Blau-Gelb Wien
1981	SC ÖMV Blau-Gelb Wien
1982	SC ÖMV Blau-Gelb Wien
1983	TJ Sokol V Wien
1984	Post SV Wien
1985	Post SV Wien
1986	SG Innsbrucker AC/TV
1987	Post SV Wien
1988	Post SV Wien
1989	Post SV Wien-P.S.K.
1990	Post SV Wien-P.S.K.
1991	Post SV Wien-Teleges
1992	Post SV Wien-Teleges
1993	SG UVC/Wüstenrot Salzburg
1994	Post SV Wien-Teleges
1995	Post SV Wien-Gulet
1996	Post SV Wien-Gulet
1997	Post SV Wien-Gulet
1998	Fujitsu-Post SV Wien
1999	Fujitsu-Post SV Wien
2000	Post SV-Telekom Austria

Years	Champions
2001	Post SV Wien
2002	SG SV Schwechat/PSV Telekom
2003	SG SV Schwechat/PSV Kuoni
2004	SG SV Schwechat/PSV Kuoni
2005	SG SV Schwechat/PSV Kuoni
2006	SG SV Schwechat/Post SV
2007	SG SV Schwechat/Post SV
2008	SG SV Schwechat/Post SV
2009	SG SV Schwechat/Post SV
2010	SG SVS Post
2011	SG SVS Post
2012	SG SVS Post
2013	SG SVS Post
2014	SG SVS Post
2015	SG SVS Post
2016	SG SVS Post
2017	SG VB NÖ Sokol/Post
2018	UVC Holding Graz
2019	ASKÖ Linz-Steg
2020	ASKÖ Linz-Steg
2021	ASKÖ Linz-Steg
2022	ASKÖ Linz-Steg
2023	
2024	
