= 2017 Men's Volleyball Pro Challenge =

- League: Pro Challenge
- Sport: Volleyball
- Duration: July 29, 2017 – September 17, 2017
- Games: 21
- Teams: 7
- Season champions: Khon Kaen Municipality (1st title)

Men's Volleyball Pro Challenge seasons
- ← 2015 2018 →

The 2017 Men's Volleyball Pro Challenge was the seventh season of the League since its establishment in 2011. It is the feeder league for the Volleyball Thailand League. A total of seven teams competed in the league this season.

== Team ==
- Cosmo Chiang Rai VC
- Khon Kaen Municipality VC
- Nakhonnont VC
- RSU VC
- Sisaket
- Sponxel–MS VC
- Strong Wings–Chiang Mai

== Ranking ==
Pos	Team	Pld	W	L	Pts	SW	SL	SR	SPW	SPL	SPR
1	Khon Kaen Municipality	6	5	1	15	16	3	5.333	485	370	1.311
2	Cosmo Chiang Rai	6	5	1	15	17	6	2.833	547	491	1.114
3	Nakhonnont	6	5	1	14	15	7	2.143	541	481	1.125
4	Sisaket	6	3	3	9	9	9	1.000	388	403	0.963
5	Strong Wings–Chiang Mai	6	2	4	7	9	13	0.692	471	472	0.998
6	Sponxel–MS	6	1	5	3	3	16	0.188	390	452	0.863
7	RSU	6	0	6	0	3	18	0.167	361	514	0.702

== Results ==
=== Week 1 ===
Date	Time		Score		Set 1	Set 2	Set 3	Set 4	Set 5	Total	Report
29 Jul	15:00	RSU	0–3	Cosmo Chiang Rai	14–25	21–25	20–25			55–75	
29 Jul	16:30	Khon Kaen Municipality	3–0	Sponxel–MS	25–17	25–21	25–17			75–55	
30 Jul	15:00	Sponxel–MS	0–3	Sisaket	20–25	23–25	21–25			64–75	
30 Jul	16:30	RSU	1–3	Strong Wings–Chiang Mai	21–25	25–21	17–25	13–25		76–96	

=== Week 2 ===
Date	Time		Score		Set 1	Set 2	Set 3	Set 4	Set 5	Total	Report
5 Aug	12:00	RSU	1–3	Sponxel–MS	25–22	23–25	14–25	15–25		77–97	
5 Aug	13:30	Nakhonnont	0–3	Khon Kaen Municipality	28–30	20–25	29–31			77–86	
6 Aug	12:00	Cosmo Chiang Rai	2–3	Nakhonnont	25–19	33–31	21–25	27–29	12–15	118–119	
6 Aug	13:30	Sisaket	3–0	Strong Wings–Chiang Mai	25–22	25–21	25–18			75–61	

=== Week 3 ===
Date	Time		Score		Set 1	Set 2	Set 3	Set 4	Set 5	Total	Report
12 Aug	15:00	Cosmo Chiang Rai	3–1	Khon Kaen Municipality	31–29	16–25	25–22	25–23		97–99	
12 Aug	16:30	Nakhonnont	3–1	Strong Wings–Chiang Mai	25–22	25–19	24–26	25–17		99–84	
13 Aug	15:00	RSU	1–3	Nakhonnont	25–23	16–25	14–25	17–25		72–98	
13 Aug	16:30	Cosmo Chiang Rai	3–0	Sisaket	25–17	25–17	25–20			75–54	

=== Week 4 ===
Date	Time		Score		Set 1	Set 2	Set 3	Set 4	Set 5	Total	Report
9 Sep	10:30	RSU	0–3	Khon Kaen Municipality	14–25	8–25	15–25			37–75	
9 Sep	12:00	Cosmo Chiang Rai	3–0	Sponxel–MS	25–23	25–19	25–20			75–62	
9 Sep	13:30	Nakhonnont	3–0	Sisaket	25–20	25–22	25–15			75–57	
10 Sep	12:00	Khon Kaen Municipality	3–0	Sisaket	25–17	25–18	25–17			75–52	
10 Sep	13:30	Sponxel–MS	0–3	Strong Wings–Chiang Mai	14–25	22–25	12–25			48–75	

=== Week 5 ===
Date	Time		Score		Set 1	Set 2	Set 3	Set 4	Set 5	Total	Report
16 Sep	15:00	Nakhonnont	3–0	Sponxel–MS	25–21	25–23	25–20			75–64	
16 Sep	16:30	Khon Kaen Municipality	3–0	Strong Wings–Chiang Mai	25–16	25–19	25–17			75–52	
17 Sep	15:00	RSU	0–3	Sisaket	20–25	18–25	14–25			52–75	
17 Sep	16:30	Cosmo Chiang Rai	3–2	Strong Wings–Chiang Mai	21–25	26–24	20–25	25–17	15–11	107–102	

== Final standing ==
Rank	Team
1st place, gold medalist(s)	Khon Kaen Municipality
2nd place, silver medalist(s)	Cosmo Chiang Rai
3rd place, bronze medalist(s)	Nakhonnont
4	Sisaket
5	Strong Wings–Chiang Mai
6	Sponxel–MS
7	RSU VC

Promotion to 2017–18 Volleyball Thailand League

2017 Men's Volleyball Pro Challenge

1st title

== See also ==
- 2017 Women's Volleyball Pro Challenge
