= Croatian League of American Football =

Croatian League of American Football (Hrvatska Liga Američkog Nogometa)
- Sport: American football
- Founded: 2008; 18 years ago
- Founder: Croatian Federation of American Football
- First season: 2008
- CEO: Dragutin Funda
- No. of teams: 7
- Country: Croatia
- Most recent champion: Split Sea Wolves (8th title)
- Most titles: Split Sea Wolves (8)
- Website: HSAN Online

The Croatian League of American Football (Croatian: Hrvatska Liga Američkog Nogometa) is a national american football competition in Croatia that was first held in 2008 by the Croatian Federation of American Football.

== Teams ==
- Banja Luka Rebels
- Dubrovnik Sharks
- Osijek Cannons
- Sarajevo Spartans
- Split Sea Wolves
- Tuzla Saltminers
- Zagreb Patriots

=== Former teams ===
- Bjelovar Greenhorns
- Teutoburgium Pitbulls
- Zagreb Thunder
- Zagreb Raiders
- Zaprešić Saints

== CroBowl winners ==
#	Year	Champion	Opponent	Result
I.	2010	Teutoburgium Pitbulls	Zagreb Thunder	6–0
II.	2012	Zagreb Patriots	Zagreb Raiders	61–0
III.	2013	Zagreb Raiders	Zagreb Thunder	42–0
IV.	2015	Osijek Cannons	Zagreb Patriots	13–7
V.	2016	Split Sea Wolves	Osijek Cannons	16–0
VI.	2017	Split Sea Wolves	Zaprešić Saints	9–7
VII	2018	Zagreb Patriots	Split Sea Wolves	16–13
VIII	2019	Split Sea Wolves	Dubrovnik Sharks	
IX	2020	Split Sea Wolves	Dubrovnik Sharks	
X	2021	Split Sea Wolves	Zagreb Patriots	
XI	2022	Split Sea Wolves	Dubrovnik Sharks	
XII	2023	Split Sea Wolves	Zagreb Patriots	44–31
XIII	2024	Split Sea Wolves	Dubrovnik Sharks	24–18
