= Glasnost Bowl =

Cancelled American football game in the Soviet Union

The Glasnost Bowl was a planned attempt to stage an American college football game in Moscow, USSR at the beginning of the 1989 season. The game was named after the policy of glasnost ("openness") introduced by Soviet leader Mikhail Gorbachev in 1985. Scheduled for the Dynamo Stadium, the game was similar to the Mirage Bowl/Coca-Cola Classic, a college football game being played annually in Tokyo, Japan at the time, with plans to have it be an annual contest with different participants each year.

Organized by Raycom Sports, the game was scheduled between the University of Southern California Trojans and the University of Illinois Fighting Illini to open their regular seasons. Arrangements were made for a network telecast back to the United States, and airplanes were chartered for fans to fly to the Soviet Union. However, due to complications, the game was rescheduled for Los Angeles, California as a USC home game at the Los Angeles Memorial Coliseum.

== History ==
The attempt to use Moscow as the venue for an American football game can be viewed as an element of intense dialogue among Russians and Americans in the late 1980s. This exchange dialogue cut across many elements of culture and served as an important step in the political transitions leading to present day Russia.

=== Early planning ===
On October 18, 1988, Rick Ray, CEO of Raycom, announced an agreement with Sovintersport, a division of the Soviet Ministry of Sports and Physical Culture, to hold "The Glasnost Bowl", a regular-season opening game between two American college football teams. The announcement was the culmination of five years of negotiations with the Soviet authorities and a positive step in U.S.-Soviet relations, especially in light of the decade's previous American-led boycott of the 1980 Summer Olympics in Moscow and Soviet-led boycott of the 1984 Summer Olympics in Los Angeles.

Scheduled for September 2, 1989, the chosen site was Moscow's Dynamo Stadium, a soccer facility in the northwest of the city with a then-stadium capacity of 50,000 persons (it currently has a 36,540 person capacity). The game planners hoped for 3,500 fans from each school, plus school marching bands and cheerleaders, as well as 43,000 Soviet spectators. In addition to the United States, Raycom planned to broadcast the game in the United Kingdom, Japan, New Zealand, and Australia; the Soviets planned to broadcast to republics of the Soviet Union and the Eastern bloc via the state-run Gostelradio. The agreement between Raycom and Sovintersport had the Soviets keeping profits from their telecast, Raycom taking profits from the U.S. telecast and travel packages, and a split of the stadium gate (although tickets at the gate were planned for the equivalent of $1). Additionally, the two sides agreed to broadcast a five-minute instructional video to be shown on Soviet television during the months before the game: explaining the basic rules, positions, "When do you cheer at a football game?", and other basics.

The participating teams were not immediately selected, and a number of major Division I-A college football programs took interest in taking part in the historic game, including Florida, University of Miami, Florida State, Penn State, Alabama, Texas, and UCLA. With the relatively short notice, interested teams needed to rearrange their schedules as the NCAA did not grant the game an exception to its then-rule permitting only 11 regular season games. To help encourage teams, Raycom offered US$300,000 to participating schools; however, the logistics remained difficult. Some teams, like Miami, were concerned about playing a difficult game abroad; others, like Florida, were unable to get out of previously scheduled games. Teams like Wisconsin and Penn State were concerned about losing a home game and the extra income generated by such games (in some cases over $1 million). Also, with the game to be broadcast on ABC, teams in the Southeastern Conference, like Florida, had to further sort out complications with their exclusive television contract with TBS. By early November, the field of candidates was reduced to USC and Illinois: Kansas was willing to release USC from its commitment during that week and Illinois was open to having Raycom buy out one of its already scheduled games. The match-up was officially confirmed on November 15.

=== Planning a game in the Soviet Union ===
Even with the teams set, the logistics of hosting the first American football game in the Soviet Union proved challenging. Soviet officials were not used to the requirements of major American football teams: i.e., the locker rooms in the stadium were designed for 16-player soccer teams, not football teams with over 75 personnel, and Soviet stadiums did not have communications between booths and the field commonly used by coordinators. Some Soviets were even interested if anyone was ever killed during the games. In addition, Dynamo Stadium's grass field was 10 yards too short to meet football specifications. Plans were made in case any unexpected flare-up in the fading Cold War prevented the game from being played in the Soviet Union; the contingency plan had the game to be moved to Los Angeles and USC's home stadium, the Los Angeles Memorial Coliseum, with Illinois still splitting the gate.

However, despite these initial concerns, the general mood was optimistic. Both sides wanted the game to work. The kickoff was set for 8 p.m., Moscow time, and televised live in the U.S. at 9 a.m., Pacific time. ABC assigned a veteran group of sportscasters with Keith Jackson, Bob Griese, and Mike Adamle. Raycom agreed to bring in AstroTurf for the stadium. The American media regularly touched on the novelty of the event, citing the shared colors of the Trojans uniforms and the Soviet flag and the name of Illinois' legendary Red Grange.

Illinois rewarded 14 graduating seniors from its 1988 team to join them at the game the next year at the university's expense. While the Trojans' Spirit of Troy marching band and cheerleaders were scheduled to make the trip, USC needed to adapt its mascot, Traveler, a white horse with Trojan-costumed rider, by sending the rider and substituting a local Russian white horse. The game also survived a February–March 1989 legal battle between American promoters involved with Raycom.

Illinois head coach John Mackovic, USC head coach Larry Smith and their staffs visited Moscow in Spring 1989 to plan around the facilities and accommodations; the Soviet officials remained worried about the violence of the game, asking if ten ambulances were enough. The teams realized that they needed to bring all the necessary equipment for a major college football match-up: including footballs, goal posts, play clocks, cooks, a large amount of food (2,000 pounds (910 kg) per team), and a large quantity of ice needed for treating football related strains and injuries. The plan had the teams flying by chartered jets from Los Angeles and Chicago to Moscow on August 28, having two days of practice before the game, sightseeing after the game, and then returning on September 4. Travel packages for fans, including airfare and hotel, were sold starting at $2,595.

Like the Olympics, the game itself became a political football for thawing relations between the superpowers: American Congressional personnel and agencies at both the state and federal level showed interest in participation, along with Soviet counterparts in their foreign ministries. Tentative plans were already being developed for the second Glasnost Bowl, between Miami and Penn State. Illinois baseball coach Augie Garrido suggested creating a two-sport doubleheader with both universities' baseball teams preceding the game.

=== Plans collapse ===
On June 8, just three months before the game, the Los Angeles Herald Examiner broke the surprise bad news: the Glasnost Bowl in Moscow was canceled by Raycom. All sides expressed deep disappointment in the result. Raycom CEO Rick Ray cited "contractual concerns" over the previous weeks for the cancellation that were not resolved to their satisfaction, specifically citing arrangements for hotel rooms and transportation. While all involved expected and accepted facilities and accommodations that were not up to normal requirements, serious questions arose as to whether such needs could be delivered in the required numbers. Raycom agreed to returning all sold travel packages, with interest, to those who had made arrangements to go to Moscow. By far the largest stumbling block was the Soviet authorities' inability to guarantee the required number of hotel rooms and lack of communication from the Soviet side. The Soviet authorities told Raycom that they could not assure the number of hotel rooms in the contract, or the locations previously agreed upon, and asked for a delay in negotiations. Additionally, Raycom was not selling its tour packages as well as it had hoped: as of mid-May, fewer than 1,000 of over 3,000 packages had been sold. A contributing factor was the price for the six-day, five-night trip, which was considerably higher than most Soviet tours which offered even more. Raycom, faced with the potential of large financial losses, decided it could no longer move forward and cancelled the game.

Indeed, a lack of inter-cultural experience on both sides combined with the traditional Byzantine Soviet bureaucracy and way of business proved to be the dooming factors for the game. Just to form the "final" game contract, Raycom officials met with six different sets of Soviet negotiating teams, signing at last on April 27 in Moscow – nine months after the game was first announced. Executives at Raycom felt in the end that the game was a few years premature given the changes occurring in the Soviet Union at the time.

As per the original contract plans, the game was immediately shifted to the Coliseum, with USC agreeing to eventually play Illinois at home in Champaign, Illinois; ABC still decided to carry the game, moving it to the Labor Day holiday. The game was played in Los Angeles on September 4, with the #22-ranked Fighting Illini upsetting the #5 Trojans by a score of 14 to 13 in a tight contest before an attendance of 54,622. The teams finally played the second half of the home-and-home arrangement seven years later: On September 7, 1996, the #19 Trojans routed the Illini, 55–3, in front of 56,504 at Memorial Stadium.

=== High school games ===
Shortly after the collapse of plans for the Glasnost Bowl, plans were made by 90 high school players from Oklahoma to pay their own way and play three "all-star" exhibition games (with the teams named the "Stars" and "Boomers") in Moscow, Leningrad, and Tallinn, Estonia in 1989. These were the first organized American football games played in the Soviet Union. Shortly after these games the Soviet national American football team formed, as well as the first Soviet league, marking the start of domestic American football in the Soviet Union and Russia.
