= 2011 Turkish Futsal League =

Turkish Futsal League in 2011.

== Standings ==
The tournament consists of Eastern and Western regional tournaments, the top two teams from each group will play the Final Four to determine the champion.

=== Western Group ===
Pos	Team	Pld	W	D	L	GF	GA	GD	Pts
1	Çamlaraltı Koleji Ege Elitspor	3	3	0	0	25	13	+12	9
2	Istanbul University	3	3	0	0	17	8	+9	9
3	Uludağ Üniversitesi	3	2	0	1	25	15	+10	6
4	Kocaeli University	3	2	0	1	19	23	−4	6
5	Gazi University	3	1	0	2	16	18	−2	3
6	İzmir Büyükşehir Bld. Spor	3	1	0	2	19	2	+17	3
7	Sprint Spor	3	0	0	3	10	17	−7	0
8	Anadolu Gençlik Spor Kulübü	3	0	0	3	14	29	−15	0

=== Eastern Group ===
Pos	Team	Pld	W	D	L	GF	GA	GD	Pts
1	İnönü Üniversitesi	3	3	0	0	29	13	+16	9
2	Atatürk Lisesi Spor Kulübü	2	2	0	0	10	6	+4	6
3	Seyhan Bld. Spor	2	1	1	0	14	10	+4	4
4	Samsun Ondokuz Mayıs University	3	1	1	1	13	12	+1	4
5	Trabzon Hekimoğlu Doğan Spor	3	1	0	2	17	18	−1	3
6	Gençlik Spor 24R	3	1	0	2	17	21	−4	3
7	Ağrı İbrahim Çeçen University	1	0	0	1	6	7	−1	0
8	Erciş Bld. Spor	3	0	0	3	16	30	−14	0

== See also ==
- Turkey national futsal team
