= Euroformat Kyiv =

- Full name: FC Euroformat Kyiv
- Short name: Euroformat
- Chairman: (Ukraine) Volodymyr Lytvyshchenko
- Coach: (Ukraine) Serhiy Kucherenko
Home colours
Away colours

Euroformat Kyiv (Ukrainian: "Євроформат" Київ) has a professional beach soccer team based in Kyiv, Ukraine. Prior to 2011, Euroformat was called New Era. The club was organized by company Euroformat.

== Honours ==
=== Ukrainian competitions ===
- Ukrainian Beach Soccer Premier League
  - Winners: 2004, 2005, 2007, 2011

== Notable former players ==
- (Ukraine) Andriy Borsuk
