= 2014 Men's Volleyball Pro Challenge =

2014 Men's Volleyball Division 2
- Sport: Volleyball
- Founded: 2011
- No. of teams: 7
- Country: Thailand
- Most recent champion: Wing 46 Toyota-Phitsanulok

The 2014 Men's Volleyball Division 2 is the highest level of Thailand club volleyball in the 2014 season and the 4th edition.

== Team ==
1. (Thailand) 3 Orchids–Makkasan VC
2. (Thailand) IAM CMU VC
3. (Thailand) Maejo University VC
4. (Thailand) MTB. 11–Chainat VC
5. (Thailand) Phetchaburi VC
6. (Thailand) Sanpawut–Saraburi–Thai-Denmark VC
7. (Thailand) Wing 46 Toyota-Phitsanulok

== Ranking ==
Pos	Team	Pld	W	L	Pts	SW	SL	SR	SPW	SPL	SPR
1	Wing 46 Toyota-Phitsanulok	6	6	0	18	18	2	9.000	504	388	1.299
2	Phetchaburi VC	6	4	2	12	13	8	1.625	476	442	1.077
3	IAM CMU VC	6	4	2	12	13	10	1.300	534	519	1.029
4	Sanpawut–Saraburi–Thai-Denmark VC	6	3	3	9	12	10	1.200	500	497	1.006
5	Maejo University VC	6	2	4	6	8	13	0.615	463	470	0.985
6	3 Orchids–Makkasan VC	6	2	4	6	7	13	0.538	435	462	0.942
7	MTB. 11–Chainat VC	6	0	6	0	3	18	0.167	386	520	0.742

=== Note ===
Grading 2014 Men's Volleyball Division 2 Standings following order.

- 1. Teams win most matches.
- 2. Winning matches equally. Team with an overall win - win (3-0,3-1 win team win 3 points, loser no points, winning 3-2 team win 2 points, the losing team 1 point).
- 3. Overall lost - win ratio set as well.
- 4. Ratio set up / set the ratio equal to all points.
- 5. Teams ranked 1-2 to advance to the Volleyball Thailand League.

== Preliminary round ==
Date	Time		Score		Set 1	Set 2	Set 3	Set 4	Set 5	Total
9 Jul	16:30	MTB. 11–Chainat VC	1–3	3 Orchids–Makkasan VC	19–25	16–25	25–23	12–25		72–98
10 Jul	16:30	Wing 46 Toyota-Phitsanulok	3–0	MTB. 11–Chainat VC	25–12	25–13	25–16			75–41
11 Jul	15:00	IAM CMU VC	3–1	MTB. 11–Chainat VC	25–19	25–27	25–22	25–14		100–82
11 Jul	16:30	Wing 46 Toyota-Phitsanulok	3–0	3 Orchids–Makkasan VC	26–24	25–15	25–22			76–61
12 Jul	15:00	IAM CMU VC	0–3	Phetchaburi VC	15–25	23–25	20–25			58–75
12 Jul	16:30	Sanpawut–Saraburi–Thai-Denmark VC	3–0	MTB. 11–Chainat VC	26–20	25–17	25–21			75–58
13 Jul	15:00	Phetchaburi VC	0–3	Wing 46 Toyota-Phitsanulok	18–25	20–25	18–25			56–75
13 Jul	16:30	IAM CMU VC	3–1	Sanpawut–Saraburi–Thai-Denmark VC	25–23	25–20	23–25	25–16		98–84
14 Jul	15:00	IAM CMU VC	1–3	Wing 46 Toyota-Phitsanulok	22–25	14–25	27–25	20–25		83–100
14 Jul	16:30	3 Orchids–Makkasan VC	0–3	Phetchaburi VC	22–25	11–25	18–25			51–75
15 Jul	15:00	Maejo University VC	3–0	MTB. 11–Chainat VC	25–19	25–14	25–14			75–47
15 Jul	16:30	Wing 46 Toyota-Phitsanulok	3–1	Sanpawut–Saraburi–Thai-Denmark VC	25–20	18–25	25–14	35–33		103–92
16 Jul	15:00	Maejo University VC	1–3	Sanpawut–Saraburi–Thai-Denmark VC	22–25	17–25	20–25	20–25		82–97
16 Jul	16:30	3 Orchids–Makkasan VC	1–3	IAM CMU VC	22–25	16–25	25–21	25–27		88–98
17 Jul	15:00	Maejo University VC	3–1	Phetchaburi VC	25–18	20–25	25–11	25–20		95–76
17 Jul	16:30	3 Orchids–Makkasan VC	0–3	Sanpawut–Saraburi–Thai-Denmark VC	15–25	24–26	20–25			59–75
18 Jul	15:00	Phetchaburi VC	3–1	Sanpawut–Saraburi–Thai-Denmark VC	25–17	22–25	25–13	25–25		97–77
18 Jul	16:30	Maejo University VC	1–3	IAM CMU VC	25–22	22–25	23–25	20–25		90–97
19 Jul	16:30	Maejo University VC	0–3	3 Orchids–Makkasan VC	18–25	22–25	26–28			66–78
20 Jul	15:00	Phetchaburi VC	3–1	MTB. 11–Chainat VC	25–22	25–22	22–25	25–17		97–86
20 Jul	16:30	Wing 46 Toyota-Phitsanulok	3–0	Maejo University VC	25–16	25–21	25–18			75–55

== Final standing ==
Rank	Team
1st place, gold medalist(s)	Wing 46 Toyota-Phitsanulok
2nd place, silver medalist(s)	Phetchaburi VC
3rd place, bronze medalist(s)	IAM CMU VC
4	Sanpawut–Saraburi–Thai-Denmark VC
5	Maejo University VC
6	3 Orchids–Makkasan VC
7	MTB. 11–Chainat VC

Qualified for the 2014–15 Volleyball Thailand League
