= Turkish Futsal League =

- Founded: 2008; 18 years ago
- Country: Turkey
- Confederation: UEFA (Europe)
- Number of clubs: 8
- Level on pyramid: 1
- International cup: UEFA Futsal Champions League
- Current champions: Vangölü Sportif Faaliyetler SK (1st title) (2024–25)
- Most championships: İstanbul Universitesi SBK
- Broadcaster(s): Turkish Football Federation YouTube channel
- Website: www.tff.org
- Current: 2025–26

The Turkish Futsal League formerly known as TFF Efes Pilsen Futsal Ligi is the premier futsal competition in Turkey organized by the Turkish Football Federation (TFF).

The Futsal Ligi is contested by eight teams. The top six of last season accompanied by two teams entering the league after preliminary rounds. The league stage is followed by a Final Four. The games are played under FIFA rules.

== Champions ==
Season	1st place, gold medalist(s)	2nd place, silver medalist(s)	3rd place, bronze medalist(s)	4.
2008–09	Gazi Üniversitesi	Muğla Sıtkı Koçman Üniversitesi	İstanbul Üniversitesi SBK	Ondokuz Mayıs Üniversitesi
2009–10	İstanbul Üniversitesi SBK	Çamlaraltı Koleji Ege Elitspor	Orta Doğu Teknik Üniversitesi	Atatürk Üniversitesi
2010–11	İstanbul Üniversitesi SBK	Çamlaraltı Koleji Ege Elitspor	Seyhan Belediyespor	Kayseri Atatürk Lisesi
2011-12	Postponed due to events in the championship match between İstanbul Üniviversitesi SBK - Çamlaraltı Koleji Ege Elitspor		TÜFAD	Elazığ Gençlik SK
2012-13	Fırat Üniversitesi (1st title)	Polis Akademisi	Nişanca Kalespor	Gençlerbirliği
2013-14	İstanbul Üniversitesi SBK	Poyracıkspor	Osmanlıspor	Yeni Malatyaspor
2014-15	İstanbul Üniversitesi SBK	Osmanlıspor	Seyhan Belediyespor	Nişanca Kalespor
2015-16	İstanbul Üniversitesi SBK (5th title)	Osmanlıspor	Seyhan Belediyespor	Karasu Yalıspor
2016-17	Arnavutköy Belediyespor (1st title)	Osmanlıspor	Hankendi Belediyespor	Palandöken Belediyespor
2017-18	Osmanlıspor (1st title)	Arnavutköy Belediyespor	Seyhan Belediyespor	Alipaşa SK
2018-19	Gazi Üniversitesi (2nd title)	Alibeyköyspor	Siirt Üniversitesi	Seyhan Belediyespor
2019-20	Cancelled due to COVID-19 pandemic			
2020-21	Cancelled due to COVID-19 pandemic			
2021-22	Şişlispor	-	-	-
2022-23	Şişlispor	Bingöl GSK	Alipaşa SK	Sakarya Kurudere SK
2023-24	Şişlispor (3rd title)	Bingöl GSK	Vangölü Sportif Faaliyetler SK	Alagöz Holding Iğdır FK
2024-25	Vangölü Sportif Faaliyetler SK (1st title)	Osmanlı 41 SK	Karasu 1933 SK	Alipaşa SK

== Clubs ==
The following 8 clubs are competing in the Turkish Futsal League 2025-26 season.

Club	Location
Alipaşa SK	Diyarbakır
Anadolubeyi SK	Ankara
Battalgazi Belediyesi SK	Malatya
Karasu 1933 SK	Sakarya
Kocaeli Üniversitesi	Kocaeli
Osmanlı 41 SK	Kocaeli
Seyrantepe İdman Yurdu	Diyarbakır
Vangölü Sportif Faaliyetler	Van
