= Croatian Federation of American Football =

Governing body of American football in Croatia

- Formation: 2008
- Type: American football
- Headquarters: Zagreb, Croatia
- Official language: Croatian
- Website: hsan.hr/

The Croatian Federation of American Football (Croatian: Hrvatski savez američkog nogometa) is the governing body of the sport of American football in Croatia. Formed in 2008, the federation oversees the Croatian League, the Croatian Bowl and the national selections.

== History ==
The Croatian American Football Association was formed in 2008. From July 2014, Croatia is a member of the International Federation of American Football (IFAF). In Croatia, there are currently nine teams competing in the national championship. The championship was first held in 2010 and since 2009, There are flag leagues.

Since 2015, the Croatian Federation of American Football is a provisional member of the Croatian Olympic Committee.

== Hrvatska liga ==
The HSAN organizes the Hrvatska liga competition. The Croatian football league has been Played since 2008.
