= Norwegian Volleyball League =

Volleyball competition in Norway

- Current season, competition or edition: 2026–27 Norwegian Volleyball League
- Sport: Volleyball
- Founded: 1973
- First season: 1973
- Administrator: NVBF
- No. of teams: 9
- Country: Norway
- Continent: Europe
- Level on pyramid: 1
- Relegation to: 2nd League
- Domestic cups: Norway Cup; Norway Super Cup
- International cups: CEV Champions League; CEV Cup; CEV Challenge Cup
- Website: volleyball.no

The Norwegian Men's Volleyball League is a men's volleyball competition which has existed since 1973. It is organized by the Norwegian Volleyball Federation (Norges Volleyballforbund, NVBF).

== Winners list ==
- 1973 : Oslo SI
- 1974 : Oslo SI
- 1975 : Oslo SI
- 1976 : Bergen SI
- 1977 : Oslo SI
- 1978 : Oslo SI
- 1979 : Bergen SI
- 1980 : Bergen SI
- 1981 : KFUM Oslo
- 1982 : BK Tromsø
- 1983 : BK Tromsø
- 1984 : Hellerasten VBK
- 1985 : BK Tromsø
- 1986 : Hellerasten VBK
- 1987 : Ulriken VBK
- 1988 : Ulriken VBK
- 1989 : Ulriken VBK
- 1990 : Randaberg IL
- 1991 : Skien VBK
- 1992 : Kolbotn IL
- 1993 : Skien VBK
- 1994 : Skien VBK
- 1995 : Båtsfjord SK
- 1996 : Båtsfjord SK
- 1997 : Nyborg VBK
- 1998 : Askim VBK
- 1999 : Mosjøen VBK
- 2000 : Nyborg VBK
- 2001 : Kristiansund VBK
- 2002 : Nyborg VBK
- 2003 : Kristiansund VBK
- 2004 : BK Tromsø
- 2005 : Nyborg VBK
- 2006 : Kristiansund VBK
- 2007 : BK Tromsø
- 2008 : Førde VBK
- 2009 : Nyborg VBK
- 2010 : Nyborg VBK
- 2011 : Nyborg VBK
- 2012 : Nyborg VBK
- 2013 : Førde VBK
- 2014 : Nyborg VBK
- 2015 : Nyborg VBK
- 2016 : Førde VBK
- 2017 : Førde VBK
- 2018 : Nyborg VBK
- 2019 : Førde VBK
- 2022 : IL Koll
- 2023 : TIF Viking
- 2024 : IL Koll
- 2025 : TIF Viking
- 2026 : BK Tromsø
