= Israeli Men's Volleyball League =

- Current season, competition or edition: 2023–24 Israeli Men's Volleyball League
- Sport: Volleyball
- Founded: 1956
- First season: 1956
- Administrator: IVA
- No. of teams: 10
- Country: Israel
- Confederation: CEV
- Level on pyramid: 1
- Relegation to: 2nd League
- Domestic cups: Israeli Cup; Israeli Super Cup
- International cups: CEV Champions League; CEV Cup; CEV Challenge Cup
- Website: http://www.iva.org.il/

The Israeli Men's Volleyball First League is the top-tier Israeli men's volleyball competition organized by the Israeli Volleyball Association (איגוד הכדורעף בישראל, IVA), it was established in 1956.

== History ==
The 2018/19 Edition of the Israeli Volleyball Premier League was attended by 8 teams: "Hapoel (Matte Asher), Hapoel (Kfar Saba), Maccabi (Tel Aviv), Hapoel Menashe-Hadera (Emek-Hefer), Maccabi (Hod-Ha Sharon), Ilabon, Elitzur-Carmel (Kohav-Yair-Tzur-Igal), KK (Tel Aviv). The championship title for the 2nd time in a row was won by the team Hapoel (Mate-Ascher), which won the final series beating Hapoel (Kfar Saba) 3-1 (3:1, 1:3, 3:0, 3:1). The 3rd place went to Maccabi (Tel Aviv).

== Winners list ==
Years	Champions
1956	Hapoel Beit Zera/Afikim
1957	Hapoel Ein Shemer
1958	Hapoel Sarid
1959	Hapoel Ein Shemer
1960	Hapoel Ein Shemer
1961	Hapoel Ein Shemer
1962	Hapoel Negba
1963	Hapoel Hampil
1964	Hapoel Hampil
1965	Hapoel Hampil
1966	Hapoel Hampil
1967	Hapoel Hampil
1968	Hapoel Hampil
1969	Hapoel Hampil
1970	Hapoel Hampil
1971	Hapoel Hampil
1972	Ein Hamifratz / Kfar Masaryk
1973	Ein Hamifratz / Kfar Masaryk
1974	Ein Hamifratz / Kfar Masaryk
1975	Ein Hamifratz / Kfar Masaryk
1976	Maccabi Tel Aviv
1977	Hapoel Kiryat Ata
1978	Hapoel Kiryat Ata

Years	Champions
1979	Hapoel HaOgen
1980	Hapoel Hampil
1981	Hapoel Hampil
1982	Maccabi Tel Aviv
1983	Hapoel Hampil
1984	Hapoel Hampil
1985	Hapoel Hampil
1986	Hapoel Bat Yam
1987	Hapoel Mateh Asher
1988	Hapoel Mateh Asher
1989	Hapoel Bat Yam
1990	Maccabi Tel Aviv
1991	Maccabi Tel Aviv
1992	Hapoel Mateh Asher
1993	Hapoel Bat Yam
1994	Hapoel Mateh Asher
1995	Hapoel Ha'amakim
1996	Hapoel Ha'amakim
1997	Maccabi Tel Aviv
1998	Hapoel Mateh Asher
1999	Hapoel Mateh Asher
2000	Hapoel Kfar Saba
2001	Hapoel Mateh Asher

Years	Champions
2002	Hapoel Mateh Asher
2003	Hapoel Mateh Asher
2004	Hapoel Ironi Kiryat Ata
2005	Hapoel Ironi Kiryat Ata
2006	Hapoel Ironi Kiryat Ata
2007	Maccabi Hod Hasharon
2008	Maccabi Tel Aviv
2009	Maccabi Tel Aviv
2010	Maccabi Tel Aviv
2011	Maccabi Tel Aviv
2012	Maccabi Tel Aviv
2013	Hapoel Mateh Asher
2014	Hapoel Mateh Asher
2015	Hapoel Mateh Asher
2016	Hapoel Mateh Asher
2017	Maccabi Tel Aviv
2018	Hapoel Mateh Asher
2019	Hapoel Mateh Asher
2020	Hapoel Mateh Asher
2021	Maccabi Tel Aviv
2022	Maccabi Tel Aviv
2023	Maccabi Tel Aviv
2024	Maccabi Tel Aviv
2025	Maccabi Tel Aviv
2026	

Clubs	Titles
Hapoel Mateh Asher	16
Maccabi Tel Aviv	16
Hapoel Hampil	14
Ironi Kiryat Ata	5
Ein Hamifratz / Kfar Masaryk	4
Hapoel Ein Shemer	4
Hapoel Bat Yam	3
Hapoel Ha'amakim	2
Hapoel Beit Zera	1
Hapoel HaOgen	1
Hapoel Negba	1
Hapoel Sarid	1
Hapoel Kfar Saba	1
Maccabi Hod Hasharon	1
