= Men's Volleyball Pro Challenge =

- Current season, competition or edition: 2017 Men's Volleyball Pro Challenge
- Sport: Volleyball
- No. of teams: 7
- Country: Thailand
- Continent: AVC (Asia)
- Most recent champion: Khon Kaen Municipality
- Website: Thailand Volleyball Association

Men's Volleyball Pro Challenge (Thai: วอลเลย์บอลชายโปรชาเลนจ์) is the second-tier professional league in Thai domestic volleyball tournament. The top two are promoted to Men's Volleyball Thailand League at the end of the season. Seasons run from July to September, with teams playing six games each. Most games are played on Saturdays and Sundays, with a few games played on weekdays.

== Current clubs ==
- Cosmo Chiang Rai VC
- Khon Kaen Municipality VC
- Nakhonnont VC
- RSU VC
- Sisaket
- Sponxel–MS VC
- Strong Wings–Chiang Mai

== Results summary ==
Season	Champions	Runners-up	Third place
2011	Nakhonsawan	Phetchaburi	Maejo Thai-Denmark
2012	Maejo Thai-Denmark	Krungkao	Sengleetai–Udonthani
2013	Kasetsart	Pibulsongkram Phitsanulok	Hariphunchai–Strong Wing
2014	Wing 46 Toyota-Phitsanulok	Phetchaburi	I AM CMU
2015	Ratchaburi	Rajamangala Thanyaburi	Sensei-Chiang Mai-Strong Wings
2016	Not held		
2017	Khon Kaen Municipality	Cosmo Chiang Rai	Nakhonnont

=== Titles by team ===
Club	Titles	Years won
Khon Kaen Municipality	1	2017
Ratchaburi	1	2015
Wing 46 Toyota-Phitsanulok	1	2014
Kasetsart	1	2013
Maejo Thai-Denmark	1	2012
Nakhonsawan	1	2011

== See also ==
- Men's Volleyball Thailand League
- Volleyball Thai-Denmark Super League
