= Honkbal Rookie League =

Dutch professional baseball league

- Sport: Baseball
- No. of teams: 8
- Country: Netherlands
- Most recent champion: DOOR Tridents

The Honkbal Rookie League (Dutch for Baseball Rookie League) is a professional baseball league in the Netherlands for rookies from the teams in the Honkbal Hoofdklasse. It is an eight-team league that plays a 42-game schedule. The season runs from April to September and is not followed by a promotion and relegation system.

== 2011 season ==
The 2011 Honkbal Rookie League season began Friday, April 8.

Teams	W	L	Pct.	GB
Mr. Cocker HCAW	12	6	.658	—
De Kroon Kinheim	12	7	.632	¾
Amsterdam Pirates	12	7	.632	¾
DOOR Tridents	12	7	.632	¾
ADO Den Haag	8	10	.447	4
UVV Utrecht	8	11	.421	4¾
Omron Pioniers	6	13	.316	6¾
Sparta/Feyenoord	4	13	.263	7¼

== See also ==
- Baseball in the Netherlands
- Baseball awards § Netherlands
- Baseball awards § Europe
