= Eastern European Super League =

American football league in Europe

- Current season, competition or edition: 2022 EESL season
- Formerly: Russian Championship
- Sport: American football
- Founded: 2019
- First season: 2019
- No. of teams: 41
- Country: Russia; Belarus
- Most recent champion: Moscow Spartans
- Most titles: Moscow Spartans (5 titles)
- Broadcaster: YouTube
- Website: http://eesl.pro/

The Eastern European Super League (Russian: Восточно-европейская Суперлига, romanized: Vostochno-Yevropeiskaya Superliga) is an international American football tournament that brings together the best clubs from the Russian Federation and the Republic of Belarus. The tournament originated in 2019, when the best teams of Russia, Belarus and Ukraine decided to found a competition called the East European Super League. The list of prospective participants included three Russian teams - Moscow Spartans and St. Petersburg Griffins and Northern Legion, two Ukrainian teams - Kyiv Capitals and Patriots, as well as two Belarusian teams - Minsk Zubrs and Litvins.

Unfortunately, by the start of the season in the spring of 2019, three Russian teams and Belarusian Litvins had remained in the tournament bracket. The first champion of the Eastern European Super League were the Moscow Spartans, who defeated the Northern Legion in the final.

Since 2020, almost all competitions in the Russian Federation have been held under the auspices of the East European Super League:

- Super League - Russian American Football Championship - the number of its participants has grown up to 6 (but later reduced back to 5).
- The Open League of the Black Earth Region changed its name to National Major League - Russian Football Cup - the number of participants increased up to 19.
- Volga Bowl changed its name to First League - Russian American Football Championship in the 9x9 format - the number of participants has grown up to 16 teams.

== Format ==
The 2019 season was a round robin, the teams spent 6 games each in the regular season and 2 games in the playoffs (semi-final, match for third place and final). The tournament was held from April to July. The winner of the first ever Super League was the Spartans team from Moscow., who won the league championship in the first time in its history.

Super League is a round robin tournament in which teams meet each other once.

National Major League - group stage + playoffs. Teams are divided into 6 divisions. All divisions, except for the Far East division, have in mind a circular meeting system.

League One - group stage + playoffs. Teams are divided into 4 divisions.

== 2019 Season Clubs ==
- Minsk Litwins
- Moscow Spartans
- Saint Petersburg Northern Legion
- Saint Petersburg Griffins

== 2020 Season Clubs ==
=== Super League ===
- Minsk Litwins
- Moscow Dragons
- Moscow Patriots
- Moscow Spartans
- Perm Steel Tigers
- Saint Petersburg Northern Legion

=== National Major League ===
Center Division	Far East Division	North Division	South Division	Ural Division	West Division
Moscow United	Komsomolsk On Amur Black Grizzly	Moscow Spartak(American football)	Krasnodar Bisons	Chelyabinsk Scouts	Bryansk Robbers
Tula Tarantula	Khabarovsk Legio-27	Petrozavodsk Gunners	Sevastopol Titans	Samara Strombringers	Obninsk Cyborgs
Voronezh Mighty Ducks	Vladivostok Wild Pandas	Podolsk Vityaz(American football)		Yekaterinburg Ural Lightnings	Vitebsk Healers
	Yakutsk Boturs	Saint Petersburg MChS			

=== First League ===
Center-North Division	Kama Division	South Division	Volga Division
Arkhangelsk Woodcutters	Izhevsk Dinamo	Novorossiysk Admirals	Kazan Motors
Moscow Phoenix	Naberezhnye Chelny Bulldogs	Volgograd Stalingrad	Nizhny Novgorod Raiders-52
Moscow Spartans-2	Tumen Black Sables	Volzhsky Kites	Samara Bears
Yaroslavl Rebels	Ufa Wolfhounds		Team Penza and Saratov
Vologda Vikings			

== Finals ==
Date	Winner	Result	Finalist	Stadium	City	Ref.
July 13, 2019	Moscow Spartans	42–16	Northern Legion Saint Petersburg	Tsarskoye Selo Stadium	Pushkin, Leningrad Oblast, Russia	
October 31, 2020	Moscow Spartans	36–6	Steel Tigers Perm	Chayka Stadium	Korolyov, Moscow Oblast, Russia	
August 1, 2021	Moscow Spartans	13–3	Moscow Patriots	Vympel Stadium	Korolyov, Moscow Oblast, Russia	
October 2, 2022	Spartak Moscow	20–7	Griffins	Zorky Stadium	Krasnogorsk, Moscow Oblast, Russia	
July 16, 2023	Moscow Spartans	34–3	Northern Legion	Central'nyj Stadion Odintsovo	Odintsovo, Moscow Oblast, Russia	
August 31, 2024	Moscow Spartans	34–31	Spartak Moscow	Zorky Stadium	Krasnogorsk, Moscow Oblast, Russia	

== Winners ==
Club	Wins	Finals	Winning years	Final Games Appearances
Moscow Spartans	5	0	2019, 2020, 2021, 2023, 2024	
Spartak Moscow	1	1	2022	2024
Northern Legion Saint Petersburg	0	2		2019, 2023
Griffins	0	1		2022
Moscow Patriots	0	1		2021
Steel Tigers Perm	0	1		2020
