= Uttar Pradesh Kabaddi League =

Sports league in India

- Country: India
- Administrator: Sambhav Jain. Rachit Sharma & Aman Saxena
- First tournament: 2024
- Current champions: Lucknow Lions

Uttar Pradesh Kabaddi League(UPKL) is an Indian professional Kabaddi League. It was founded by Sambhav Jain, Rachit Sharma & Aman Saxena in 2024. The first season is organised with the cooperation of UP Kabaddi Association.

== Seasons 1 ==
The first UPKL mega auction was held on 10 June 2024 at Sarovar Hotel, Noida. The first season of league started on July 11 till July 25 2024 in Noida, Uttar Pradesh. Lucknow Lion placed the highest bid, paying 3.10 lakhs for Arjun Deswal, while Yamuna Yodha paid 3.10 lakhs for Vinay. Abhijeet Malik was acquired by Sangam Challengers for 2.60 lakhs, Amit Nagar was purchased by Noida Ninja for 1.45 lakhs, and Ashu Singh was purchased by Avadh Ramdoot for 1.5 lakhs. The Lucknow Lions defeated the Sangam Challengers 59-33 to win the championship.

== Teams ==
- Awadh Ramdoot
- Brij Stars
- Ganga Kings of Mirzapur
- JD Noida Ninjas
- Kashi Kings
- Lucknow Lions
- Yamuna Yodhas
- Sangam Challengers
