= Swiss Volleyball League =

Sports event

Swiss Ligue Nationale A Volleyball
- Current season, competition or edition: 2026–27 Swiss Ligue Nationale A Volleyball
- Sport: Volleyball
- Founded: 1957
- First season: 1957
- Administrator: Swiss Volley
- No. of teams: 7
- Country: Switzerland
- Continent: Europe
- Level on pyramid: 1 Level
- Relegation to: 2nd League
- Domestic cups: Swiss Cup; Swiss Super Cup
- International cups: CEV Champions League; CEV Cup; CEV Challenge Cup
- Website: volleyball.ch

The Swiss Men's Volleyball Ligue 1 is a men's volleyball competition organized by the Swiss Volleyball Federation (Swiss Volley), it was created in 1957.

== History ==
In the 2020/21 championship, 8 teams played in the League A: Lindaren ( Amriswil ), Chenois Geneva ( Geneva ), Schönenwerd, Lausanne, Nefels, Yona, Basel, Lindaren ( Lucerne ). Champion title was won by "Chenoit Geneva", who won in the final series beating up "Lindaren" (Amriswil) 3-1 (3: 2, 0: 3, 3: 1, 3: 0). 3rd place was taken by "Schönenwerd".

== Winners List ==
- 1957 : EOS Lausanne
- 1958 : VC Universität Berne
- 1959 : EOS Lausanne
- 1960 : EOS Lausanne
- 1961 : Servette VB
- 1962 : Servette VB
- 1963 : Servette VB
- 1964 : Servette VB
- 1965 : Servette VB
- 1966 : Servette VB
- 1967 : Servette VB
- 1968 : Star-Onex VBC
- 1969 : Star Onex VBC
- 1970 : Spada Academica
- 1971 : Spada Academica
- 1972 : Spada Academica
- 1973 : Spada Academica
- 1974 : Servette Star-Onex VBC
- 1975 : VBC Bienne
- 1976 : VBC Bienne
- 1977 : VBC Voléro Zurich
- 1978 : VBC Bienne
- 1979 : VBC Bienne
- 1980 : VBC Bienne
- 1981 : Servette Star-Onex VBC
- 1982 : Servette Star-Onex VBC
- 1983 : Lausanne UC
- 1984 : CS Chênois
- 1985 : Leysin VBC
- 1986 : Leysin VBC
- 1987 : Leysin VBC
- 1988 : Leysin VBC
- 1989 : Leysin VBC
- 1990 : Leysin VBC
- 1991 : Lausanne UC
- 1992 : Lausanne UC
- 1993 : Lausanne UC
- 1994 : Lausanne UC
- 1995 : Lausanne UC
- 1996 : CS Chênois
- 1997 : CS Chênois
- 1998 : Volley Näfels
- 1999 : Volley Näfels
- 2000 : Volley Näfels
- 2001 : Volley Näfels
- 2002 : CS Chênois
- 2003 : Volley Näfels
- 2004 : Volley Näfels
- 2005 : Volley Näfels
- 2006 : CS Chênois
- 2007 : Volley Näfels
- 2008 : Lausanne UC
- 2009 : TV Amriswil
- 2010 : TV Amriswil
- 2011 : Volley Näfels
- 2012 : CS Chênois
- 2013 : Pallavolo Lugano
- 2014 : Pallavolo Lugano
- 2015 : Pallavolo Lugano
- 2016 : TV Amriswil
- 2017 : TV Amriswil
- 2018 : Lausanne UC
- 2019 : Lausanne UC
- 2021 : CS Chênois
- 2022 : TV Amriswil
- 2023 : TV Schönenwerd
- 2024 : TV Schönenwerd
- 2025 : TV Amriswil
- 2026 : TV Amriswil
