= Russia national American football team =

- Russia Россия

Home

Away
Association	Federation of American Football in Russia (FAFR)
Region	Europe (IFAF Europe)
Founded	1992
- IFAF affiliation
Colors	Red and white
Head coach	Dmitry Maksimov
- General manager

The Russia national American football team (Russian: Сборная России по американскому футболу) is the official American football senior national team of Russia. In 1989, the Moscow Bears team was formed and represented the Soviet Union in the international tournament. During the 1991-1992 international tour the Soviet Union collapsed and season was suspended in the turmoils of the dissolution of the USSR. The team was reformed later in 1992 to finish the season. After 1992 season, the Bears name would no longer represent the national team and the team joined the newly reorganized Russian American Football Championship.

== History ==
=== The birth of American football in the Soviet Union ===
American football first appeared in the Soviet Union in the summer of 1989, when two Oklahoman high school football teams ("Stars" and "Boomers") played three exhibition games in Moscow, Leningrad, and Tallinn, Estonian SSR. In 1989, the Moscow Bears team was formed and represented the Soviet Union in the international tournament. The first official game of the USSR national team was a loss to the Germany national team on 17 September of the same year, 77–6.

On 10 November, the Union of American football in USSR was formed, but in 1990, due to differences in the leadership, the Union established an independent association. In 1991, all teams joined the association. In late January 1991, the USSR national team debuted in the European Championships qualifying tournament in a game against the Netherlands, losing to the Orange 30–7.

=== Russia ===
Following the collapse of the Soviet regime in 1991, the Association of American football transformed into the Eurasian League. Teams from the former Soviet Union entered. In 1992, the Moscow Bears played in North America against the University of Central Florida and the UCF Knights football team but lost 43-6. In 1994, the first school of American football sport was opened. In 1996 the Moscow Federation of American Football was created.

In 1998, the Russian national team debuted in the European Junior Championships in Düsseldorf, Germany. Russia took a fourth place. In 2000, Russia was the runner-up of Europe, losing in the finals to the Germans. In 2002, they won the gold medal. In 1999, Russia debuted in the European League Cup. The Moscow Bears reached the quarterfinals, second to the Helsinki Roosters. In 2003, the adult team won the European Championship in group "C" and was promoted to group "B". In 2004, the team took third place in the European Championship in the "B" group. In 2012, they did not appear. Due to the long absence, the team moved to group "C".

In response to the Russian invasion of Ukraine, Russia was suspended from sport competitions by IFAF Europe as the Italy national American football team refused to play against Russia in October 2022 in a qualifier for the 2023 IFAF European Championships.
