= Ukrainian Beach Soccer Premier League =

- Founded: 2002
- Country: Ukraine
- Confederation: UEFA
- Number of clubs: 8
- Level on pyramid: 1
- Current champions: VIT Kyiv
- Most championships: Euroformat Kyiv (5 titles)

The Ukrainian Beach Soccer Premier League (Ukrainian: Чемпіонат України з пляжного футболу серед клубів вищої ліги) is the top men's league of Ukrainian beach soccer. It was founded in 2002. It is organized by the Football Federation of Ukraine (FFU). Between leagues at the end of each season, the teams exchanged - the worst drop in the lower-ranking division, their places are taken by the best team of the lower leagues.

== Seasons ==
Year	Gold	Silver	Bronze
2002	Lotto Kyiv	Maindsher Kyiv	Dynamo Zaporizhia
2003	Maindsher Kyiv	Lada Kremenchuk	HVEM Sevastopol
2004	Nova Era Kyiv	Hloriya Odesa	Maindsher Kyiv
2005	Nova Era Kyiv	Maindsher Kyiv	Katran Zaporizhia
2006	Maindsher Kyiv	Pleso Kyiv	Hloriya Odesa
2007	Nova Era Kyiv	Marrion Odesa	Pleso Kyiv
2008	BRR Kyiv	Maindsher Kyiv	Metrobud Kyiv
2009	Maindsher Kyiv	BRR Kyiv	Hloriya Odesa
2010	Vybir Dnipropetrovsk	Maindsher Kyiv	Dynamo-Hild Kyiv
2011	Euroformat Kyiv	Maindsher Kyiv	Metrobud Kyiv
2012	Maindsher Kyiv	Griffin Kyiv	Euroformat Kyiv
2013	Artur Music Kyiv	Griffin Kyiv	Vybir Dnipropetrovsk
2014	Vybir Dnipropetrovsk	Griffin Kyiv	FarsiFarm Kyiv
2015	HIT Kyiv	FarsiFarm Kyiv	Euroformat Kyiv
2016	Griffin Kyiv	Artur Music Kyiv	Vybir Dnipro
2017	Choice Dnipropetrovsk	Griffin Kyiv	Euroformat Kyiv
2018	Euroformat Kyiv	VIT Kyiv	Alternative Kyiv
2019	Alternative Kyiv	Kyivmiskbud Kyiv	VIT Kyiv
2020	VIT Kyiv	Alternative Kyiv	Artur Music Kyiv

== Performance by club ==
Team	Winners	Runners-up	Third place
Euroformat Kyiv (Nova Era Kyiv)	5	0	3
Maindsher Kyiv	4	5	1
Vybir Dnipro	3	0	2
Griffin Kyiv	1	4	0
Artur Music Kyiv	1	1	1
Alternative Kyiv	1	1	1
VIT Kyiv	1	1	1
BRR Kyiv	1	1	0
Lotto Kyiv	1	0	0
HIT Kyiv	1	0	0
Hloriya Odesa	0	1	2
FarsiFarm Kyiv	0	1	1
Pleso Kyiv	0	1	1
Lada Kremenchuk	0	1	0
Marrion Odesa	0	1	0
Kyivmiskbud Kyiv	0	1	0
Metrobud Kyiv	0	0	2
Dynamo Zaporizhia	0	0	1
HVEM Sevastopol	0	0	1
Katran Zaporizhia	0	0	1
Dynamo-Hild Kyiv	0	0	1
Total	19	19	19

== See also ==
- FIFA Beach Soccer World Cup
- Euro Beach Soccer League
- Euro Beach Soccer Cup
