= Danish Women's Volleyball League =

- Current season, competition or edition: 2019–20 Women's Danish Volleyball League
- Sport: Volleyball
- Founded: 1962
- First season: 1962
- Administrator: DVF
- No. of teams: 8 (2019–20)
- Country: Denmark
- Continent: Europe
- Most recent champion: Holte IF (17th title)
- Most titles: Holte IF (17 titles)
- Level on pyramid: 1
- Relegation to: 2nd League
- Domestic cups: Danish Cup; Danish Super Cup
- International cups: CEV Champions League; CEV Cup; CEV Challenge Cup
- Website: http://www.volleyball.dk/

The Denmark Women's Volleyball League is a Women's volleyball competition organized by the Dansk Volleyball Forbund (DVF), it was created in 1962.

== History ==
The Danish Women's Volleyball League is the Women's topflight League in Danish volleyball Organized since 1962. The competition is dominated Largely by Holte IF having won a total of 18 titles seven of them consecutively between (1993–1999), while Helsingør KFUM from Helsingør comes second with nine consecutive titles won between (1979—1987). 2021/22 League was played in a regular season mode then teams are qualified for a title deciding Playoffs.

== List of Champions ==
Years	(gold) Gold	(silver) Silver	(bronze) Bronze
1963	Vognmandsmarken	Hvidovre VK	ASV Århus
1964	Vognmandsmarken	ASV Århus	Nyborg VK/TV
1965	Vognmandsmarken	USG København	Åbyhøj IF
1966	Vognmandsmarken	Ryesgade VK	Åbyhøj IF
1967	Vognmandsmarken	USG København	Nyborg VK
1968	USG København	Vognmandsmarken	Nyborg VK
1969	VKV Gladsaxe	USG København	Nyborg VK
1970	ASV Århus	VKV Gladsaxe	USG Kbh.
1971	Bokma Odense	VKV Gladsaxe	ASV Århus
1972	Bokma Odense	ASV Århus	VKV Gladsaxe
1973	Bokma Odense	ASV Århus	VKV Gladsaxe
1974	VKV Gladsaxe	Bokma Odense	VK Shima
1975	Bokma Odense	ASV Århus	VKV Gladsaxe
1976	ASV Århus	VKV Gladsaxe	DHV Odense
1977	VKV Gladsaxe	ASV Århus	DHV Odense
1978	ASV Århus	DHV Odense	VKV Gladsaxe
1979	Helsingør KFUM	ASV Århus	VKV Gladsaxe
1980	Helsingør KFUM	Skødstrup SF	VKV Gladsaxe
1981	Helsingør KFUM	Skødstrup SF	BVC Esbjerg
1982	Helsingør KFUM	ASV Århus	Skødstrup SF
1983	Helsingør KFUM	Skødstrup SF	ASV Århus
1984	Helsingør KFUM	VKV Gladsaxe	ASV Århus
1985	Helsingør KFUM	VKV Gladsaxe	ASV Århus
1986	Helsingør KFUM	Brøndby VK	VKV Gladsaxe
1987	Helsingør KFUM	ASV Århus	VKV Gladsaxe
1988	Holte IF	ASV Århus	VKV Gladsaxe
1989	Holte IF	Helsingør KFUM	ASV Århus
1990	Holte IF	Fortuna Odense Volley	VK Næstved
1991	ASV Århus	Holte IF	Fortuna Odense Volley
1992	Fortuna Odense Volley	Holte IF	ASV Århus
1993	Holte IF	Fortuna Odense Volley	ASV Århus
1994	Holte IF	Fortuna Odense Volley	DHV Odense
1995	Holte IF	Fortuna Odense Volley	DHV Odense
1996	Holte IF	TV 55	DHV Odense
1997	Holte IF	DHV Odense	Fortuna Odense Volley
1998	Holte IF	DHV Odense	IK Skovbakken
1999	Holte IF	DHV Odense	Fortuna Odense Volley
2000	DHV Odense	Holte IF	Gentofte Volley
2001	DHV Odense	Holte IF	Gentofte Volley
2002	DHV Odense	Holte IF	HIK Aalborg
2003	Holte IF	DHV Odense	HIK Aalborg
2004	DHV Odense	Holte IF	Aalborg HIK
2005	Lyngby Volley	Holte IF	Fortuna Odense Volley
2006	Fortuna Odense Volley	Holte IF	Lyngby Volley
2007	Fortuna Odense Volley	Lyngby Volley	Holte IF
2008	Fortuna Odense Volley	Holte IF	Brøndby VK
2009	Holte IF	Fortuna Odense Volley	Skovbakken Volley
2010	Fortuna Odense Volley	Holte IF	Brøndby VK
2011	Brøndby VK	Holte IF	Fortuna Odense Volley
2012	Holte IF	Brøndby VK	Fortuna Odense Volley
2013	Holte IF	Brøndby VK	Fortuna Odense Volley
2014	Brøndby VK	Holte IF	Fortuna Odense Volley
2015	Brøndby VK	Lyngby Volley	Holte IF
2016	Brøndby VK	Holte IF	Amager VK
2017	Holte IF	Brøndby VK	Amager VK
2018	Brøndby VK	Holte IF	Amager VK
2019	Holte IF	Brøndby VK	Elite Volley Aarhus
2020	Holte IF	Brøndby VK	Gentofte Volley

== Table by Club ==
rk.	Club	Titles	City	Years Won
1	Holte IF	18	Holte	(1988—1990), (1993—1999), 2003, 2009, (2012—2013), 2017, (2019—2021)
2	Helsingør KFUM	9	Helsingør	(1979—1987)
3	Vognmandsmarken	5	Copenhague	(1963—1967)
=	Fortuna Odense	5	Odense	1992, (2006—2008), 2010
=	Brøndby VK	5	Brøndby	2011, (2014—2016), 2018
6	ASV Århus	4	Aarhus	1970, 1976, 1978, 1991
=	Bokma Odense	4	Odense	(1971—1973), 1975
=	DHV Odense	4	Odense	(2000—2002), 2004
9	VKV Gladsaxe	3	Gladsaxe	1969, 1974, 1977
10	USG København	1	Copenhague	1968
=	Lyngby Volley	1	Lyngby-Taarbæk	2005
