= Australian Women's Volleyball League =

- Current season, competition or edition: 2019–20 Australian Women's Volleyball League
- Sport: Volleyball
- Founded: 1998
- First season: 1998
- Administrator: AVF
- No. of teams: 8 (2019–20)
- Country: Australia
- Continent: Oceania
- International cup: AVC Club Volleyball Championship
- Website: http://www.volleyballaustralia.org.au/

The Australian Volleyball League (AVL) for women is the largest national volleyball competition organized by the Australian Volleyball Federation (AVF) in women's Level and was established in 1998.

== History ==
In the 2019/20 AVL season, 8 teams has participated in the regular season of which 4 has qualified to the final four round : QLD Pirates, Canberra Heat, Melbourne Vipers and Adelaide Storm. The Championship title was won by Melbourne Vipers beating out QLD Pirates in a Single Decisive match with 3 – 2 score.

== Winners list ==
Years	Champions	Runners-up	Third place
1998	Australian Institute of Sport	Adelaide Mt Lofty	Melbourne Falcons
1999	CIT Canberra Cougars	Melbourne Falcons	Cenovis Adelaide
2000	Canberra Cougars	Queensland Pirates	
2001	Melbourne Falcons	University of Technology Sydney	Mount Lofty
2002	Mt Lofty Centacare Rangers	Melbourne Falcons	University of Technology Sydney
2003	Western Australia	Australian Institute of Sport	University of Technology Sydney
2004	Australian Institute of Sport	Sydney University Lions	Melbourne Falcons
2005	USC Adelaide Lion	Canberra Heat	Melbourne Falcons
2006	Mt Lofty Rangers	Kumho Sydney Lions	University of Technology Sydney
2007	Melbourne Monash University Blues	UTSSU	Centacare Adelaide Rangers
2008	UTSSU	University Blues	Queensland Pirates
2009	Western Australian Pearls	University Blues	Volleyball SA
2010	Western Australian Pearls	University Blues	UTSSU
2011	Western Australian Pearls	South Australia	University Blues
2012	Queensland Pirates	Victorian Volleyball Academy	WA Pearls
2013	University Blues	WA Pearls	Victorian Volleyball Academy
2014	University Blues	UTSSU	Queensland Pirates
2015	University Blues	UTSSU	Victorian Volleyball Academy
2016	University Blues	Queensland Pirates	Sydney Amazons
2017	University Blues	WA Pearls	Queensland Pirates
2018	University Blues	Volleyball Australia Centre of Excellence	Canberra Heat
2019	Melbourne Vipers	Queensland Pirates	Adelaide Storm
2022	Queensland Pirates	WA Steel	Melbourne Vipers
