= SVS Post Schwechat =

Austrian women's volleyball club

VB NÖ Sokol Post
- Full name: Volleyball Nieder-Österreich Sokol Post Sport-Vereinigung
- Short name: SG VB NÖ Sokol Post SV
- Ground: Neue Postsporthalle, Vienna
- Chairman: Peter Kutschera
- League: Austrian Volley League (AVL)
- 2017–18: 3rd
- Website: Club home page

Uniforms
Home	Away

VB Niederösterreich Sokol Post SV is an Austrian women's volleyball club based in Schwechat. It plays in the Austrian Volley League (AVL). The club is the most successful Austrian women's volleyball team in history, having won the national championship over 40 times.

The team constantly features in one of the European competitions, having played in all three CEV organized tournaments (CEV Champions League, CEV Cup and CEV Challenge Cup).

== History ==
Background

The origins of the club can be traced back to the 1860s, when the Sokol movement started to spread across the Austrian Empire. In 1867, when Austria-Hungary was formed, the Sokol Vienna society was founded.

Volleyball

Volleyball was introduced in Austria in 1925, initially being played and taught at the Komensky Real Gymnasium in Vienna X. During that time Sokol Vienna organized teams and tournaments, playing an important role to popularize the sport, and soon the club had volleyball sections in many different districts of Vienna. In 1953, Sokol was one of the founding members of the Austrian Volleyball Federation (German: Österreichischer Volleyball Verband). Today's women's volleyball team is a combination of the original Sokol V (later renamed Post SV) with SV Schwechat.

=== Previous names ===
Due to sponsorship, the club have competed under the following names:

- Sokol Wien (1867–1925)
- Sokol V Wien (1925–)
- TJ Sokol V Wien (1940s–)
- Post SV Wien (–1988)
- Post SV Wien-PSK (1988–1990)
- Post SV Wien-Teleges (1990–1994)
- Post SV Wien-Gulet (1994–1997)
- Fujitsu-Post SV Wien (1997–1999)
- Post SV Wien-Telekom Austria (1999–2000)
- Post SV Wien (2000–2001)
- SG SV Schwechat/PSV Telekom (2001–2002)
- SG SV Schwechat/PSV Kuoni (2002–2005)
- SG SV Schwechat/Post SV (2005–2009)
- SG SVS Post (2009–2016)
- VB Niederösterreich Post SV (2016–2017)
- VB NÖ Sokol Post (2017–present)

== Honours ==
Including Sokol Wien and Post Wien.

=== National competitions ===
- Austrian Championship: 46

1953, 1954, 1955, 1956, 1957, 1958, 1959, 1973, 1974, 1975, 1976, 1977, 1978, 1983, 1984, 1985, 1987, 1988, 1989, 1990, 1991, 1992, 1994, 1995, 1996, 1997, 1998, 1999, 2000, 2001, 2002, 2003, 2004, 2005, 2006, 2007, 2008, 2009, 2010, 2011, 2012, 2013, 2014, 2015, 2016, 2017

- Austrian Cup: 25

1981, 1982, 1985, 1986, 1987, 1989, 1990, 1994, 1995, 1996, 1997, 1998, 1999, 2000, 2001, 2002, 2003, 2005, 2006, 2010, 2012, 2013, 2014, 2015, 2016

=== Regional competitions ===
- Interleague: 5

1993, 1998, 1999, 2001, 2002
