= Russian American Football Championship =

League of American Football
- Formerly: Russian Championship
- Sport: American football
- Founded: 1991 / 2002 / 2016
- No. of teams: 6
- Country: Russia
- Most recent champion: Moscow Patriots
- Most titles: Moscow Patriots (15 titles)
- Broadcaster: LAF Network

Russian American Football Championship (Russian: Чемпионат России по Aмериканскому Футболу, romanized: Chempionat Rossii po Amerikanskomu Futbolu) is the highest level of American football played in Russia originally founded in 1991, previously known as the League of American Football (LAF; Russian: Лига Американского Футбола, romanized: Liga Amerikanskogo Futbola, ЛАФ).

There are 11 teams in two divisions participating in the league. Since 2020 season the Eastern European Super League serves as the highest league of American football in Russia.

== History ==
American football came into the Soviet Union in late 1980s. The first official games were played in 1989 when American high school all-star teams from Oklahoma played exhibition games against local teams, following a failed attempt to have college football bowl game be played in Moscow (known as the Glasnost Bowl). In the same year the very first game between Russian teams was played.

In 1989, the Moscow Bears were first formed team and represented the Russia national American football team. In 1991, the Soviet Championship was founded and the league became the Russian Championship in 1992 as the Soviet Union collapsed. However the league was soon suspended in the turmoils of the dissolution of the USSR. The Moscow Bears national team was reformed later in 1992 and Russian Football Championship league later re-organized.

The Russian Championship was founded again in 2002. The league has been growing ever since.

In 2016 it was reorganized as The League of American Football, LAF in short. But in 2019 the league was re-organized as Russian Championship.

Since 2020 season the Eastern European Super League serves as the highest league of American football in Russia.

== List of champions ==
Year	Champion	Runner-up	3rd place
1991 (USSR; Championship)	Moscow Bears	Moscow Swans	Kharkov Atlants; Aktau Caspian Sphinxes
1992	Moscow Bears	Krasnoyarsk Siberian Devils	Krasnoyarsk Siberian Bruins
1993	Moscow Bears	Krasnoyarsk Siberian Devils	Moscow Eagles
1994	Moscow Bears		
2002	Moscow Patriots	Moscow Bruins	
2003	Moscow Patriots	Moscow Bruins	Moscow Tanks — Astrakhan Gladiators
2004	Moscow Patriots	Moscow Bruins	Moscow Tanks — Astrakhan Gladiators
2005	Moscow Patriots		
2006	Moscow Patriots	Moscow Black Storm	Moscow Tanks
2007	Moscow Patriots	Moscow Tanks	
2008	Moscow Patriots	Moscow Tanks	
2009	Moscow Patriots		
2010	Moscow Patriots	Moscow Red Falcons	
2011	Moscow Patriots	Moscow United	
2012	Moscow Patriots	Chelyabinsk Scouts	
2013	Moscow Black Storm	Saint Petersburg Griffins	
2014	Moscow Patriots	Astrakhan Gladiators	
2015	Saint Petersburg Griffins	Moscow Patriots	
2016	Moscow Patriots	Moscow Spartans	
2017	Moscow Patriots	Saint Petersburg Griffins	
2018	Moscow Spartans	Moscow Patriots	
2019	Moscow Patriots	Perm Steel Tigers	
2020	Moscow Spartans	Perm Steel Tigers	Moscow Dragons
2021	Moscow Spartans	Moscow Patriots	Spartak Moscow
