= Moscow Patriots =

American football team from Moscow, Russia

Logo

General information
- Founded: October 3, 1999
- Headquartered: Moscow
- Website: www.moscowpatriots.com

League / conference affiliations
- Eastern European Super League; Center Division

Championships
- League championships: 15; 15

The Moscow Patriots are a professional American football team based in Moscow, Russia. The Patriots compete in the Eastern European Super League (EESL) as a member club of the Super League. Home games were played at Sapsan Arena.

== History ==
The team has been established on October 3, 1999.

The team is the most decorated American football team in Russia. Since 2002, the Patriots has won 15 champion titles.

== Season by season ==
=== LAF ===
Season	Regular season						Playoff						
	Wins	Draws	Losses	Games	PF	PS	Wins	Losses	Games	PF	PS	Result	Opponent
2017	6	0	1	7	277	20	2	0	2	61	26	Champion	Saint Petersburg Griffins
Totale	6	0	1	7	277	20	2	0	2	61	26		

Source: Enciclopedia del Football - A cura di Roberto Mezzetti

== Achievements ==
- Russian Championship / League of American Football

Champions (15): 2002-2012, 2014, 2016, 2017, 2019

- EFAF Eastern Cup

Champions (1) 2010
