= National Softball League =

- Current season, competition or edition: 2022 NSL 1 season 2022 NSL 2 season
- Sport: Softball
- Founder: Roger Grooms & Matthew Slorach
- First season: 2009
- Divisions: NSL1, NSL2
- Venue: Farnham Park
- Most recent champion: H2O
- Most titles: H2O (4)
- Website: eurosoftball.org

The National Softball League or NSL is a co-ed slowpitch softball league created for the 2009 British softball season (April–September). The league has run every season since then and grew to a two-division league in 2017. The inaugural season had 14 teams compete in three qualifying events, as well as the Premier Nationals (the top sports championship in the UK).

Twelve teams compete in NSL1 and twelve teams compete in NSL 2 with promotion and relegation taking place between the divisions. For 2019, the Manchester Thunder were relegated from NSL1 to NSL2 while the Manchester Mavericks were promoted from NSL2 to NSL1.

The 2018 season will see the addition of an NSL3 tournament in which eight teams will compete in a 2-day tournament. The top two finishing teams will replace the two relegated teams from NSL2 (Pyromaniacs & Outlaws) for the 2019 season.

The concept of the NSL is to improve the top level of co-ed slowpitch softball in the UK by exposing more players and teams to top-level competition.

The league's founders, Roger Grooms and Matthew Slorach, came up with the idea to link the already existing tournaments into a series, where points were awarded based on the finishing positions of teams at each event. This concept has been expanded upon where the NSL now provides a pre-defined fixture list for the season which makes sure each team plays all of the others in its division in a home and away format.

The 2020 National Softball League season was cancelled due to COVID-19. In 2021, the NSL season is set to resume with a slightly modified schedule - again, due to COVID-19. NSL1 & NSL2 teams will each play a shortened 11-game season. As a result, no teams will be promoted or relegated.

== Results ==
The winners and runners-up from each season of NSL play:

Year	NSL 1		NSL 2	
Year	Winner	Runner-up	Winner	Runner-up
2022	H2O	Legends	Tempest	The Mob
2019	Traveling Dodgers	Chromies	Blitz Bombers	Naturals
2018	Pioneers	Chromies	Mavericks	Warriors
2017	Chromies	Pioneers	KKs	Naturals
2016	Pioneers	H2O	Manchester Dodgers	Blitz
2015	Chromies	Slammers	N/A	
2014	Pioneers	Blue Steel	N/A	
2013	H2O	Pioneers	N/A	
2012	H2O	Pioneers	N/A	
2011	H2O	Chromies	N/A	
2010	H2O	Chromies	N/A	
2009	Chromies	Baker Tomkins	N/A	

== Current format ==
The two divisions for the 2021 season contain the following teams:

#	NSL 1	NSL 2
1	Bristol Tigers	Bristol Bees
2	Blitz Bombers	Fuzzy Ducks
3	Blue Steel	Honey Badgers
4	Chromies	Leeds Terriers
5	H2O	LNZ
6	KKs	The Mob
7	Legends	Naturals
8	Manchester Dodgers	Nino Privados
9	Manchester Greensox	SPAM
10	Manchester Mavericks	Spittin' Camels
11	Pioneers	Tempest
12	Windsor Knights	Warriors

== Inaugural 2009 season standings ==
The original 2009 teams and standings were:

NSL 2009 league standings
Team	points	RunsA
Chromies	43	141
Baker Tomkins	41	153
H2O	38	113
Pioneers	38	159
Slammers	35	138
Dragons	34	138
Munster	29	151
Los Amos de la Noche	29	214
Niners	25	173
Windsor Knights	22	201
Manchester Marvels	22	214
Coyotes	15	261
Nottingham Arrows	14	250
Solent Mariners	14	299

The benefits of the NSL were seen during the 2009 season with fourteen teams competing at the 2009 Premier Nationals (up from seven teams at the 2008 A Nationals, which they replaced), increased interest from sponsors in the sport, and television coverage of the final at the Bristol tournament.
