= Saint Petersburg Griffins =

General information
- Founded: 2005
- Headquartered: Saint Petersburg

League / conference affiliations
- League of American Football; Center

Championships
- League championships: 1; 2015

The Saint Petersburg Griffins (Russian: Санкт-Петербургские Грифоны) are a professional American football team based in Saint Petersburg, Russia.

The Griffins compete in the League of American Football (LAF) as a member club of the league's Center division. The Griffins have won one LAF Championships, including one Russian Bowl.

== Season by season ==
=== LAF ===
Season	Regular season						Playoffs						
	Wins	Draw	Losses	Games	PF	PS	Wins	Losses	Games	PF	PS	Result	Team
2017	5	0	2	7	190	89	1	1	2	19	36	Russian Bowl	Moscow Patriots
Total	5	0	2	7	190	89	1	1	2	19	36		

Source: Enciclopedia del Football - A cura di Roberto Mezzetti

== Achievements ==
- Russian Championship / League of American Football

Champions (1): 2015
Final (2): 2013, 2017

- Russian Cup

Champions (2): 2020
