= American football in Australia =

- Country: Australia
- Governing body: Gridiron Australia
- National team: Australia
- Registered players: 2,500 (total)
- Clubs: 73

International competitions
- IFAF World Championship

Audience records
- Single match: 73,811 (1999). Denver Broncos vs San Diego Chargers (ANZ Stadium, Sydney)

American football, known locally as "gridiron", is a participation and spectator sport in Australia. The sport is represented by Gridiron Australia, a member of the International Federation of American Football (IFAF), and also Gridiron Victoria, which operates independent of Gridiron Australia

The sport has been played in six Australian states and territories across the country since World War II, but has only had regular league play since 1983. There is no uniform gridiron season in Australia. The various state and territory bodies play at different times of the year. There are currently 73 junior and senior teams playing gridiron in Australia. The national team has competed in the IFAF World Cup and other international competitions.

American football has an increasing media profile in Australia. The National Football League is broadcast on both free-to-air television through 7mate and subscription television through the Fox Sports and ESPN channels available on Foxtel and Austar, including the Super Bowl live on the Seven Network. Due to interest in converts from Australian rules football and Rugby League, particularly Ben Graham, Saverio Rocca and Jarryd Hayne, the game is also regularly covered by the Herald Sun and other newspapers.

== History ==
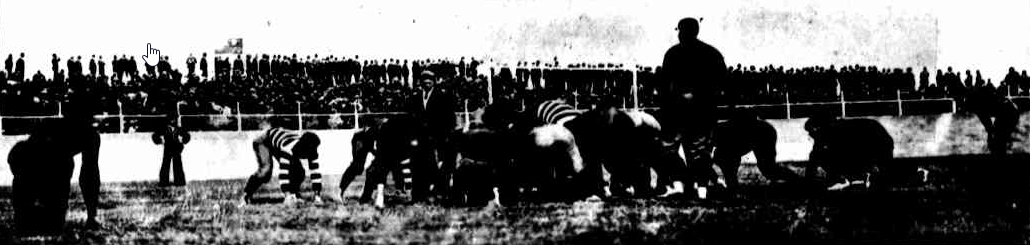
American Football witnessed by 14000 in Sydney in 1906

Some of the earliest matches in Australia involved visiting American servicemen. A match in Sydney between crews of the USS Baltimore in May 1906 attracted 14,000 people who watched the Stripes defeat Brown 10 to 4.

On 1 September 1908, following the Jubilee Australasian Football Carnival, Minnesota played Kentucky on the Melbourne Cricket Ground in front of a crowd of 5,000. The game was not well received and was described as a "scramble" and criticised for its unnecessary roughness by the Melbourne press.

In 1925 a match was held between crews of the USS Trenton and USS Pennsylvania at the Punt Road Oval in Melbourne. A similar match was played at the Sydney Showground. Both attracted interest and crowds.

In 1932 rugby league administrator Harry Sunderland proposed assembling an Australian gridiron team to send to America however cynics in the Australian media saw it as an attempt to promote rugby league in America rather than to promote gridiron in Australia.

=== Post-war ===
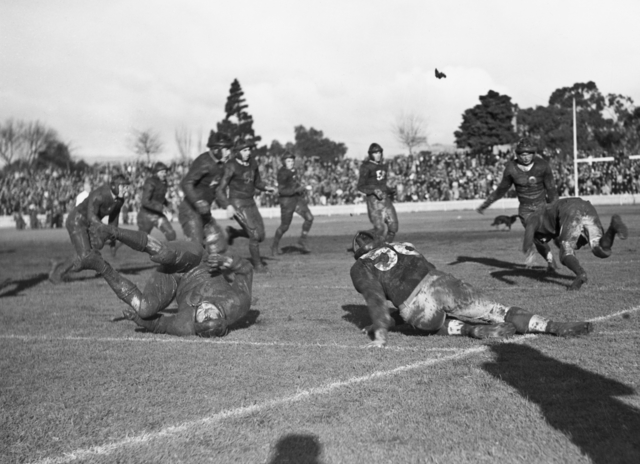
A match in Adelaide as part of American Independence Day celebrations in 1942

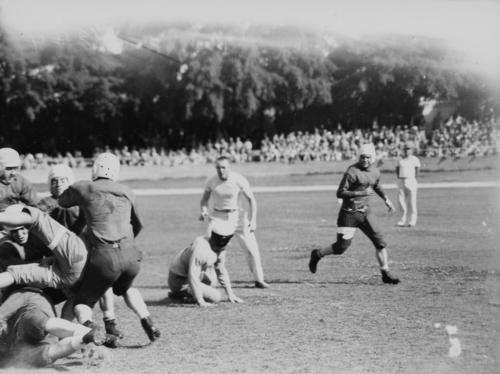
Action at the gridiron football match held in Brisbane between American ex-servicemen in 1944

A high-profile match in Adelaide played on American Independence Day (4 July) 1942 by American servicemen attracted a crowd of 25,000.

Several matches were played in Sydney in 1943 and another high-profile match was played in Brisbane in 1944, all featuring American servicemen. Another match was held in Melbourne at an unknown date during the war.

Matches of Austus were also played against Australian rules footballers featuring a set of compromise rules.

However, the game did not take hold in Australia after the war.

=== First local leagues ===
On the 25th of January, 1981, two 'teams' met on a Hockey field on Soldiers Road in the southern Sydney suburb of Jannali for the first competitive game of American Football played by locals. They were, the Waverley Oval Raiders (later, Waverley Raiders and then Bondi Raiders and the Como Yams). The Raiders were a group of mates organised by Wessley McGrath and Stephen Jones - two mad-keen American sports fans. The Yams were a group of mates who played basketball in the southern Sydney competition pulled together by Brad Pinkerton. McGrath and Pinkerton both worked at the same employer. No helmets, rugby league type padding and the vaguest understanding of the rules but all participants had a blast and organised to meet again two weeks later.

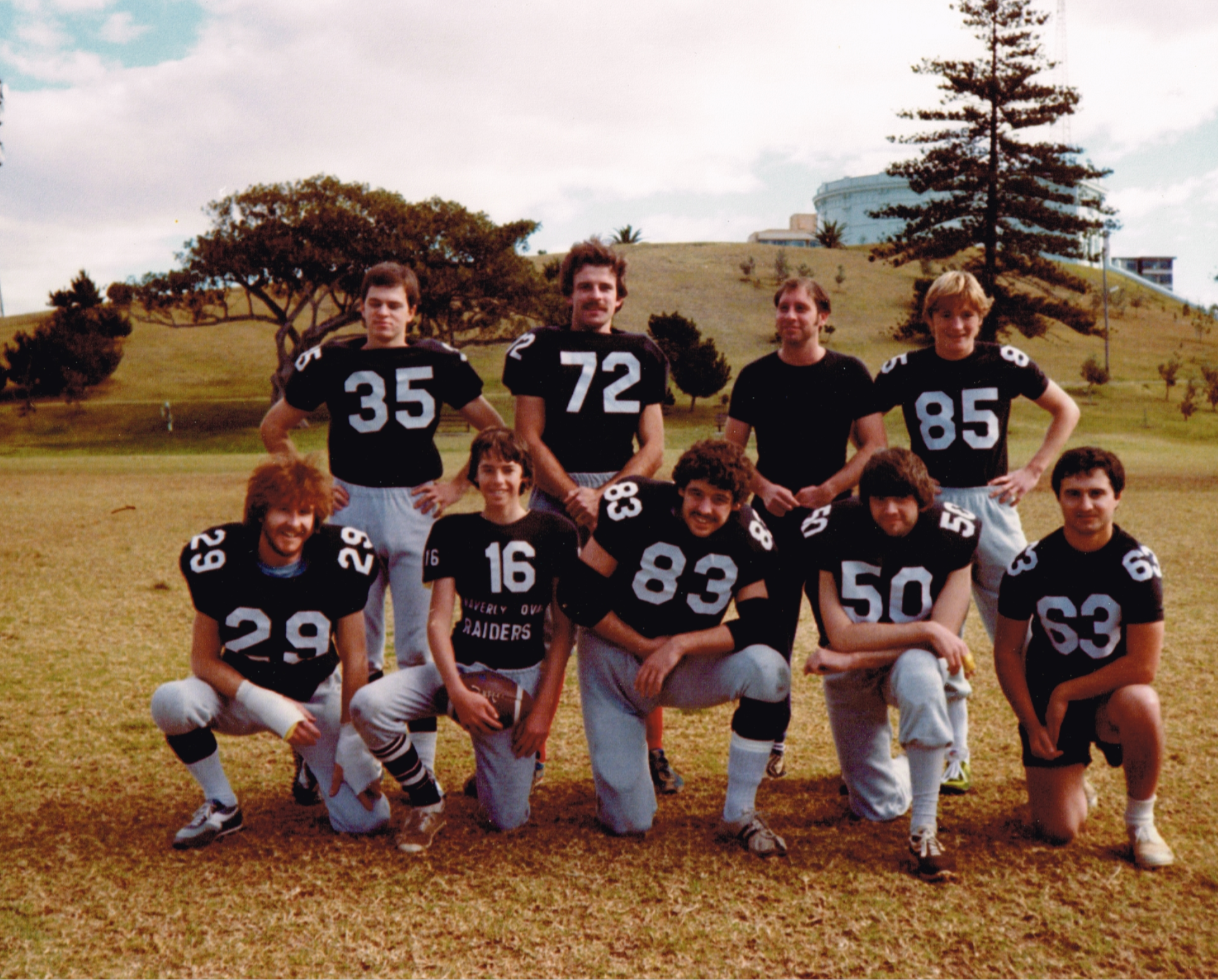
The Waverley Oval Raiders, February 1981.

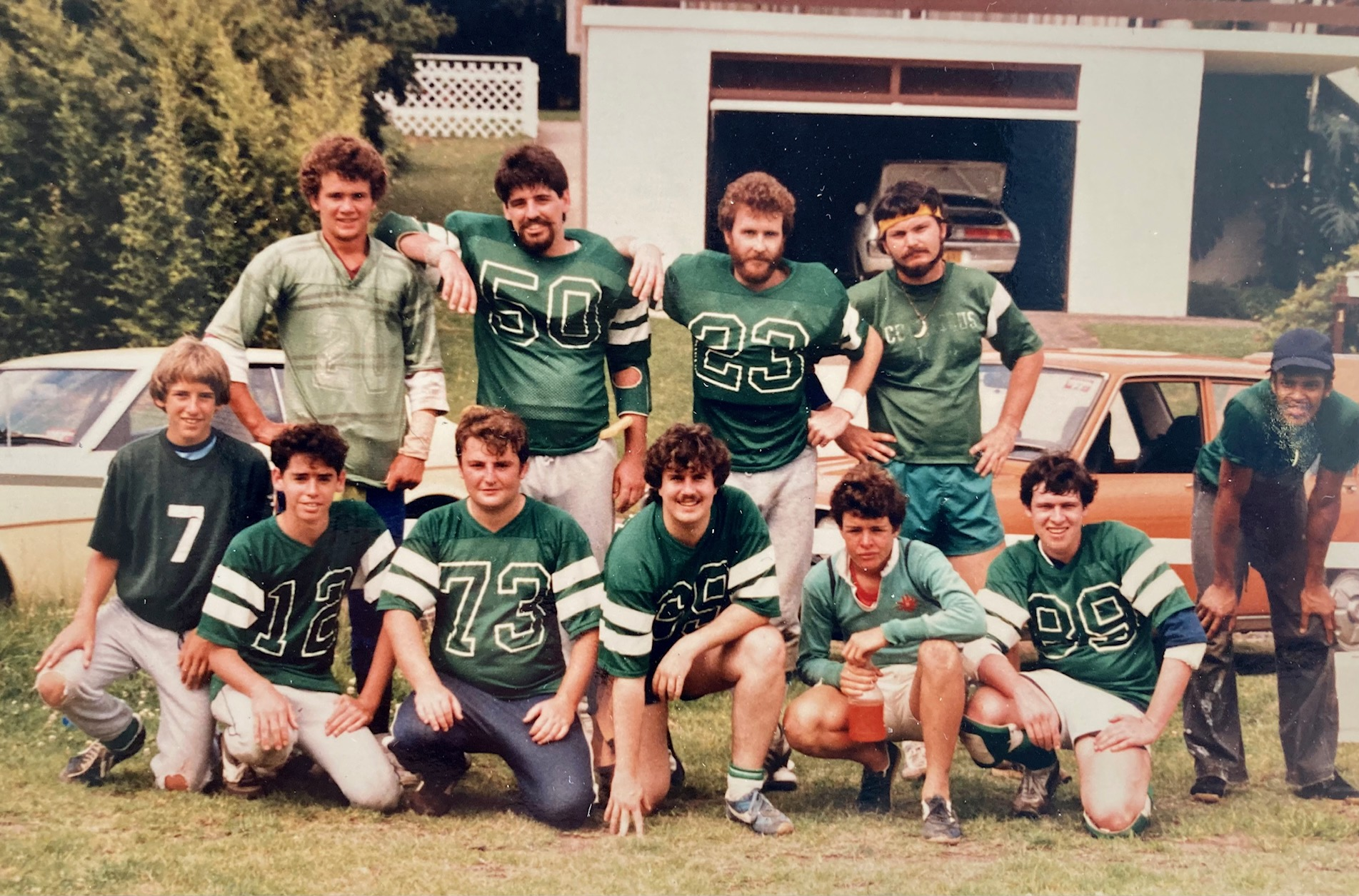
Waverley Raiders at Newport Dolphins 18/12/1984.

Over the next 3 years, the Waverley Raiders played 19 games against various squads throughout Sydney from places such as Sutherland, Fairfield, Newport and Como. All players played both ways and the games were full contact.

Meanwhile, in 1983, the first fully organised gridiron teams in Australia were formed in Melbourne, Victoria. These teams, the Melbourne Steelers and the Frankston Outlaws, had regular practices and coaches and began playing each other semi-regularly. The Raiders became aware of them after seeing a feature on a TV sports show. Stephen Jones made contact with the Melbourne squads in February 1984 (through the late James White) and he and Wessley McGrath drove south to meet fellow enthusiasts and proposed an interstate clash. That game took place on 4 March 1984 at Sydney's Centennial Park on a fully lined field, with officials. The NSW team was composed of players from the Raiders, the Yams, the Sutherland team and the Dolphins of Newport. The Victorian team was composed of members of the aforementioned Steelers, Outlaws and possibly the Monash Vipers. The NSW team won the game 30-7. The game was filmed by Channel Nine (Sydney) and later shown on Nine's Wide World of Sports.

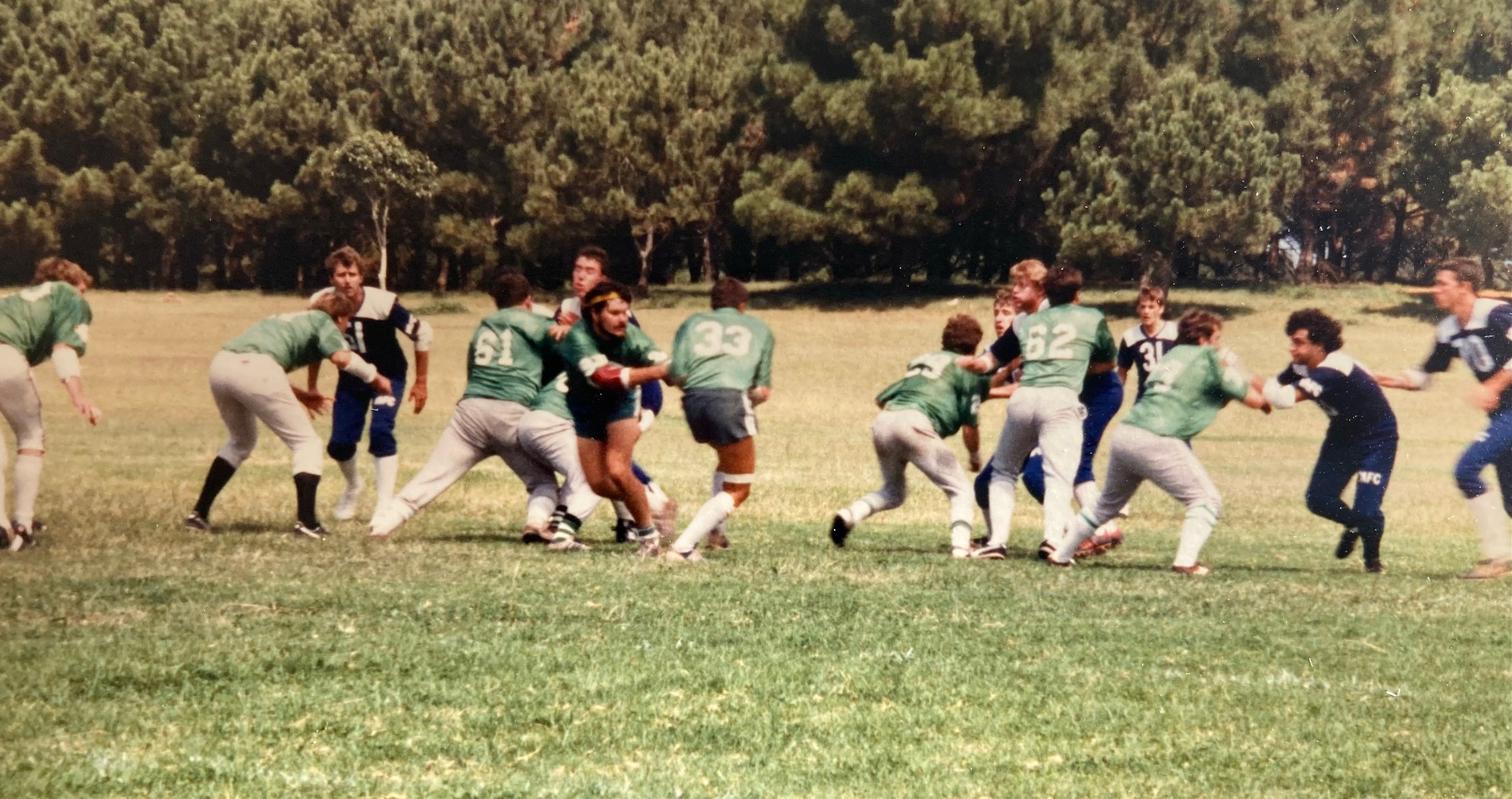
Centennial Park, Sydney in March 1984

This airing resulted in a number of people contacting Stephen Jones with interest in forming teams. Ken and Debbie Jarrett were such people and placed an ad on a Sydney radio station advertising for American football enthusiasts to assemble. The response was remarkable, meetings were held and in a matter of weeks, seven teams were created and the Australian-American Football Conference was born. Those teams were - the Waverley Raiders, Sydney University Stormtroopers, Double Bay Buccaneers, Canterbury Cougars, Fairfield Argonauts, Parramatta Saxons and the North Shore Redbacks.

Eight weeks after the NSW-VIC game, the opening games of the AAFC season took place on Sunday 29 April, at Riverstone (the field sat over an old rubbish tip on reclaimed land that was a quagmire at times during the season) featuring the Argonauts and the Buccaneers (a 26-0 win to the Argos) and, fittingly, the Raiders and Sydney University (an 18-0 win to the Students). There was no medical supervision and no insurance. The early pioneers padded up any way they could (Clark Rubber must had made a fortune) and the linemen found kick-boxing protective headgear useful.

The Sydney University Stormtroopers hosted a mid-week 4 July game against the Fairfield Argonauts, the first such game under lights in Australia. Unfortunately it was a miserable night and the conditions defeated both teams and the game ended in a 0-0 tie.

The Canterbury Cougars posted an impressive 13-0 record before winning their semi-final 55 to 6 over the Buccaneers. The University Stormtroopers finished 8-3-2 and won a hard fought semi-final 13-6 over the Argonauts.

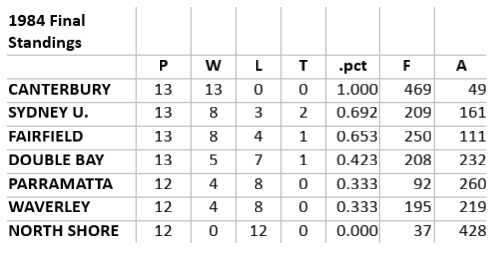
Final Standings 1984 AAFC.

The inaugural Grand Final was played at Sydney's Lidcombe Oval on 21 October with the Cougars triumphant over the Stormtroopers 19-7.

Also in 1984 the Australian Kookaburras were founded by Randall Trudgen. It was a high-profile team which, hopefully, the media and sponsors would see as a positive entity to promote the sport. The first Kookaburras embarked on an extensive tour to the US, training at US Colleges. The LA Rams assisted in hosting the Kookaburras. The Kookaburras would tour the US and Europe annually until 1992.

In Melbourne, four teams contested the inaugural season of Gridiron Victoria in 1984 - the Melbourne Steelers, the Frankston Outlaws, the Croydon Rangers (the Monash Vipers re-branded) and the Geelong Wildcats.

By 1985 football equipment began to be imported into Australia. Coaches came from the University of Hawaii for clinics and to help train players. These efforts helped lay the foundation for the sport to develop in Australia so that other leagues could start up around the country.

In 1985 the first organised competition was played in Queensland. The 1st year of competition of the Queensland Gridiron Football League was contested by four clubs, the Brisbane Bulldogs, the Mitchelton Warriors, the Pine Grove Steelers, and the Kenmore Centurions. Unable to gain access to the usual equipment of the game, the teams took the field in the 1st year in makeshift padding and uniforms (without helmets) while still utilising all the normal rules of the games. In the Championship game, SUNBOWL I, the Brisbane Bulldogs defeated the Mitchelton Warriors 5–2.

In January 1986 the inaugural South Australian Gridiron Association season commenced with 4 teams: Eastside Razorbacks, Brighton Breakers, Port Adelaide Spartans and Southern Longhorns playing Saturday double-header games at Norwood Oval which had high standard lighting to play under.

In November 1989 the Grand Prix Challenge was held in Adelaide, a four-way competition involving Victoria, South Australia, Western Australia and New South Wales. New South Wales went on to win the Challenge.

In 1990 the Down Under Bowl tournament commenced in Australia and is still going strong. Each year individual American States are invited to field High School all-star teams, travel to Australia and spread the growth of the game down under. Games are played against local Australian teams and between US teams. 1998 saw the most successful year yet with 36 teams travelling to the Gold Coast in Queensland to compete in the Down Under Bowl.

Trans Tasman competition came to Melbourne in January 1991 when Victoria played the visiting South Auckland Raiders from New Zealand, finishing in a 19–19 draw.

A series of interstate Bowl games were to be played between all major States in October/November 1991. The Victorians were rewarded with a good win. The following week saw the NSW state team go down to the Victorian Eagles at Olympic Park. This left Victoria as the National State Champions for 1991.

The National Gridiron League of Australia (NGLA) was formed in January 1991 "to govern and promote American football on the national level and to represent Australian gridiron on the international scene."

Gridiron Australia (GA) was formed in 1994, with the aim of replacing the old National Gridiron League of Australia. By 1995 American football was being played in every State and Territory in Australia, a total of approximately 100 teams.

In 1995 Darren Bennett became the third Australian to play in the NFL when he was selected as the punter for the San Diego Chargers. The first Australian to play in the NFL was Colin Ridgeway, who played Aussie Rules for Carlton Football Club in the 1960s before being picked up by the Dallas Cowboys as a punter. After him came Colin Scotts, who went to college in Hawaii before being drafted to play with the Phoenix Cardinals and then the Houston Oilers in the middle to late 1980s.

Gridiron Australia's First National Championships were held in the nation's capital, Canberra, in January 1996. Both senior and junior teams from New South Wales, the ACT, Victoria and South Australia attended. South Australia won the Senior Championship 34-0 and New South Wales won the Junior Championship 12–8.

In 1996, 24 US teams toured Australia and New Zealand as part of Down Under Bowl VIII. Both Victoria and South Australia recorded wins over US teams.

In 1997 the Australia Day Championships were held in Sydney, with Queensland taking the Championship.

In 1997 Australia resumed its international campaign, against New Zealand. On 1 August 1997 the Australian Bushrangers played the New Zealand Haka in Auckland, New Zealand. The game, the inaugural Anzac Bowl, was a great success.

On 7 January the Australian American Football League (AAFL) was formed.

On 31 January 1998 the Bushrangers played Team Hawaii in Honolulu during the National Football League's Pro Bowl week. Trips to Europe and Japan are also planned. Australia has participated in the Gridiron World Cup since 1999.

In May 1998 the AAFL was dissolved, with Gridiron Australia becoming the only National body involved in the management of Gridiron matters in Australia.

On August 7, 1999, the first American Bowl in Australia was played in Sydney between the Denver Broncos and San Diego Chargers at Stadium Australia, the first American pro football game to be held in the Southern Hemisphere. The game attendance was announced at 73,811 spectators.

In 2001, the 2nd Gridiron Australia National Championships were played in Canberra again with 6 states competing. Western Australia defeated New South Wales in the final.

In 2003 & 2005 the week long Gridiron Australia National Championships were played at the Pines Hockey Stadium in Adelaide, both won by New South Wales.

In 2008, Ten HD announced it would televise the NFL season on free-to-air television, including the Super Bowl live.

In March 2012, the inaugural Australian Gridiron League series was launched, with state teams from New South Wales, Queensland, Victoria and Western Australia participating. Australia hosted two games of the 2012 LFL All-Fantasy Game Tour Two exhibition games between the Eastern and Western Conferences took place on Australia's east coast in Brisbane and Sydney. Queensland native and wide receiver for the Los Angeles Temptation Chloe Butler served as the ambassador of LFL Football coming to Australia and captained the Western Conference squad.

The first Women's Gridiron competition in Australia the Female Gridiron League of Queensland (FGLQ) was launched in 2012 with 3 teams: The Logan City Jets, The Kenmore Panthers and the Gold Coast Sea Wolves. An initiative of the Logan City Gridiron Football Club who developed the competition, the inaugural season was the very first Women's 'Full Kit' Gridiron Competition in Australia. The Logan City Jets were crowned Summerbowl I winners after defeating the Kenmore Panthers. Season 2013 saw the FGLQ expand to 4 teams: Logan City Jets, Kenmore Panthers, Gold Coast Stingrays (as the Gold Coast Stingrays organisation took over running the Gold Coast Sea Wolves) and the new Ipswich Jaguars (joining from the Ipswich Cougars club). Another successful season culminated in the Gold Coast Stingrays defeating the Logan City Jets in Summerbowl II. In season 2014 the competition looks set to expand again with new teams joining including: the Southern Steelers, Sunshine Coast Spartans and a Moreton Bay/Redcliffe side. Gridiron Queensland has taken over responsibility of the FGLQ after two highly successful years of development under the LCGFC banner.

The first interstate women's games were played in 2012 with the Western Foxes hosting the Tuggeranong Tornadoes from Canberra, with the Tornadoes winning. A Queensland 'All Stars', side selected from ladies who had played in the inaugural FGLQ season, soon traveled to Victoria to play the Western Foxes with the Queensland side winning.

In 2013, Gridiron Australia established the National Club Championship (NCC) Rankings and, on 11 August 2013, staged the first National Club Championship Game, with the #1 ranked Sydney Uni Lions defeating the #2 ranked Gold Coast Stingrays 45–13 at the Square, Sydney University.

LFL Australia premiered in December 2013. The New South Wales Surge, Queensland Brigade, Victoria Maidens, and Western Australia Angels played in the inaugural 2013–14 LFL Australia season, but it was later replaced by the Ladies Gridiron League.

In August 2014, a representative team from Western Australia played the Philippines Aguilas in Manila winning 56-7 and in 2015, Gridiron South Australia celebrated its 30th season.

Since 2014, Victoria has run its own league, Gridiron Victoria, independent and unaffiliated with Gridiron Australia. Gridiron Victoria is composed of 11 clubs, with thriving Senior Men's, Women, and Colts competitions.

In 2016 plans were announced for a National Gridiron League. However the inaugural season was postponed to October 2017.

On 6 February 2025, the National Football League officially announced that a multi-season deal had been made between the NFL and the Victoria State Government to bring multiple regular season NFL games to Melbourne, Victoria, Australia. Part of the NFL International Series, the NFL Melbourne Games will be played at the Melbourne Cricket Ground starting in 2026, with the Los Angeles Rams being the designated home team for the first game.

== See also ==
- Gridiron Australia
- Australians in American football
