= Down Under (disambiguation) =

Down Under is a colloquialism which refers to Australia.

Down Under may also refer to:

- "Down Under" (song), by Australian rock band Men at Work
- Down Under (album), an album by Bill Cosby
- Down Under (book), a 2000 travelogue about Australia by Bill Bryson
- Down Under (1927 film), a film directed by Harry Southwell
- Down Under (2016 film), an Australian film starring Damon Herriman
- "Down under", a euphemism for genitalia
- "Down Under", a song by Blonde Redhead from La Mia Vita Violenta

== See also ==
- Down Under Bowl, a high-school American football tournament in Australia
- Tour Down Under and Down Under Classic, a road cycling races in Australia
- Land Down Under (disambiguation)
- RuPaul's Drag Race Down Under, the Australian and New Zealand localization of the Drag Race franchise.
