= Gridiron in Western Australia =

American-football originating from Australia

Gridiron or American Football was first played in Western Australia after a recruiting effort was organised in 1988. This also sparked interest in the local area leading to the formation of W.A.G.F.L. or Western Australian Gridiron Football League.

== W.A.G.F.L. 1988-1997 ==
Originally meant to only consist of two teams The Northside Chargers and The Southside Seahawks there was enough interest to start the league with 3 teams as the Bassendean Broncos(now Perth Broncos) were formed as well.

The first organised Gridiron game to be played in W.A. (Western Australia) took place between the Southside Seahawks and Bassendean Broncos at Jubilee Oval in September 1988. The final score of the game was 2–0 in favour of the Broncos, the only score being on a safety.

After a brief 3 team season in 1988 W.A.G.F.L. kick started again in Feb 1989 with a 4th team, the Claremont Jets, being added to the fold.

W.A.G.F.L. would also later include teams known as the Mount Lawley Bengals, Forrestfield Falcons, East Perth Vikings, West Coast Buccaneers, Westside Steelers, Wanneroo/Joondalup Bears and the Hyde Park Giants.

== Separation of gridiron in W.A. ==
In 1994 a second league was formed leaving two separate four-team leagues running initially

W.A.G.F.L. remaining Teams at this point

- Claremont Jets
- Mount Lawley Bengals
- Westside Steelers
- Southside Seahawks

== Gridiron West 1994-current ==
Gridiron West was formed as a breakaway competition in 1994

Gridiron West is Also a current member of Gridiron Australia.

Original Gridiron West Teams

- Bassendean/Perth Broncos
- Hyde Park Giants
- Curtin Saints
- Wanneroo/Joondalup Bears
- Rockingham Dolphins ** New team for 1994

Gridiron West later included the Southern River/Armadale Panthers, Bunbury Raiders and the West Coast Buccaneers.

Due to the W.A.G.F.L folding in 1996, the Claremont Jets and Westside Steelers joined Gridiron West, with the Rockingham Dolphins merging with the Southside Seahawks to become the Rockingham Vipers and Gridiron West is now W.A's only Gridiron league.

Three further teams have since joined Gridiron West, those being Perth Blitz (renaming of Perth Giants), The West Coast Fire (based in Gosnells) and the West Coast Wolverines (based in Scarborough).

== Junior gridiron in Western Australia ==
Gridiron West introduced junior level Gridiron in 2004. Originally introduced in a seven-man format, junior Gridiron in Western Australia is currently played as nine man football.

== Western Australian Raiders ==
The Western Australian Raiders is the representative team for Western Australia at National level. This also includes the Junior Raiders who are Western Australia's under—18 team.

The Western Australian Raiders were crowned National Champions in 2001 and have followed this result up with consistent performances finishing no lower than 3rd at National Championship Competition.

The Western Australian Junior Raiders placed 4th in their only campaign in 2007. The Raiders finished 3rd at N.C.C. at the Gold Coast in 2009 and a very close 2nd place at the N.C.C. at Narrabeen, Sydney in 2011.

== Current teams ==
- Perth Broncos
- Curtin Saints
- Claremont Jets
- Rockingham Vipers
- Swan City Titans
- West Coast Wolverines
- Vincent City Ducks
- Western Australian Raiders (representative teams)
- Western Australian Junior Raiders (representative team)

== Previous teams ==
- Northside Chargers
- Southside Seahawks
- Mount Lawley Bengals
- Forrestfield Falcons
- East Perth Vikings
- West Coast Buccaneers
- Wanneroo/Joondalup Bears
- Southern River/Armadale Panthers
- Hyde Park Giants
- Rockingham Dolphins
- Bunbury Raiders
- Westside Steelers
- Murdoch University Vikings
- Perth Blitz

== See also ==
- Gridiron in Australia
- American football
- List of leagues of American football
- Gridiron Australia
