= Land Down Under =

Land Down Under may refer to:

- Down Under, a colloquialism used to refer to Australia and New Zealand, or the Pacific island countries collectively
- "Down Under" (song), a song by Men at Work
- Love Me Again (Land Down Under), a Filipino film initially titled Land Down Under

== See also ==
- Down Under (disambiguation)
