= Gridiron NSW =

- Formerly: NSW Gridiron Football League (NSWGFL) (1984-2007)
- Sport: Gridiron; American football
- Founded: 1984
- No. of teams: 8 (2024)
- Country: New South Wales; Australia
- Headquarters: Sydney; Australia
- Most recent champions: (Men); UNSW Raiders (Women); Northern Sydney Rebels (Colts); Nepean Ducks (Juniors); Wollongong Mustangs
- Most titles: Sydney University Lions (22 titles)
- Website: gridironnsw.org.au

Gridiron NSW, originally known as NSW Gridiron Football League (NSWGFL) until 2007, is the state governing body for American football (otherwise known as 'gridiron') in the state of New South Wales, Australia. It administers tackle and flag football competitions across men’s, women’s, colt's, and junior divisions and oversees the development of the sport under Gridiron Australia.

Founded in 1984, Gridiron NSW is the longest-running American football organisation in Australia. It succeeded the Australian American Football Conference (AAFC) after its inaugural season and continued as the state’s primary competition following the dissolution of the breakaway competition NSW Premier State Gridiron League in 1996.

Gridiron NSW currently oversees four divisions, comprising two tackle leagues—Men’s (18+ years) and Colts (16–19 years)—and two flag football leagues—Women’s (18+ years) and Juniors (8–15 years).

The two top teams in each division participate in their respective bowl games - Waratah Bowl (Men), Sapphire Bowl (Women), Kookaburra Bowl (Colts) and Harbour Bowl (Juniors) respectively. These games and also known as the State Finals. The Opal Bowl, formerly contested in the women’s tackle competition, was retired after the 2024 season following the division’s transition to flag football.

The Sydney University Lions hold the record for the most Waratah Bowl championships, with 21 titles overall, including 16 consecutive championships from 2003 to 2018. The streak ended in 2019, when the Northern Sydney Rebels defeated the UNSW Raiders 38–32 in the Waratah Bowl.

Each season, the top-performing players from across the league are selected to represent New South Wales at the Australian Gridiron League National Championships. These representative teams compete under the names the Wolfpack (Men), Coyotes (Women), and Wolverines (Colts).

Following the demise of the Newcastle Kings, the Hunter Gridiron League was launched as a separate competition for players in the Newcastle and Hunter Valley area of NSW.

== League Members ==
=== Current members ===
- UNSW Raiders
- Northern Sydney Rebels
- Nepean Ducks
- Sutherland Seahawks
- Sydney University Lions
- UTS Gators
- Wollongong Mustangs

=== Former Members ===
==== Former Senior Teams ====
- Army
- Astros
- Blacktown Vikings
- Canberra Sabretooths
- Canterbury Cougars
- Central Coast Sharks
- Central West Giants
- Concord Jaguars
- Eastern Suburbs Buccaneers
- Fairfield Argonauts
- Hills District Eagles
- Manly Redbacks
- Newcastle Cobras
- Newcastle Kings
- Newcastle Uni Thunder
- North Western Rebels
- North Western Predators
- Parramatta Bears
- Parramatta Saxons
- Penrith Outlaws
- Ryde Spartans
- St George Fireballs
- Tempe Jets/Mascot Jets
- UC Stars
- West Sydney Pirates
- Western Wolverines

==== Former Junior Teams ====
- Blacktown Stars
- Caringbah Chargers
- Casula Bears
- Eastside Colts
- Lansvale Trojans
- Newcastle Pirates
- North Shore Falcons
- North Western Panthers
- Penrith City Chiefs
- Penrith Wolverines

== Championship Game History ==
=== Men - Waratah Bowl ===
Year	Champion	Runner-up	Score
2025	UNSW Raiders (10)	UTS Gators	48-6
2024	UNSW Raiders (9)	UTS Gators	70-42
2023	UNSW Raiders (8)	Sydney University Lions	48-25
2022	Sydney University Lions (22)	Northern Sydney Rebels	35-0
2021	SEASON CANCELLED DUE TO COVID-19		**
2020	Sydney University Lions (21)	UTS Gators	25-12
2019	Northern Sydney Rebels (1)	UNSW Raiders	38-32
2018	Sydney University Lions (20)	UNSW Raiders	33-16
2017	Sydney University Lions (19)	West Sydney Pirates	17–0
2016	Sydney University Lions (18)	West Sydney Pirates	20–19
2015	Sydney University Lions (17)	West Sydney Pirates	36–18
2014	Sydney University Lions (16)	West Sydney Pirates	42–14
2013	Sydney University Lions (15)	NorthWestern Predators	83–18
2012	Sydney University Lions (14)	UTS Gators	38–0
2011	Sydney University Lions (13)	West Sydney Pirates	47–8
2010	Sydney University Lions (12)	UTS Gators	37–0
2009	Sydney University Lions (11)	UTS Gators	34–26
2008	Sydney University Lions (10)	West Sydney Pirates	38–34
2007	Sydney University Lions (9)	UTS Gators	34–28
2006	Sydney University Lions (8)	UTS Gators	34–26
2005	Sydney University Lions (7)	Bondi Raiders	23–0
2004	Sydney University Lions (6)	West Sydney Pirates	32–7
2003	Sydney University Lions (5)	UWS Outlaws	38–21
2002	UWS Outlaws (1)	Sydney University Lions	33–18
2001	Sutherland Seahawks (3)	Sydney University Lions	28–21
2000	Sutherland Seahawks (2)	Sydney University Lions	12–6
1999	Bondi Raiders (7)	Sutherland Seahawks	9-7
1998	Bondi Raiders (6)	ACT Astros	10–3
1997	Sutherland Seahawks (1)	ACT Astros	21–17
1996	ACT Astros (1)	Sydney University Lions	14–0
1995	Sydney University Lions (4)	ACT Astros	13–3
1994	Canberra Sabretooths (1)	Manly Redbacks	10–6
1993	Manly Redbacks (1)	Sydney University Lions	14–13
1992	Sydney University Lions (3)	Bondi Raiders	14–6
1991	Bondi Raiders (5)	Sydney University Lions	14–12
1990	Bondi Raiders (4)	Sydney University Lions	16–13
1989	Bondi Raiders (3)	Sydney University Lions	14–13
1988	Bondi Raiders (2)	Hills District Eagles	??-??
1987	Bondi Raiders (1)	Eastern Suburbs Buccaneers	25-0
1986	Sydney University Lions (2)	Fairfield Argonauts	20–0
1985	Sydney University Lions (1)	Bondi Raiders	15–9
1984	Canterbury Cougars (1)	Sydney University Stormtroopers (Lions)	19–7

=== Women - Opal Bowl ===
Year	Champion	Runner-up	Score
2024	UNSW Raiders (6)	UC Stars	32-20
2023	UNSW Raiders (5)	Northern Sydney Rebels	18-14
2022	Northern Sydney Rebels (2)	UNSW Raiders	36-8
2021	SEASON CANCELLED DUE TO COVID-19		**
2020	Northern Sydney Rebels (1)	UNSW Raiders	30-24
2019	UNSW Raiders (4)	Northern Sydney Rebels	22-8
2018	Sydney University Lions (1)	Northern Sydney Rebels	14-16
2017	UNSW Raiders (3)	Canberra Diamonds	28-18
2016	UNSW Raiders (2)	NorthWestern Phoenix	40-6
2015	UNSW Raiders (1)	UTS Gators	40-16
2014	UTS Gators (1)	Newcastle Cobras	42-26
2013	NorthWestern Phoenix (1)	Newcastle Cobras	28-12

== NSW Premier State Gridiron League ==
New South Wales Premier State Gridiron League
- Sport: American football
- Founded: 1993
- Folded: 1996
- Country: Australia

The NSW Premier State Gridiron League (NSWPSGL) was formed by members who had broken away from the NSW Gridiron Football League (NSWGFL), which was the only American football league operating in New South Wales at the time, following internal disagreements. The league operated from 1993 to 1996. During this period, it also administered the NSW Premier State Youth Gridiron League (NSWPSYGL), Australia’s first junior gridiron competition.

In its inaugural 1993 season, the league comprised six teams: the Bondi Raiders, Liverpool Pirates, L.U.S.C. Argonauts, Mascot Jets, Newcastle Cobras, and Wollongong Mustangs. After four seasons of competition, the league was disbanded prior to the commencement of the 1997 season, with its teams rejoining the NSW Gridiron Football League.

=== NSW Premier State Youth Gridiron League ===
New South Wales Premier State Youth Gridiron League
- Sport: American football
- Founded: 1993
- Folded: 1996
- Country: Australia

The origins of the NSW Premier State Youth Gridiron League (NSWPSYGL) may be traced to the establishment in 1991 of the first two junior teams in New South Wales: Blacktown Starrs and Penrith Wolverines. The teams played two exhibition games at Penrith Park and Parramatta Stadium in June and July 1991 before games between touring US Down Under Bowl high school teams from North Dakota and Colorado.

In its inaugural 1993 season, the Penrith City Chiefs defeated the North Shore Falcons 32-0 in the State Championship Game.

In 1994, the NSWPSYGL consisted of 5 teams: Caringbah Chargers, Eastside Colts, Lansvale Trojans, North Shore Falcons and Penrith City Chiefs. The 1994 season ended with the Penrith City Chiefs being crowned State Champions following an amazing 13-12 comeback victory against the North Shore Falcons in the State Championship Game on 29 May 1994. Trailing 12-6 late in the 4th quarter, quarterback Graeme Pollard led the Chiefs on a final drive, ultimately connecting with wide receiver Andrew Stowe in the end zone for the game winning score, with just 47 seconds remaining.

The Penrith City Chiefs completed a three-peat in the 1995 season and in the NSWPSYGL’s final season in 1996, the newly formed Casula Bears won the State Championship. The Casula Bears also heavily recruited players from the Penrith City Chiefs, who had since moved to the NSW Gridiron League. The team went on to once again beat Bondi in the State Championship game.

== See also ==
- Gridiron Australia
