= Asher Ghioto =

American football player

No. 34 – Bolles Bulldogs
- Position: Defensive end
- Class: Junior

Personal information
- Listed height: 6 ft 5 in (1.96 m)
- Listed weight: 240 lb (109 kg)

Career information
- High school: Bolles (Jacksonville, Florida)

Asher Ghioto is an American football defensive end at The Bolles School in Jacksonville, Florida. He is a consensus top-10 recruit in the class of 2028.

== Early life ==
Ghioto began playing football at age five. He grew up as a fan of Georgia Bulldogs football, which inspired him to wear the No. 34 jersey in honor of Herschel Walker. Ghioto attended Swiss Point Middle School in Jacksonville, Florida. As an eighth grader, he helped the football team win the 2023 county championship while playing fullback and defensive end at 6 ft 3 in (1.91 m) tall.

Ghioto enrolled at The Bolles School in Jacksonville for high school. As a freshman, he recorded 66 tackles, including a team-high 21 tackles for loss and seven sacks, and one fumble recovery, helping the team to a 10–2 record. Ghioto earned News4Jax third-team all-area honors. He was also named a first-team freshman All-American by MaxPreps.

As a sophomore, Ghioto recorded 84 tackles, 35 tackles for loss, and a school-record 23 sacks, to go with one forced fumble, one fumble recovery, and one interception. He helped the Bulldogs to a 13–2 record and an appearance in the Florida High School Athletic Association Class 2A state championship game. Ghioto was named the Florida Times-Union All-First Coast Defensive Player of the Year and the News4JAX Defensive Player of the Year. He also earned second-team All-American and first-team sophomore All-American accolades from Rivals.com.

Ghioto trained with former NFL defensive lineman Adam Gotsis ahead of his junior year.

=== Recruiting ===
Ghioto received his first college offer from UCF in May 2024, when he was in the eighth grade. He "immediately [became] one of the nation’s most coveted prospects" following his freshman season and, by July 2025, held over 40 offers from NCAA Division I programs, including Alabama, Florida, Florida State, Georgia, LSU, Miami, Michigan, Notre Dame, Ohio State, Oklahoma, Ole Miss, South Carolina, Texas A&M, and USC. By the following summer, the list had grown to over 60 offers. Tom Loy of 247Sports wrote that Ghioto was "being heavily pursued by just about every major program in America." He reportedly went on "dozens of college visits".

In August 2025, Ghioto was ranked the No. 9 prospect in the initial Rivals.com 2028 class rankings. In the initial release of the full Rivals 300 rankings in March 2026, he was moved up to No. 7. In May, Ghioto was ranked by ESPN as the No. 10 prospect in the inaugural SC Next 300 rankings for the 2028 class. He entered his junior season as a consensus top-10 recruit in the class.

== Personal life ==
Ghioto has one older sister.
