= Southern Continent =

The Southern Continent may refer to:

- Antarctica, Southernmost Continent.
- Australia, see Down Under.
- South America, southern part of the Americas.
- Africa, from a Eurocentric point of view.
- Terra Australis, a large southern continent thought to exist in ancient and medieval times, up through the Age of Discovery
