= Australian Gridiron League =

- Sport: American football
- Founded: 2012
- No. of teams: 6
- Countries: Australia
- Most recent champion: Western Australian Raiders
- Most titles: Queensland Sundevils (2) Western Australian Raiders (2)
- Website: www.the-agl.com.au

The Australian Gridiron League (AGL) is a gridiron competition that forms the highest level of American football in Australia. The league consists of six state teams from New South Wales, Queensland, Victoria, The Australian Capital Territory, South Australia and Western Australia.

== History ==
The first edition of the competition occurred in March 2012, the inaugural clubs being New South Wales Wolfpack, Queensland Sundevils, Victoria Eagles and Western Australian Raiders.

In the 2013 offseason Gridiron Australia announced that it had suspended operations for the 2013 season and Victoria Eagles, but will go ahead with the 2014 season with the inception of Women’s League and new teams the Australian Capital Territory Monarchs and South Australian Swarm for the male competition with the series to be broadcast live via Ascension Sports.

== AGL Grand Final Results ==
Game	Winner	Score	Loser	Venue	City	Date	Ref
AGL Grand Final I	Western Australian Raiders	42-35	New South Wales Wolfpack		Caringbah, New South Wales	2012	
AGL Grand Final II	Queensland Sundevils	42-14	New South Wales Wolfpack		Runaway Bay, Queensland	2014	
AGL Grand Final III	Queensland Sundevils	17-14	Western Australia Raiders		Wacol, Queensland	2016	
AGL Grand Final IIII	Western Australian Raiders	30-28	Queensland Sundevils		Perth, Western Australia	2018	

== WAGL Grand Final Results ==
Game	Winner	Score	Loser	Venue	City	Date	Ref
WAGL Grand Final I	Queensland Sundevils	14-6	ACT Monarchs			2014	

== See also ==
- Gridiron in Australia
