= Monash Warriors =

Warriors Gridiron Club
Club information
- Full name: Warriors Gridiron Club
- Colours: Cardinal Red & Gold
- Founded: 1985

Current details
- Competition: Gridiron Victoria

The Warriors Gridiron Club' are a gridiron team located in Melbourne, Victoria. They currently field two senior Men's, a Juniors teams and a Women's team in the Gridiron Victoria league.

== History ==
The Nunawading Warriors Gridiron Club was founded in 1985 by the late James White. The Warriors won the minor premiership in 1987, however were eliminated in the finals series with two consecutive losses. The Warriors would have to wait a decade before they returned to the finals series, which happened in 1998 with a semi final loss to the now defunct Banyule Panthers. From this point, the Warriors have been the pre-eminent team in Gridiron Victoria, going on to play finals football every year except 2003 and winning 11 of the 15 Vicbowls they have contested since 2000. With a win in 2010, the Warriors performed a 3-peat of State Championships. They also completed their second 3-Peat after defeating the Buccaneers in 2012, 2013 & 2014.

Our Division 2 Barbarians also were able to win their first Championship in 2013. The Warriors made history by winning both the Division I Vicbowl and Division II Championship in the same season (Currently there are no other clubs with 2 teams).

The Warriors Junior program has also had great success in winning the 2003, 2009, and most recently in 2016 Junior Championship.

=== Notable players ===
Adam Gotsis - Denver Broncos, Jacksonville Jaguars

VIC BOWL CHAMPIONS

Vic Bowl (Year)	Opponent	Final score
XVII (2001)	Croydon Rangers	16-0
XVIII (2002)	Croydon Rangers	19-12
XXI (2005)	Croydon Rangers	18-13
XXII (2006)	Croydon Rangers	12-3
XXIV (2008)	Croydon Rangers	6-0
XXV (2009)	Croydon Rangers	34-16
XXVI (2010)	Geelong Buccaneers	23-14
XXVIII (2012)	Geelong Buccaneers	22-14 (2OT)
XXIX (2013)	Geelong Buccaneers	30-13
XXX (2014)	Geelong Buccaneers	39-14
XXXII (2016)	Western Crusaders	16-12

DIV II CHAMPIONS (BARBARIANS)

DIV II Championship (Year)	Opponent	Final score
III (2013)	Melbourne University Royals	20-6

JUNIOR VIC BOWL CHAMPIONS

Junior Vic Bowl (Year)	Opponent	Final score
VI (2003)	Berwick Miners	20-8
XII (2009)	Croydon Rangers	22-0
XIX (2016)	Melbourne University Lions	42-16

Our Mission Statement:

“The Warriors Gridiron Football Club is a forum for the community to enjoy and gain exposure to the sport of American Football. We play the game with pride, and believe in being excellent in all that we do, from on field performance, socialising and through to the development of our people. We are here to support all of our members and their families.”
