= Gridiron Australia =

Governing body of American football in Australia

American Football Australia
- Sport: Gridiron
- Jurisdiction: Australia
- Abbreviation: AFA
- Founded: 1994(1983)
- Affiliation: International Federation of American Football
- Regional affiliation: Oceania Federation of American Football

Official website
- www.americanfootball.org.au
- (Australia)

American Football Australia is the governing body of American football in Australia. It is an approved sporting association under federal government regulations and is a member of the International Federation of American Football (IFAF). The organisation was formed in 1994 and organized leagues have played since 1983.

American Football Australia oversees the country's national team, which has competed in the IFAF World Cup. It is a governing body of the state-level leagues and does not manage a national-level league itself. Seven out of the eight Australian states and territories run leagues; a total of 70 teams consisting of approximately 3000 players. Only six of the eight state leagues are currently registered under Gridiron Australia. Leagues also provide state-level teams to the American Football Australia National Championships. In 2012, the Australian Gridiron League was established by American Football Australia. The 2026 Champions were the Victorian Eagles.

Organised gridiron has been played in Australia since 1983 and is always referred to as gridiron or American football rather than football to distinguish it from the other football codes such as rugby league, rugby union, Australian rules football or soccer. American Football Australia realigned the playing seasons so that the whole country competes at roughly the same time, to allow state and national teams to select and train players when they all share an off-season. Typically leagues play from September to December, with clubs starting their preseasons in June.

== Australian National Team ==
The Australia national team consists of 92 players chosen from all seven participating states, as well as international players interested in playing overseas. These players represent Australia in international competitions such as the IFAF World Cup, the Oceania Bowl, a Tahiti Football Festival and other national level events.

== IFAF World Cup ==
The 2015 IFAF World Cup was held between 9–18 July and consisted of seven countries (Australia, Brazil, France, Japan, Mexico, South Korea and the USA) playing twelve games at the Tom Benson Hall of Fame Stadium, Ohio.

Australia finished fifth after defeating South Korea 42-14.

The gold medal was awarded to the USA, silver to Japan and bronze to Mexico.

== Tahiti Football Festival ==
The men's Australian Outback National Team travelled to Tahiti to participate in the very first Tahitian Football Festival hosted by Federation Tahitienne Football American (FTFA). The purpose of this trip was to assist Tahiti with developing their own national team. American Samoa were invited to participate in the festival which had the intention of encouraging the growth of gridiron in the Oceania Region.

Australia played two games during the twelve day stay with winning results.

The first game against American Samoa was held on 27 July 2016, which the Australian Outbacks won 40-14.

The second game against Tahiti was played on 30 July 2016 who the Outbacks defeated 82-6.

== Member leagues and teams ==
There are 70 clubs that compete in full contact junior, senior and women's competitions in seven leagues nationwide. Representative teams are formed by players from across the league, not solely from the league's championship team. Gridiron Australia also includes non-contact touch football and flag football competitions and tournaments.

NOTE: (W)= Women's team registered under the same name as Seniors. (J)= Junior's team registered under the same name as Seniors.

- ACT Gridiron - Championship is the Capital Bowl, representative team is the ACT Monarchs
  - Centurions Gridiron (J)
  - University of Canberra Firebirds (J)
  - Woden Valley Gladiators
  - Sirens Gridiron (Women's Team)
  - Central Spears
  - Tuggeranong Tornadoes (Junior's Team)
  - Gungahlin Wildcats (J)
- Gridiron NSW's men's Division 1 championship game is the Waratah Bowl and its representative team is the NSW Coyotes
  - Central Coast Sharks (J) (W)
  - Nepean Ducks (J) (W)
  - Northern Sydney Rebels (J) (W)
  - Central West Giants (J) (W) only
  - Sutherland Seahawks (J)
  - Sydney Uni Lions (W)
  - Sydney Uni Cubs (Junior's Team)
  - UTS Gridiron (J) (W)
  - UNSW Raiders (J) (W)
  - West Sydney Pirates (J)
  - Wollongong Mustangs (J)
  - Hunter Gridiron League
- Gridiron Queensland - Championship is the Sun Bowl, representative team is the Queensland Sundevils
  - Bayside Ravens (J) (W)
  - Brisbane Bears (J)
  - Brisbane Rhinos (J)
  - Brisbane Saints (Women's Team)
  - Cairns Rebels
  - Gold Coast Stingrays (J) (W)
  - Griffith University Thunder (W)
  - Logan City Jets (Women's Team)
  - Moreton Bay Raptors (J) (W)
  - South Brisbane Wildcats
  - Sunshine Coast Spartans (J) (W)
  - Toowoomba Valley Vultures (J)
  - Western Cougars (J)
- South Australian Gridiron Association - Championship is the Great Southern Bowl, representative team is the SA Sharks
  - Adelaide University Razorbacks
  - Port Adelaide Spartans
  - South City Chiefs
  - Southern District Oilers
  - UniSA Eagles
- Gridiron Victoria (not registered under Gridiron Australia)- Championship is the Vic Bowl, representative team is the Victorian Eagles
  - Ballarat Falcons
  - Bendigo Dragons
  - Berwick Miners (J)
  - Berwick Miners Diamonds (Women's Team)
  - Croydon Rangers (J) (W)
  - Geelong Buccaneers (W)
  - Gippsland Gladiators
  - Melbourne Uni Chargers (Women's Team)
  - Melbourne Uni Lions (Junior's Team)
  - Melbourne Uni Royals
  - Melton Wolves (W)
  - Monash Warriors (J)
  - Northern Lady Raiders (Women's Team)
  - Northern Raiders (J)
  - Northern Chargers
  - Pakenham Silverbacks (J) (W)
  - South Eastern Predators (J)
  - Western Crusaders (J)
- Gridiron West - Championship is the Gridiron West Bowl, representative team is the WA Raiders
  - Claremont Jets (J)
  - Curtin Saints (J)
  - Perth Blitz (J)
  - Perth Broncos (Men's, Women's & Under 19's)
  - Rockingham Vipers (J)
  - West Coast Wolverines (W) (J)
  - Vincent City Ducks
  - Westside Steelers (J)
- Gridiron Tasmania - Championship is the Tiger Bowl, representative team is the Tasmanian Tigers
  - Launceston Gorillas
  - Utas Devils
  - Hobart City Knights
  - Northwest Raiders

== See also ==
- Gridiron in Australia
- List of leagues of American football
