= Port Adelaide Spartans =

Spartans
- Full name: Port Adelaide Spartans
- Nickname: Spartans
- Sport: Gridiron (American football)
- Founded: 1985
- First season: 1986
- League: South Australian Gridiron Association
- Home ground: Eric Sutton Reserve
- Colours: Black / Red / White
- President: Pelle de Francesca
- Coaches: Senior Coach Michael Bayne, Junior Coach George Howard
- Club titles: 3 Senior Premierships, 2 Junior Contact Premierships, 1 Flag Football Premiership
- Website: https://www.spartansgridiron.com/

The Port Adelaide Spartans are a gridiron football club competing in the South Australian Gridiron Association league.

== History ==
The Spartans were one of four original clubs to form the Gridiron league of South Australia in 1985. Along with the Razorbacks, Breakers and Longhorns (now Oilers) they competed in the first season of Gridiron in South Australia in 1986. The Spartans played the first ever game of gridiron football in South Australia on 11 January 1986, beating the Longhorns 13 - 0.

The 2000–2001 season saw the Spartans win their most recent flag, capping off a great year for the club, becoming the first club to win Senior, Junior Contact and Flag Football premierships. The Spartans currently hold 3 Senior and 2 Junior Contact premiership flags.

Over many years, the Spartans have forged themselves into one of the dominant teams in the league. Through many years of hard-fought matches, the Spartans have formed a long-term rivalry with their cross-town counterparts, the Razorbacks. This rivalry has seen the majority of league Grand Finals contested between the two clubs.

== See also ==
- South Australian Gridiron Association
