= Adam Gotsis =

Australian American football player (born 1992)

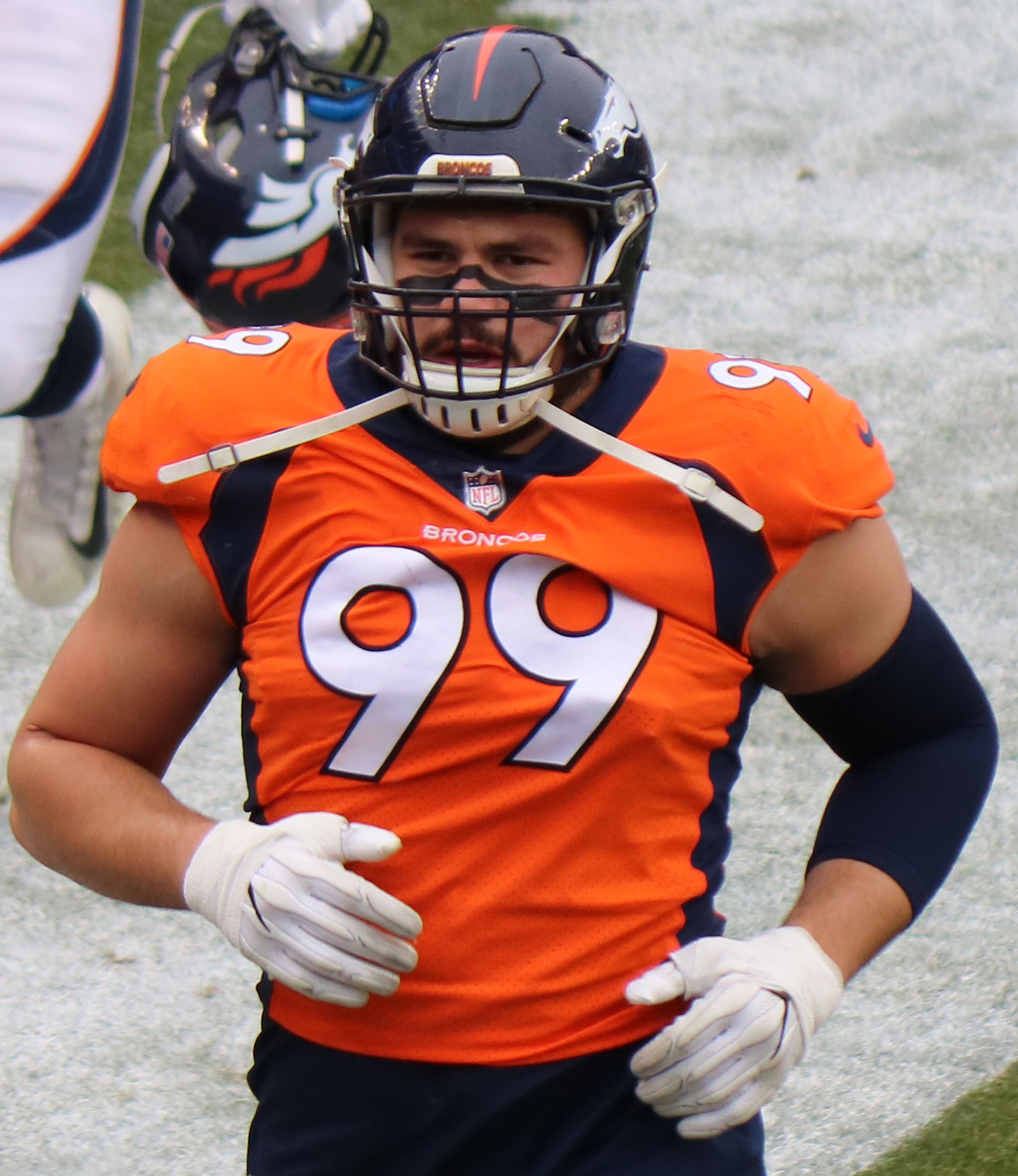
- Gotsis with the Denver Broncos in 2017

Profile
- Position: Defensive end

Personal information
- Born: 23 September 1992 (age 34); Melbourne, Victoria, Australia
- Listed height: 6 ft 4 in (1.93 m)
- Listed weight: 287 lb (130 kg)

Career information
- High school: Kew (Kew East, Victoria)
- College: Georgia Tech (2012–2015)
- NFL draft: 2016: 2nd round, 63rd overall pick

Career history
- Denver Broncos (2016–2019); Jacksonville Jaguars (2020–2023); Indianapolis Colts (2024); Tampa Bay Buccaneers (2024–2025)

Career NFL statistics as of 2025
- Total tackles: 226
- Sacks: 10.5
- Forced fumbles: 3
- Fumble recoveries: 4
- Pass deflections: 22
- Stats at Pro Football Reference

Adam Gotsis (born 23 September 1992) is an Australian professional American football defensive end. He played college football for the Georgia Tech Yellow Jackets and was selected by the Denver Broncos in the second round of the 2016 NFL draft. He also played for the Jacksonville Jaguars and Indianapolis Colts.

== Early life ==
Gotsis was born in Melbourne, Victoria, to parents of Greek heritage, he was raised in the suburb of Abbotsford. He grew up playing Australian rules football and supported the North Melbourne Football Club in the Australian Football League. At the age of 13, while attending Kew High School, his interest in Australian rules football had waned and his mother discovered a local junior American football club via a Google search, the Monash Warriors, that Gotsis and his older brother would later join. He recorded a team-high 12.5 sacks and earned league MVP honors in 2010. He progressed through the local ranks and eventually represented the Australian national American football team at the IFAF World Championship in December 2011. A month later, Gotsis signed to play college football for Georgia Tech and arrived in Atlanta in July 2012.

== College career ==
Gotsis spent four years playing college football for the Georgia Tech Yellow Jackets football team. Gotsis appeared in 48 games (37 starts) at Georgia Tech, totaling 110 tackles (69 solo), 12.5 sacks, two interceptions, two fumble recoveries and four blocked kicks. He started the first nine games of his senior season, finishing the year with 31 tackles (20 solo), five tackles for loss, a team-best three sacks and two fumble recoveries before a season-ending knee injury. Gotsis started all 14 games along the defensive line his junior season, posting 36 tackles (23 solo), three sacks, one interception, three passes defensed and two blocked kicks. He was named to the All-Atlantic Coast Conference Second-team by both the media and coaches. Gotsis started all 13 games of his sophomore season at nose tackle, recording 38 tackles (23 solo), 5.5 sacks, one interception and one pass defensed in addition to blocking two kicks. He ranked second on team in tackles for loss (14.5) and sacks (5.5). He graduated from Georgia Tech with a degree in Business Administration in December 2015.

== Professional career ==
Pre-draft measurables
Height	Weight	Arm length	Hand span	Bench press
6 ft 4 1/2 in (1.94 m)	287 lb (130 kg)	34 1/8 in (0.87 m)	10 3/4 in (0.27 m)	23 reps

=== Denver Broncos ===
Gotsis was selected by the Denver Broncos in the second round (63rd overall) in the 2016 NFL draft. He became the highest-drafted Australian-born player in NFL history. On 26 May 2016, the Broncos announced that they had signed Gotsis to a four-year, $5.40 million contract with a signing bonus of $1.06 million.

Gotsis played all 16 games and finished with 14 tackles (5 solo), one pass defensed and one fumble recovery. Gotsis made his NFL debut vs. the Carolina Panthers on 8 September 2016.

In 2017, Gotsis started 13-of-16 games played, totaling 41 tackles (28 solo), two sacks, four passes defensed and one fumble recovery. He earned his first NFL start and made four tackles (2 solo) vs. the Dallas Cowboys on 17 September 2017. Gotsis recorded his first career sack and blocked a field goal vs. the New York Giants on 15 October 2017.

On 23 December 2019, Gotsis was placed on injured reserve after undergoing knee surgery.

=== Jacksonville Jaguars ===
On 2 August 2020, Gotsis signed with the Jacksonville Jaguars.

Gotsis re-signed with the Jaguars on 25 March 2021. He played in 16 games with four starts, recording three sacks and 27 tackles.

On 4 May 2022, Gotsis re-signed with the Jaguars.

On 20 March 2023, Gotsis again re–signed with Jacksonville. He appeared in all 17 games for Jacksonville in 2023, logging 26 combined tackles, 4 pass deflections, and 1 sack.

Gotsis was waived by the Jaguars on August 6, 2024.

=== Indianapolis Colts ===
On September 17, 2024, Gotsis signed with the Indianapolis Colts practice squad. Later in the 2024 season, Gotsis was elevated for a Week 4 game against the Pittsburgh Steelers. He was released on November 16.

=== Tampa Bay Buccaneers ===
On January 8, 2025, Gotsis was signed to the Tampa Bay Buccaneers practice squad. He signed a reserve/future contract on January 21. He was released on August 26 as part of final roster cuts and re-signed to the practice squad the next day. During Week 1, Gotsis was elevated to the active roster.

== Controversy ==
In March 2018, Gotsis was arrested for alleged rape of a woman in 2013, while he was a student-athlete at Georgia Tech. He surrendered himself to Atlanta Police on 7 March 2018, and was released after posting $US 50,000. On 15 August 2018, the Fulton County District Attorney’s Office announced that it would not pursue charges against Gotsis.
