= Gridiron Victoria =

Governing body for American football in Victoria, Australia

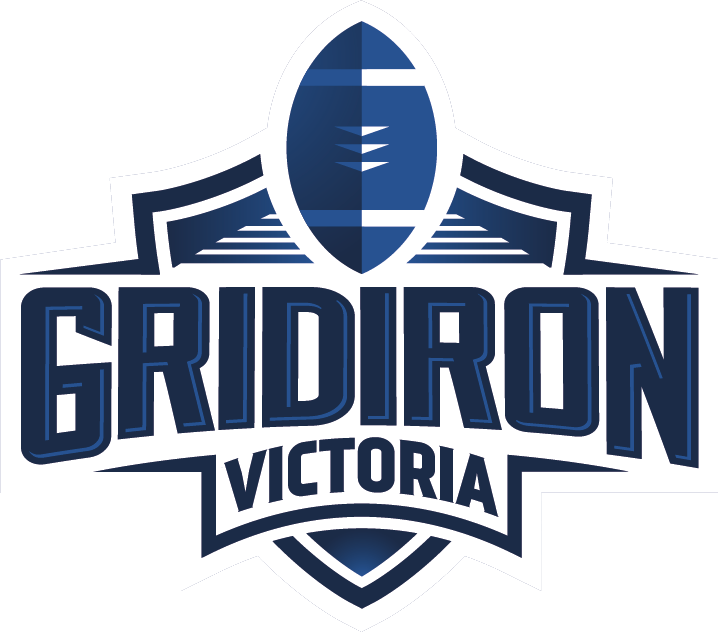
- Sport: Gridiron
- Founded: 1997
- Motto: "Bigger and Better"
- No. of teams: 13
- Country: Australia
- Most recent champions: (Men's Senior Division One) Western Crusaders (Women's) Norther Raiders (Men's Senior Division Two) Northern Chargers (Under 18s) Croydon Rangers
- Website: gridironvictoria.com.au

Gridiron Victoria is the governing body for American football in the state of Victoria, Australia.

Formed in 1997, Gridiron Victoria was an amalgamation of the two existing governing bodies of the time, the Victoria Gridiron Football League and the Gridiron Association of Victoria.

In 2025, the name was changed to briefly changed to American Football Victoria to incorporate both tackle and flag football into one governing body, but was reverted back a few months later. This brought American Football Victoria in line with American Football Australia (Formerly Gridiron Australia), as well as the other state leagues in the country.

== Vic Bowl ==
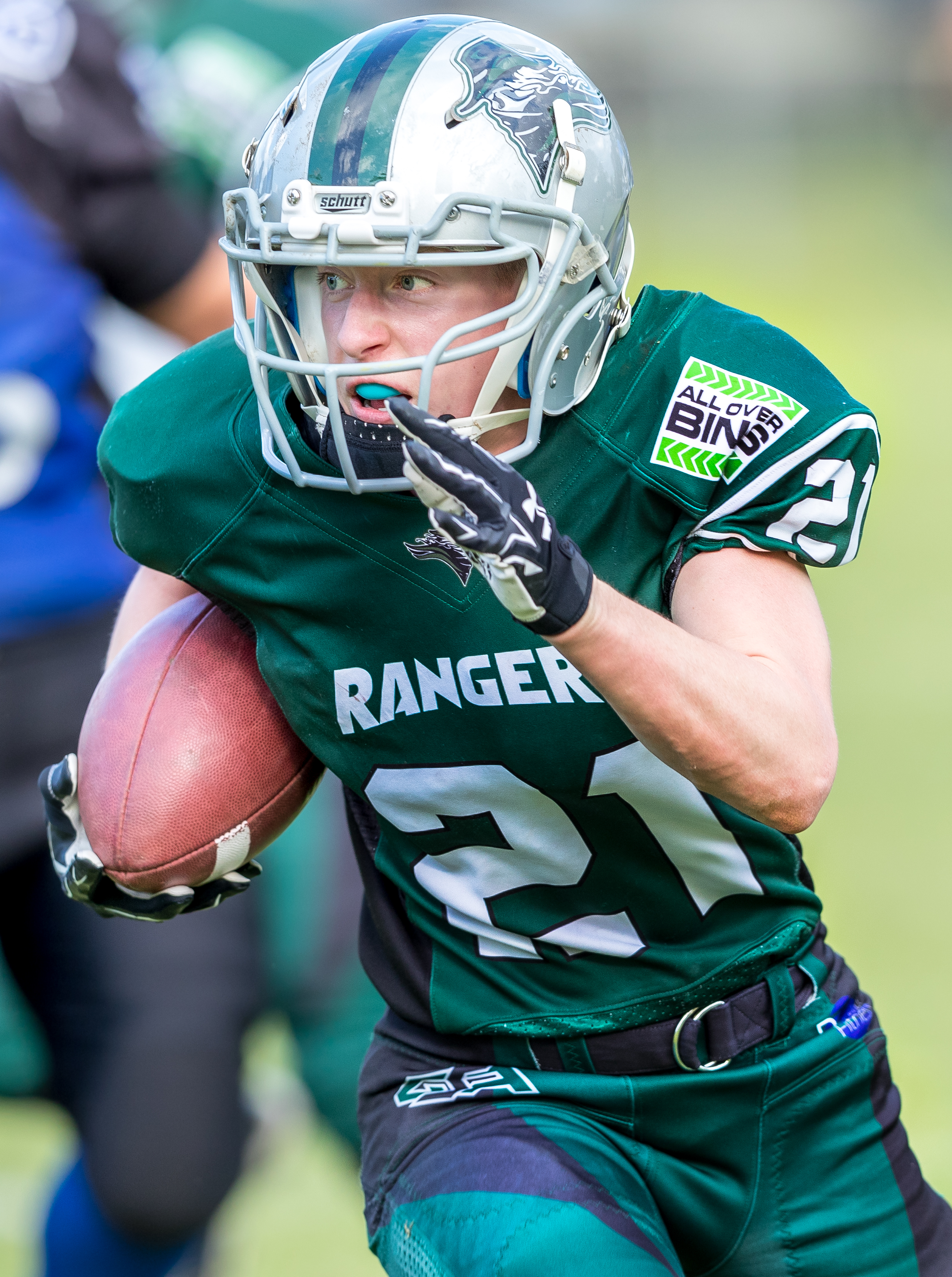
Tanya Russell of the Croydon Rangers in the 2017 Women's Vic Bowl, in which she won the MVP award

The Vic Bowl is the Championship Game played between the two best teams in the men's Division One competition throughout the American Football Victoria season, whilst the best teams in the men's second division compete for the Division Two Championship.

The Junior Championship game is known as the Junior Vic Bowl, whilst the Women's Championship game is known as the Women's Vic Bowl.

The Warriors Girdiron Club are the most decorated Division One club with 11 Vic Bowls, their most recent in 2016 with a 16 - 12 win over the Western Crusaders.

The Pakenham Silverbacks have won the most Division Two Championships with 2, their most recent in 2016 with a 43 - 8 victory over the Northern Raiders.

The Croydon Rangers are the most successful Junior team with 8 titles, their most recent in 2024 with a 28 - 20 win over the Southern Vikings.

In the Women's division, the Western Crusaders and Geelong Buccaneers have both won 2 Women's Vic Bowls each.

== Clubs ==
The following is a list of current and former teams competing in American Football Victoria.

=== Men's teams ===
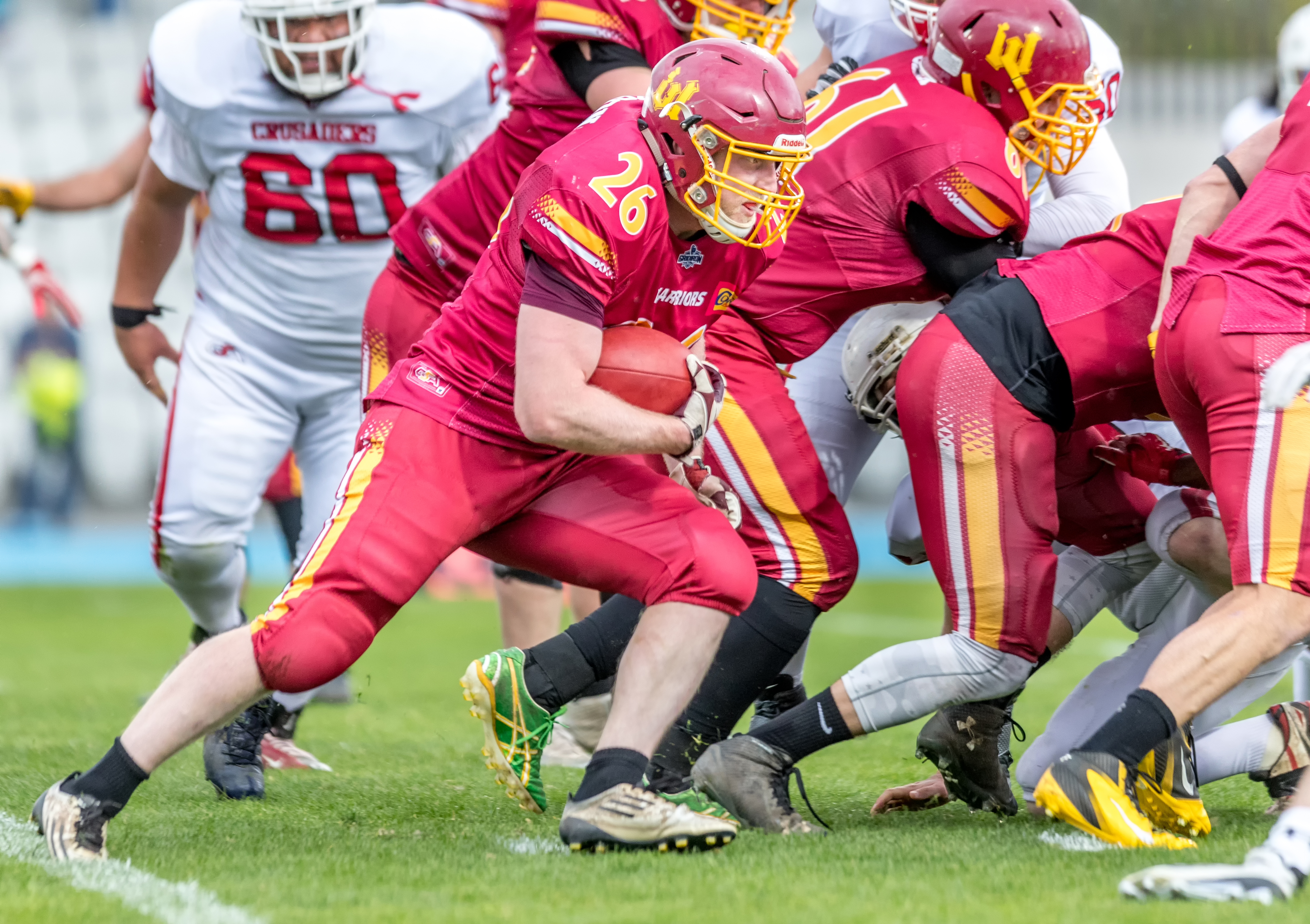
The 2016 men's Vic Bowl between Western Crusaders and Monash Warriors

- Bendigo Dragons based at Bendigo
- Croydon Rangers based at Croydon
- Geelong Buccaneers based at Corio
- Melton Wolves based at Melton
- South Eastern Predators based at Cheltenham
- Southern Vikings based at Hampton Park / Endeavour Hills
- Warriors Gridiron Club based in Mulgrave
- Western Crusaders based at Footscray
- Northern Chargers based at Broadmeadows

=== Former women's teams ===
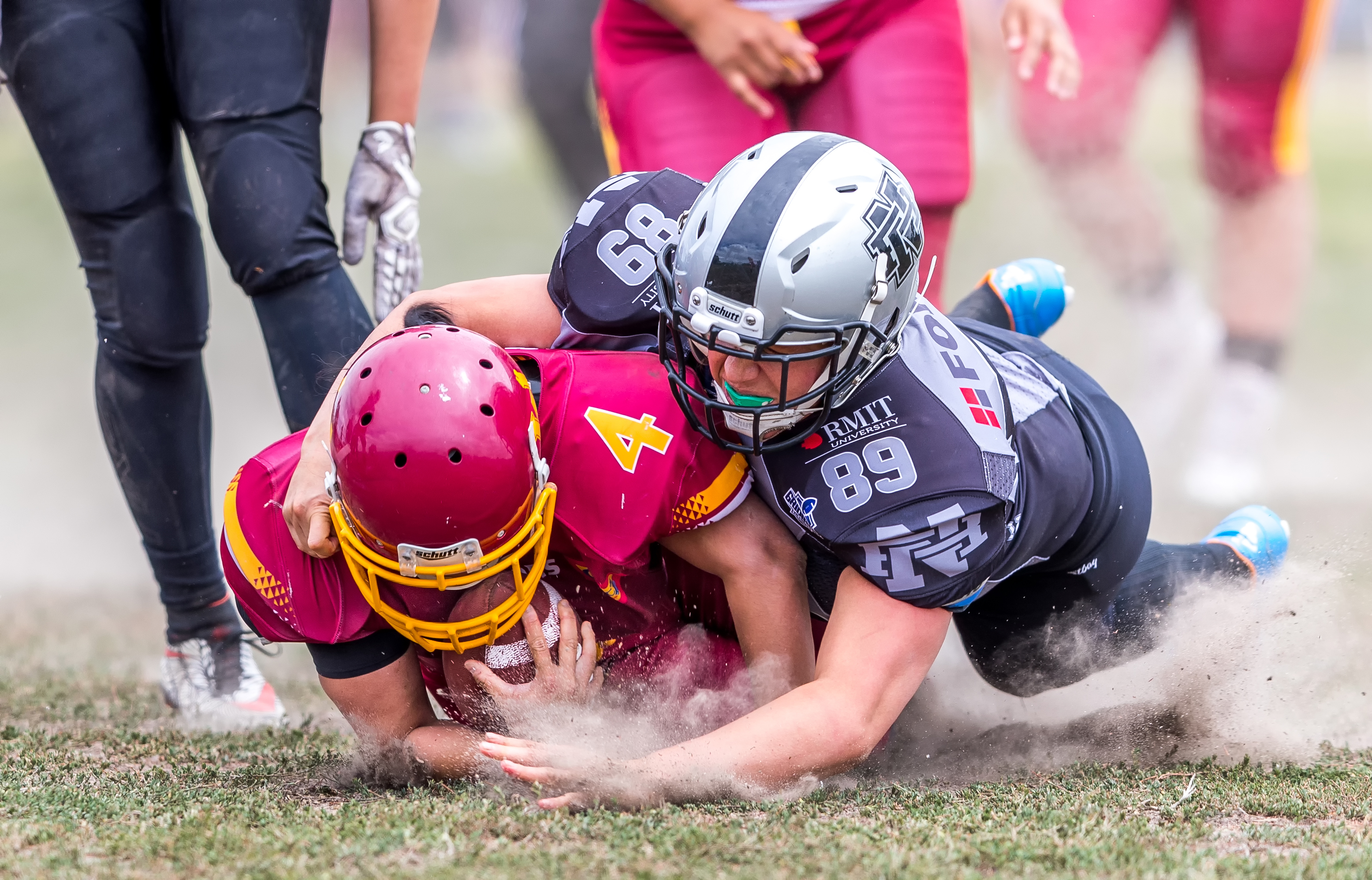
A game between the Northern Lady Raiders and Lady Monash Warriors in 2018

- Ballarat Kestrels based at Ballarat
- Berwick Miners Diamonds based at Endeavour Hills
- Croydon Rangers based at Croydon
- Geelong Buccaneers based at Geelong
- Melbourne Uni Chargers based at Parkville
- Melton Wolves based at Melton
- Monash Warriors based at Mulgrave
- Northern Lady Raiders based at Reservoir
- Pakenham Silverbacks based at Pakenham
- Western Foxes based at Footscray

=== Former men's teams ===
- Ballarat Falcons based at Ballarat
- Ballarat Pioneers based at Ballarat
- Banyule Panthers based at Greensborough
- Bendigo Dragons: 1992-2002 Bendigo
- Berwick Miners based at Endeavour Hills
- Brighton Outlaws based at Brighton
- Broadmeadows Cowboys based at Broadmeadows
- Casey Spartans based at Dandenong
- Dallas Cowboys based in Dallas
- Doncaster Devils based at Doncaster
- Frankston Sweathogs based at Frankston
- Gippsland Gladiators based at Morwell
- Geelong Wildcats based at Geelong
- Hawthorn Hurricanes based in Hawthorn
- Kew Colts based at Kew
- Lilydale Steelers based at Lilydale
- Melbourne Hornets based at Fitzroy
- Melbourne University Royals based at Parkville
- Moorabbin Raiders based at Oakleigh
- Northern Blackhawks based at Fawkner
- Northern Raiders based at Reservoir
- Pakenham Silverbacks based at Pakenham
- Peninsula Razorbacks based in Mornington
- Peninsula Sharks based at Carrum Downs
- Southern Bulls based at Hampton
- Southern Seahawks based at Frankston
- South Eastern Predators based at Cheltenham
- South Yarra Rams based at South Yarra
- Subway Stealers
- Templestowe Thunder based at Templestowe
- Valley Pirates based at Greensborough
- Waverley Sharks based at Waverley
- Westside Vikings based at Altona

== Image gallery ==
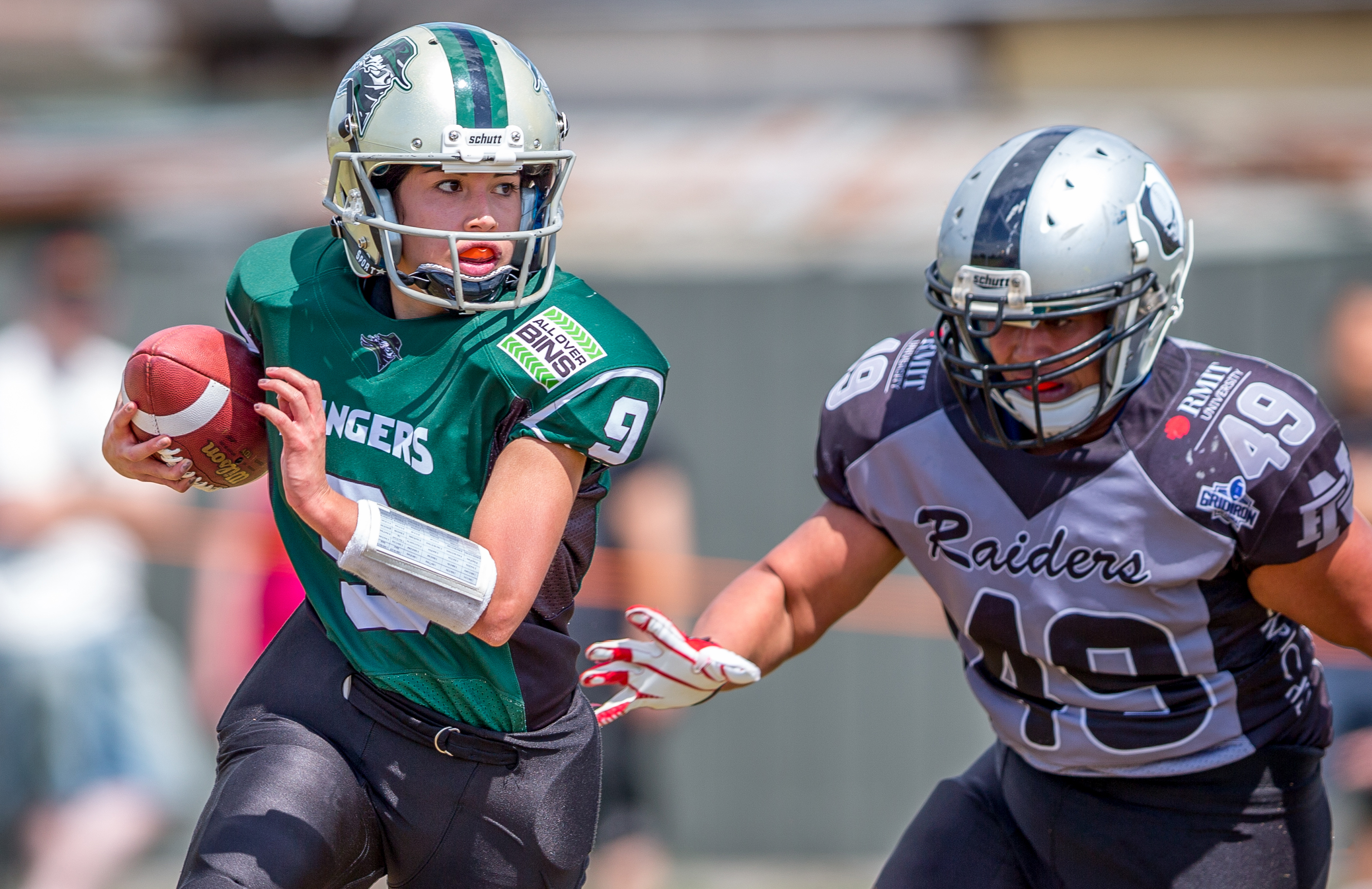

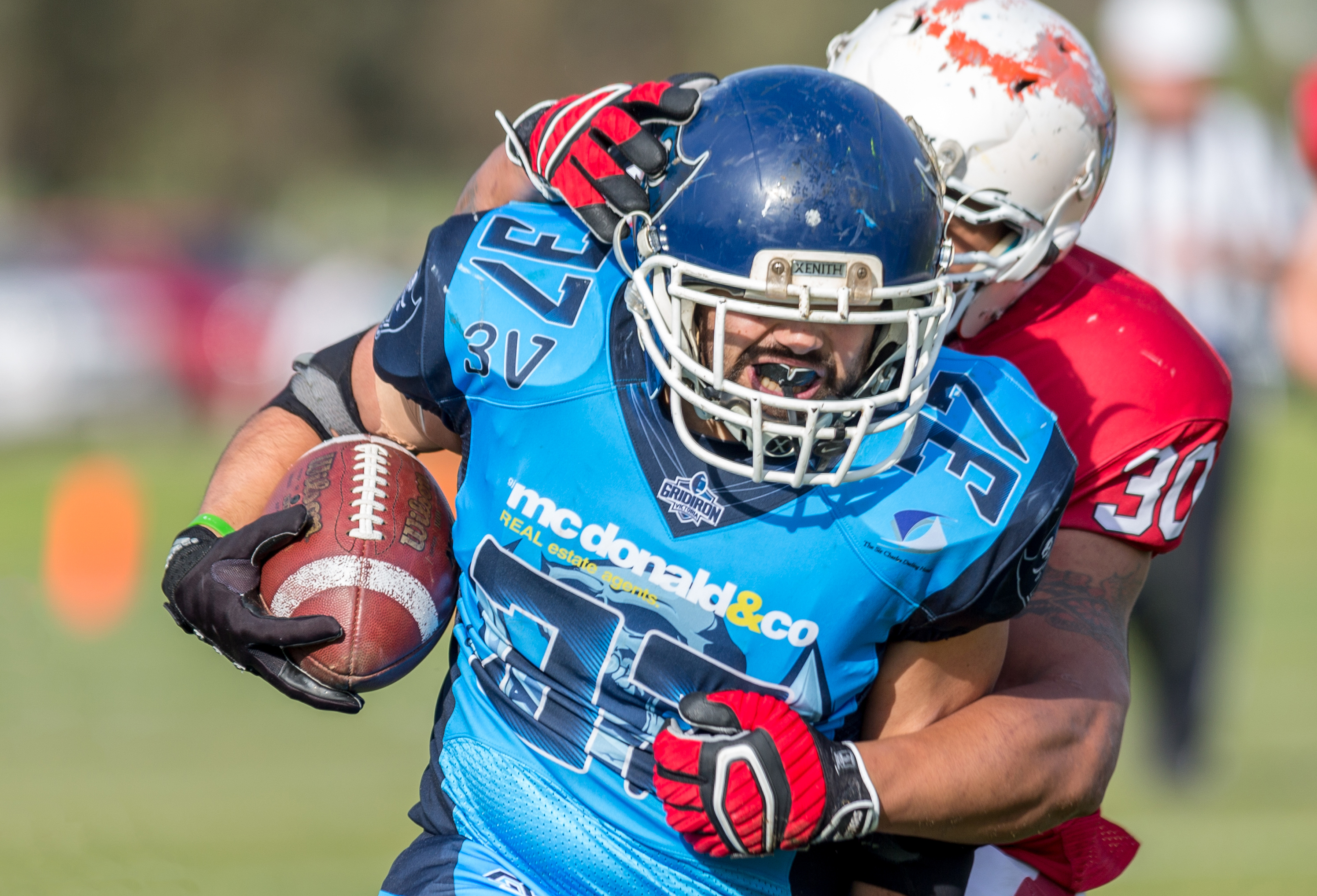

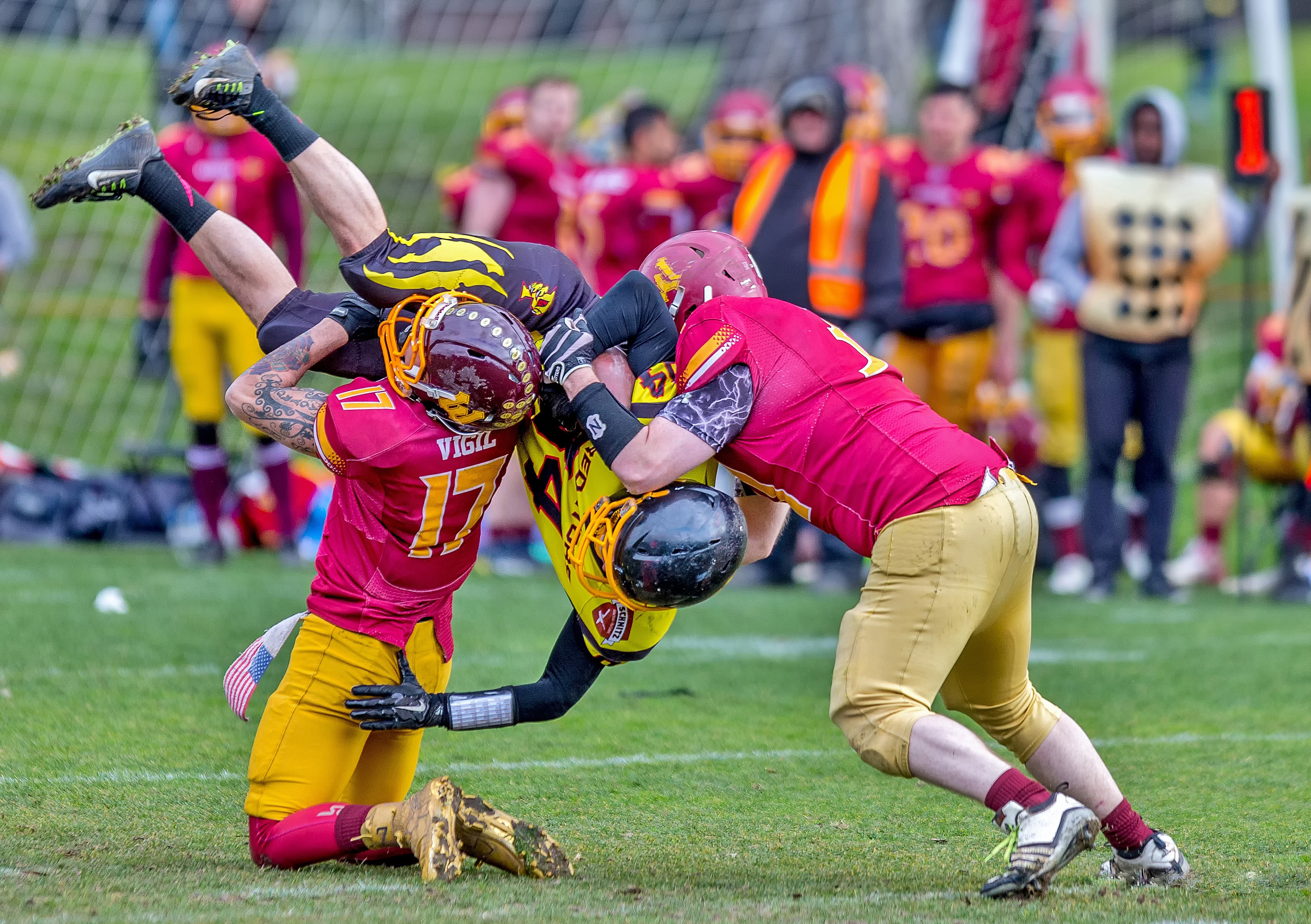

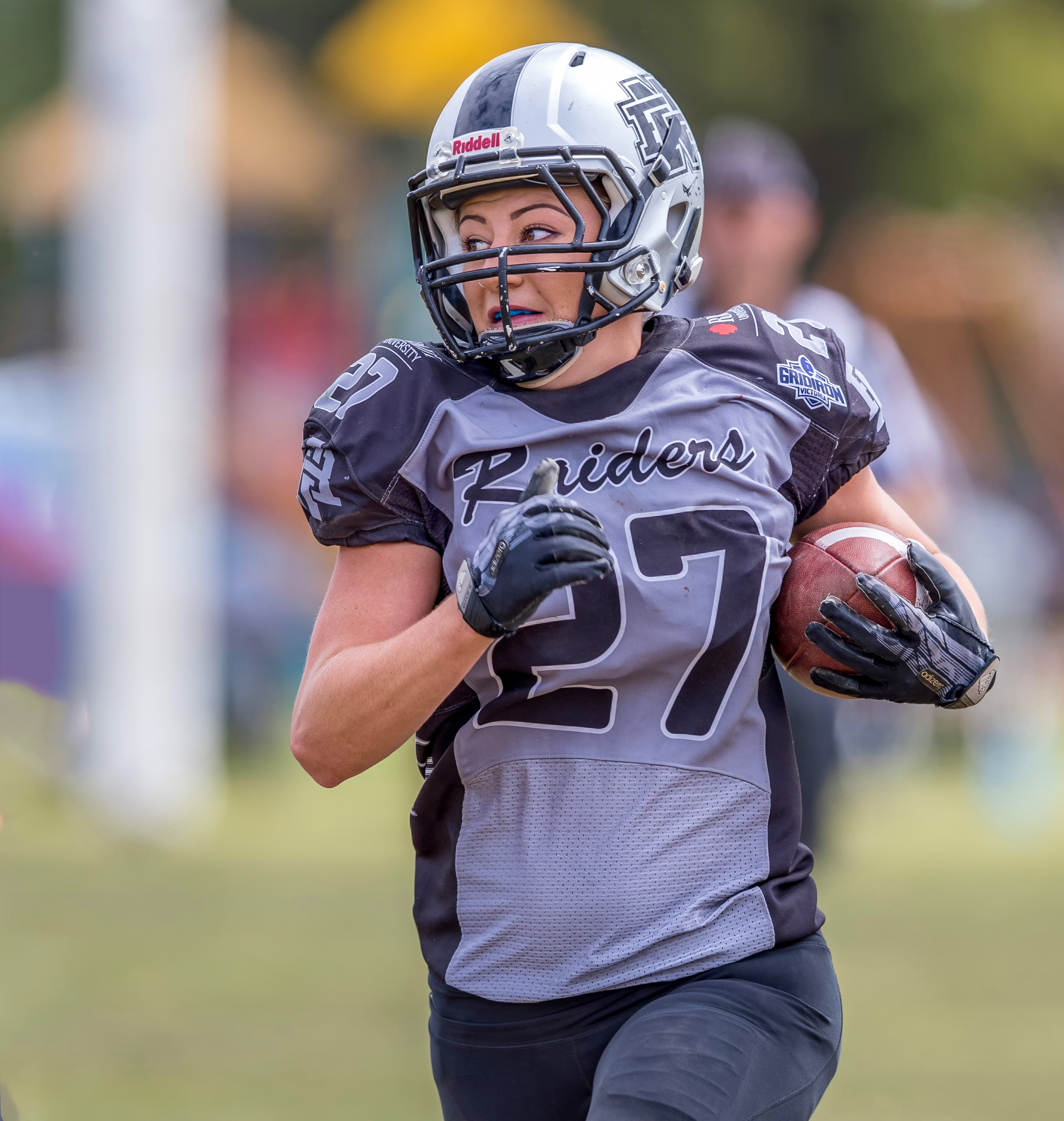

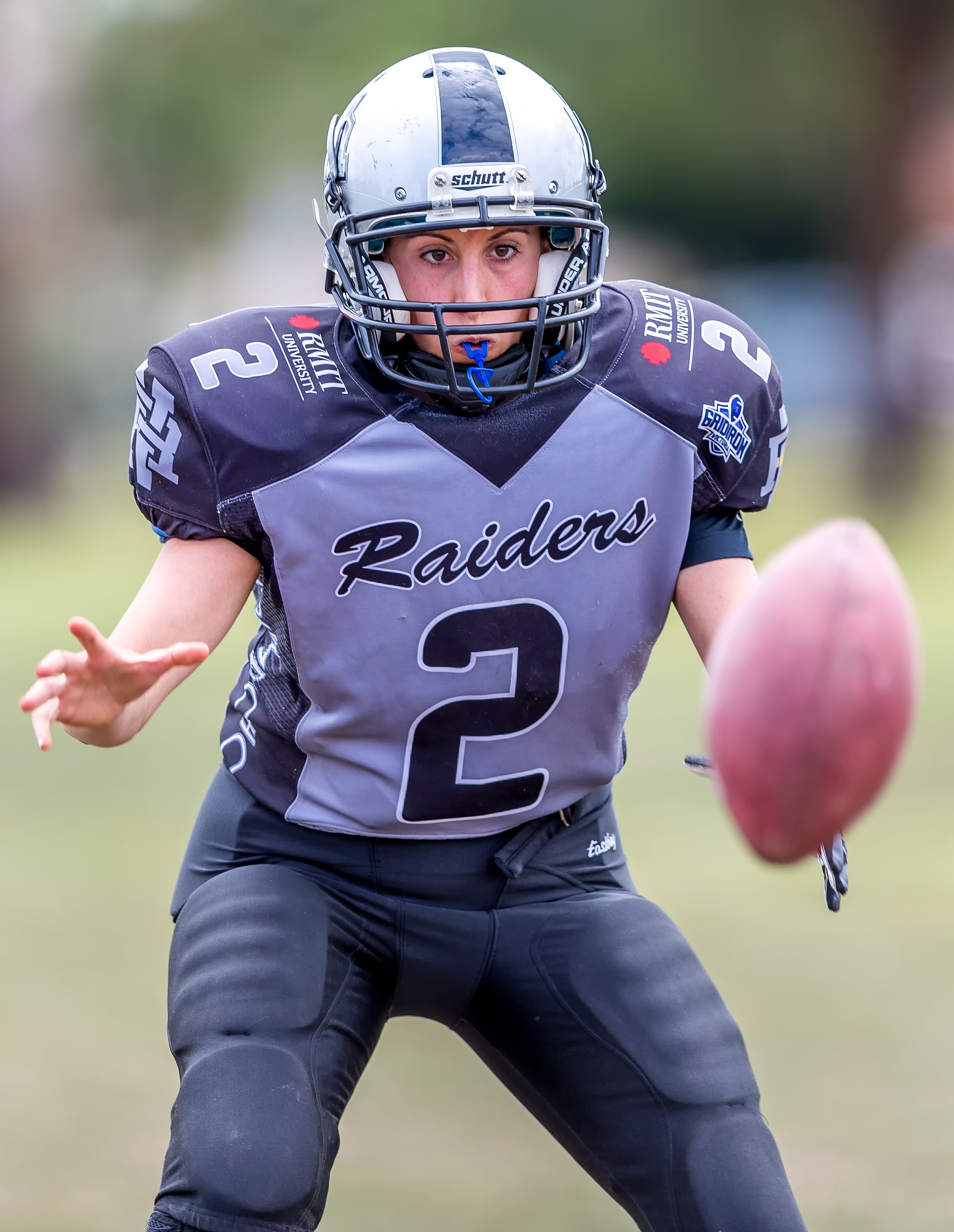

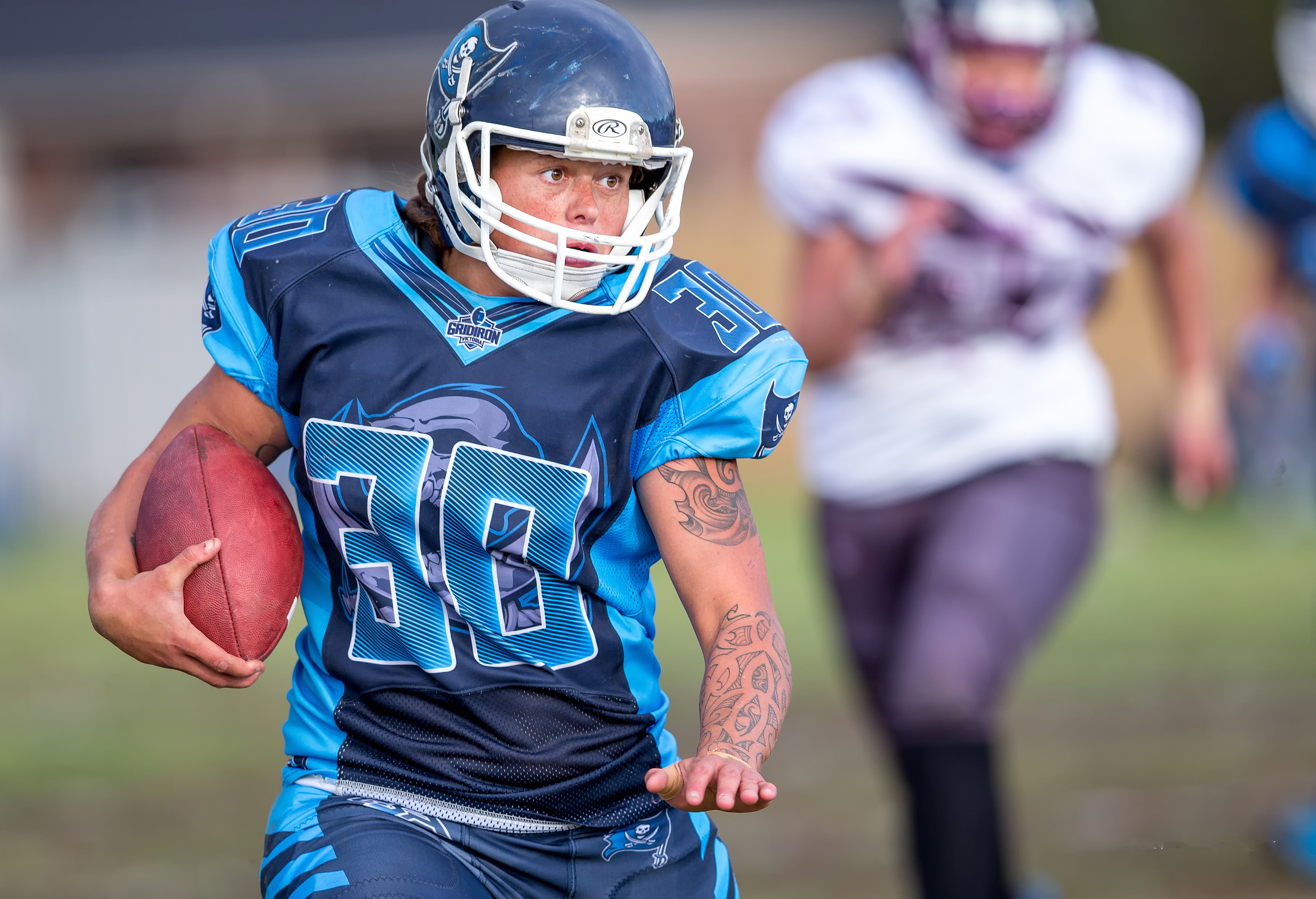

== Championship Games ==
=== Men's Senior Division 1 ===
Mens Division 1 Vic Bowl Tally
Team	Wins	Losses	Appearances
Monash/Warriors Gridiron	11	6	17
Western Crusaders	11	1	12
Croydon Rangers	4	13	17
Brighton Outlaws	4	0	4
Berwick Miners	3	3	6
Doncaster Devils	2	0	2
Kew Colts	2	0	2
Geelong/Bay City Buccaneers	1	5	6
Waverley Sharks	1	1	2
Moorabbin Raiders	1	0	1
Melbourne Hornets	0	3	3
Frankston Sweathogs	0	2	2
Banyule Panthers	0	2	2
Westside Vikings	0	1	1
Melbourne Uni Royals	0	1	1
South Eastern Predators	0	1	1

Vic Bowl history, in the Victorian Gridiron Football League, Gridiron Victoria, and American Football Victoria Division One:

Vicbowl	Year	Winning team	Score	Losing team	Score	Venue
I	1985	Outlaws	12	Rangers	0	Olympic Park Stadium, Melbourne
II	1986	Outlaws	26	Hornets	6	Olympic Park Stadium, Melbourne
III	1987	Outlaws	26	Hornets	19	Olympic Park Stadium, Melbourne
IV	1988	Outlaws	20	Hornets	17	Olympic Park Stadium, Melbourne
V	1989	Devils	13	Sweathogs	8	Olympic Park Stadium, Melbourne
VI	1990	Devils	62	Sweathogs	26	Olympic Park Stadium, Melbourne
VII	1991	Miners	45	Vikings	8	Olympic Park Stadium, Melbourne
VIII	1992	Colts	26	Miners	20	Olympic Park Stadium, Melbourne
IX	1993	Colts	24	Miners	7	Olympic Park Stadium, Melbourne
X	1994	Miners	20	Sharks	14	St Kilda Football Club Reserve, Linton Street, Moorabbin
XI	1995	Sharks	27	Miners	23	St Kilda Football Club Reserve, Linton Street, Moorabbin
XII	1996	Raiders	20	Rangers	6	Sparks Reserve, Box Hill
XIII	1997	Rangers	18	Panthers	5	Sydney Pargeter Reserve, Endeavour Hills
XIV	1998	Rangers	28	Panthers	21	Sydney Pargeter Reserve, Endeavour Hills
XV	1999	Crusaders	20*	Rangers	14*	Sydney Pargeter Reserve, Endeavour Hills
XVI	2000	Crusaders	14	Warriors	0	Footscray Hockey Centre, Yarraville
XVII	2001	Warriors	16	Rangers	0	Footscray Hockey Centre, Yarraville
XVIII	2002	Warriors	19	Rangers	12	Sydney Pargeter Reserve, Endeavour Hills
XIX	2003	Miners	38	Rangers	28	Springfield Reserve, Croydon
XX	2004	Rangers	19	Warriors	0	Springfield Reserve, Croydon
XXI	2005	Warriors	18	Rangers	13	Tony Dodemaide Reserve, Footscray
XXII	2006	Warriors	12	Rangers	3	Sydney Pargeter Reserve, Endeavour Hills
XXIII	2007	Crusaders	21	Warriors	13	Sydney Pargeter Reserve, Endeavour Hills
XXIV	2008	Warriors	6	Rangers	0	Sydney Pargeter Reserve, Endeavour Hills
XXV	2009	Warriors	36	Rangers	12	Sydney Pargeter Reserve, Endeavour Hills
XXVI	2010	Warriors	23	Buccaneers	14	Springfield Reserve, Croydon
XXVII	2011	Buccaneers	34	Rangers	14	LE Cotchin Reserve, Reservoir
XXVIII	2012	Warriors	22 +	Buccaneers	14	Moorabbin Oval, Linton St, Moorabbin
XXIX	2013	Warriors	30	Buccaneers	13	Moorabbin Oval, Linton St, Moorabbin
XXX	2014	Warriors	39	Buccaneers	14	Tom Flood Sports Centre, Bendigo
XXXI	2015	Rangers	16	Warriors	7	Latrobe City Stadium, Morwell
XXXII	2016	Warriors	16	Crusaders	12	Lakeside Stadium, Albert Park
XXXIII	2017	Crusaders	30	Royals	9	MacPherson Park Recreation Reserve, Melton
XXXIV	2018	Crusaders	36	Warriors	6	Hendy Street Reserve, Corio
XXXV	2019	Crusaders	38	Warriors	6	Casey Fields, Casey
XXXVI	2022^{1}	Crusaders	44	Rangers	0	Springfield Reserve, Croydon
XXXVII	2022^{2}	Crusaders	42	Rangers	12	Springfield Reserve, Croydon
XXXVIII	2023	Crusaders	50	Predators	16	Henry Turner Reserve, Footscray
XXXIX	2024	Crusaders	20	Buccaneers	14	Henry Turner Reserve, Footscray
XL	2025	Crusaders	21	Buccaneers	6	MacPherson Park, Melton

- Vicbowl XV was decided in Overtime (5 periods)
- Vicbowl XXVIII was decided in Overtime (2 periods)

Note: The 2021 season was delayed due to COVID-19 lock downs in Victoria and was conducted in Summer/Autumn 2022, before the regularly scheduled Spring/Summer season in 2022.

=== Women's Vic Bowl ===
Year	Winning team	Score	Losing team	Score	Venue
2013	Western Crusaders	32	Northern Lady Raiders	8	Springfield Reserve, Croydon
2014	Western Crusaders	42	Northern Lady Raiders	34	Sydney Pargeter Reserve, Endeavour Hills
2015	Geelong Buccaneers	20	Northern Lady Raiders	12	MacPherson Park Recreation Reserve, Melton
2016	Geelong Buccaneers	38	Melbourne Uni Chargers	24	Heatherbrae Reserve, Officer
2017	Croydon Rangers	12	Melbourne Uni Chargers	7	Ranger Field, Croydon
2018	Western Crusaders	12	Croydon Rangers	0	Ranger Field, Croydon
2019	Northern Raiders	54	Western Crusaders	26	Casey Fields, Casey

=== Men's Senior Division Two ===
Championship games:

Year	Winning team	Score	Losing team	Score	Venue
2011	Raiders	18	Gladiators	6	LE Cotchin Reserve, Reservoir
2012	Royals	16	Barbarians	6	Moorabbin Oval, Linton St, Moorabbin
2013	Barbarians	20	Royals	6	Moorabbin Oval, Linton St, Moorabbin
2014	Gladiators	12	Falcons	0	Tom Flood Sports Centre, Bendigo
2015	Silverbacks	9	Barbarians	6	Latrobe City Stadium, Morwell
2016	Silverbacks	43	Raiders	8	Lakeside Stadium, Albert Park
2017	Raiders	10	Wolves	0	MacPherson Park Recreation Reserve, Melton
2022	Crusaders 2	38	Raiders	0	Springfield Reserve, Croydon
2024	Vikings	30	Dragons	0	Henry Turner Reserve, Footscray
2025	Chargers	24	Dragons	6	MacPherson Park Recreation Reserve, Melton

The Division Two season was incorporated into Division One from 2018 to 2021.
As of 2022, Division 2 has been re-established, with the Western Crusaders 2 taking the title.
There was no Division 2 champion awarded in 2023 due to the finals structure.

=== Under 19's Vic Bowl ===
Under 19's Vic Bowl Tally
Team	Wins	Losses	Appearances
Croydon Rangers	9	8	17
Geelong Buccaneers	4	4	8
Berwick Miners	4	3	7
Monash/Warriors Gridiron	3	5	8
Melbourne Uni Royals/Lions	3	1	4
South Eastern Predators	2	1	3
Western Crusaders	1	3	4
Northern Blackhawks	1	0	1
Geelong Wildcats	0	1	1
Banyule Panthers	0	1	1
Southern Vikings	0	1	1

Note: including history in Victorian Gridiron Football League and Gridiron Victoria:

Year	Winning team	Score	Losing team	Score	Venue
1996	Cowboys (VGFL Juniors)	xx	xx	xx	xx
1997	Wolfpack	18	Rangers	0	Springfield Reserve, Croydon
1998	Miners	18	Rangers	14	Sydney Pargeter Reserve, Endeavour Hills
1999	Rangers	28	Panthers	0	Springfield Reserve, Croydon
2000	Rangers	28	Miners	6	Sydney Pargeter Reserve, Endeavour Hills
2001	Miners	28	Wildcats	0	Sydney Pargeter Reserve, Endeavour Hills
2002	Miners	20	Warriors	12	Sydney Pargeter Reserve, Endeavour Hills
2003*	Blackhawks	44	Rangers	8	Sydney Pargeter Reserve, Endeavour Hills
2003**	Warriors	20	Miners	8	Springfield Reserve, Croydon
2004	Rangers	28	Buccaneers	24	Springfield Reserve, Croydon
2005	Rangers	26	Buccaneers	8	Springfield Reserve, Croydon
2006	Buccaneers	16	Miners	6	Deakin University, Waurn Ponds (Geelong)
2007	Miners	42	Buccaneers	22	Sydney Pargeter Reserve, Endeavour Hills
2008	Buccaneers	36	Rangers	16	Springfield Reserve, Croydon
2009	Warriors	22	Rangers	0	Springfield Reserve, Croydon
2010	Rangers	32	Warriors	14	Springfield Reserve, Croydon
2011	Buccaneers	16	Rangers	14	Springfield Reserve, Croydon
2012	Rangers	34	Warriors	0	Springfield Reserve, Croydon
2013	Crusaders	38	Warriors	0	Springfield Reserve, Croydon
2014	Lions	25	Predators	18	Sydney Pargeter Reserve, Endeavour Hills
2015	Lions	28	Crusaders	15	MacPherson Park Recreation Reserve, Melton
2016	Warriors	42	Lions	6	Heatherbrae Reserve, Officer
2017	Predators	46	Crusaders	21	Springfield Reserve, Croydon
2018	Royals	38	Warriors	36	Springfield Reserve, Croydon
2019	COVID-19	--	No Season	--	
2022	Buccaneers	28	Rangers	12	Springfield Reserve, Croydon
2022	Rangers	44	Buccaneers	18	Springfield Reserve, Croydon
2023	Predators	26	Rangers	14	Henry Turner Reserve, Footscray
2024	Rangers	28	Vikings	20	Henry Turner Reserve, Footscray
2025	Rangers	26	Crusaders	22	MacPherson Park Recreation Reserve, Melton

(* Autumn season of 2003) (** Spring season of 2003 : Two seasons were played in 2003 to re-align the senior season)

== Gridiron Victoria Senior Mens State team results ==
Opponent	Played	Wins	Losses	Percentage
NSW Wolfpack	11	5	7	0.45
QLD Sundevils	9	5	4	0.55
SA Sharks/Fire	11	9	2	0.82
ACT Monarchs	7	6	1	0.85
WA Raiders	6	3	3	0.50
NT Redbacks	1	1	0	1.00

Year	Event	Winning team	Score	Losing team	Score	Venue
2026	2026 Australian Nationals Championship Game	Victorian Eagles - Winners (gold)	14	QLD Sundevils	10	Langlands Park, Stones Corner, QLD
2026	2026 Australian Nationals Game 2	Victorian Eagles	33	NSW Wolfpack	0	Hendy St Reserve, Corio, VIC
2026	2026 Australian Nationals Game 1	Victorian Eagles	83	ACT Monarchs	0	Griffith Playing Fields, Griffith, ACT

Year	Event	Winning team	Score	Losing team	Score	Venue
2024	2024 Australian Nationals Game 3	Victorian Eagles	20	SA Sharks	13	Sydney Pargeter Reserve, Endeavour Hills, VIC
2024	2024 Australian Nationals Game 2	QLD Sundevils	28	Victorian Eagles	18	Wyndham Regional Football Facility, Tarneit, VIC
2024	2024 Australian Nationals Game 1	Victorian Eagles	20	ACT Monarchs	0	Tom Flood Sports Centre, Bendigo, VIC

Year	Event	Winning team	Score	Losing team	Score	Venue
2022	2022 Border Battle II	Victorian Eagles	18	SA Sharks	12	Victoria Park, Adelaide, SA

Year	Event	Winning team	Score	Losing team	Score	Venue
2021	2021 Border Battle I	Victorian Eagles	16	SA Sharks	8	Karen Rolton Oval, Adelaide, SA

Year	Event	Winning team	Score	Losing team	Score	Venue
2018	2018 Australian Gridiron League Game 3	WA Raiders	30	Victorian Eagles	22	Curtin University Oval, Bentley, WA
2018	2018 Australian Gridiron League Game 2	QLD Sundevils	34	Victorian Eagles	18	Langlands Park, Stones Corner, QLD
2018	2018 Australian Gridiron League Game 1	Victorian Eagles	46	SA Sharks	0	Henry Turner Reserve, Footscray, VIC

Year	Event	Winning team	Score	Losing team	Score	Venue
2012	2012 Australian Gridiron League Game 3	QLD Sundevils	27	Victorian Eagles	14	Super Sports Centre, Runaway Bay, QLD
2012	2012 Australian Gridiron League Game 2	NSW Wolfpack	52	Victorian Eagles	22	Sydney Academy of Sport, Narrabeen, NSW
2012	2012 Australian Gridiron League Game 1	WA Raiders	16	Victorian Eagles	0	State Netball Hockey Centre, Melbourne, VIC

Year	Event	Winning team	Score	Losing team	Score	Venue
2010	2010 Senior National Championship Game	NSW Wolfpack	28	Victorian Eagles	7	State Netball Hockey Centre, Parkville, VIC
2010	2010 Senior National Championships Game 2	Victorian Eagles	33	QLD Sundevils	6	State Netball Hockey Centre, Parkville, VIC
2010	2010 Senior National Championships Game 1	Victorian Eagles	40	ACT Monarchs	0	State Netball Hockey Centre, Parkville, VIC

Year	Event	Winning team	Score	Losing team	Score	Venue
2008	2008 Senior National Championship Game	NSW Wolfpack	17 OT	Victorian Eagles	16	Super Sports Centre, Runaway Bay, QLD
2008	2008 Senior Nationals Game 3	Victorian Eagles	28	WA Raiders	0	Super Sports Centre, Runaway Bay, QLD
2008	2008 Senior Nationals Game 2	Victorian Eagles	??	QLD Sundevils	??	Super Sports Centre, Runaway Bay, QLD
2008	2008 Senior Nationals Game 1	Victorian Eagles	37	NSW Wolfpack	7	Super Sports Centre, Runaway Bay, QLD

Year	Event	Winning team	Score	Losing team	Score	Venue
2006	2006 National Championship Game	NSW Wolfpack	22	Victorian Eagles	16	Pines Stadium, Adelaide, SA
2006	2006 National Championships Game 2	Victorian Eagles	44	SA Fire	0	Pines Stadium, Adelaide, SA
2006	2006 National Championships Game 1	Victorian Eagles	34	WA Raiders	8	Pines Stadium, Adelaide, SA

Year	Event	Winning team	Score	Losing team	Score	Venue
2005	2005 National Championship Game	NSW Wolfpack	14	Victorian Eagles	13	Pines Stadium, Adelaide, SA
2005	2005 National Championships Game 2	Victorian Eagles	62	QLD	0	Pines Stadium, Adelaide, SA
2005	2005 National Championships Game 1	Victorian Eagles	14	NSW Wolfpack	0	Pines Stadium, Adelaide, SA

Year	Event	Winning team	Score	Losing team	Score	Venue
2005	Downunder Bowl	Kentucky/Virginia	33	Victorian Eagles	0	Carrara, QLD
2005	Downunder Bowl	Minnesota/Dakota	28	Victorian Eagles	0	Carrara, QLD

Year	Event	Winning team	Score	Losing team	Score	Venue
2004	Downunder Bowl	Victorian Eagles	20	North Dakota	14	Carrara, QLD
2004	Downunder Bowl	Hawaii/California	33	Victorian Eagles	0	Carrara, QLD

Year	Event	Winning team	Score	Losing team	Score	Venue
2004	2004 Tour Game	Victorian Eagles	28	WA Raiders	19	Perth, WA

Year	Event	Winning team	Score	Losing team	Score	Venue
2003	2003 National Championships Game 2	Victorian Volunteers	1	ACT Monarchs (forfeit)	0	Pines Stadium, Adelaide, SA
2003	2003 National Championships Game 1	SA Fire	28	Victorian Eagles	14	Pines Stadium, Adelaide, SA

Year	Event	Winning team	Score	Losing team	Score	Venue
2001	2001 National Championships Game 3	ACT Monarchs	27	Victorian Volunteers	8	Canberra, ACT
2001	2001 National Championships Game 2	QLD Sundevils	24	Victorian Volunteers	12	Canberra, ACT
2001	2001 National Championships Game 1	WA Raiders	23	Victoria Volunteers	12	Canberra, ACT

Year	Event	Winning team	Score	Losing team	Score	Venue
2000	2000 Eastern Seaboard Championships Game 3	Victorian Volunteers	??	SA Fire	??	??
2000	2000 Eastern Seaboard Championships Game 2	Victorian Volunteers	??	NT Redbacks	??	??
2000	2000 Eastern Seaboard Championships Game 1	SA Fire	??	Victorian Volunteers	??	??

Year	Event	Winning team	Score	Losing team	Score	Venue
1999	1999 GA Eastern Regional's	Victorian Volunteers	18	NSW Wolfpack	8	Homebush, Sydney, NSW
1999	1999 GA Eastern Regional's	Victorian Volunteers	8	QLD Sundevils	0	Homebush, Sydney, NSW

Year	Event	Winning team	Score	Losing team	Score	Venue
1999	1999 GA National Challenge	Victorian Volunteers	1	ACT Monarchs (forfeit)	0	Penrith Panthers, NSW

Year	Event	Winning team	Score	Losing team	Score	Venue
1996	1996 National Championship Game	NSW Wolfpack	7	Victorian Volunteers	6	ACTFL Park, Canberra, ACT
1996	1996 National Championships Game 2	Victorian Volunteers	49	ACT Monarchs	6	ACTFL Park, Canberra, ACT
1996	1996 National Championships Game 1	Victorian Volunteers	14	SA Fire	35	ACTFL Park, Canberra, ACT

Year	Event	Winning team	Score	Losing team	Score	Venue
1991	1991 Tour Game	Victoria	22	South Australia	12	Adelaide, SA
1991	1991 Tour Game	Victoria	19	New South Wales	0	Olympic Park, Melbourne, VIC

Year	Event	Winning team	Score	Losing team	Score	Venue
1990	1990 Tour Game	Victorian All-Stars	19	South Auckland Raiders	19	Olympic Park, Melbourne, VIC

Year	Event	Winning team	Score	Losing team	Score	Venue
1989	1989 Tour Game	Aurgsberg College (NCAA Div 3)	41	Victoria	12	Olympic Park, Melbourne, VIC

Year	Event	Winning team	Score	Losing team	Score	Venue
1987	Curtain raiser to NCAA game	Victoria	26	South Australia	20	Princess Park, Carlton, VIC

== Gridiron Victoria Juniors State team results ==
Year	Event	Winning team	Score	Losing team	Score	Venue
2026	2026 AFA U18 Junior Nationals Game 3	Victorian Eagles	74	NSW Wolfpack	0	Mable Park State High School, Slacks Creek, QLD
2026	2026 AFA U18 Junior Nationals Game 2	Victorian Eagles	36	SA Sharks	12	Mable Park State High School, Slacks Creek, QLD
2026	2026 AFA U18 Junior Nationals Game 1	QLD Sundevils	14* (Game called early due to injury)	Victorian Eagles	12	Mable Park State High School, Slacks Creek, QLD

Year	Event	Winning team	Score	Losing team	Score	Venue
2026	2026 AFA U16 Junior Nationals Game 3	QLD Sundevils	34	Victorian Eagles	14	Mable Park State High School, Slacks Creek, QLD
2026	2026 AFA U16 Junior Nationals Game 2	QLD Sundevils	58	Victorian Eagles	16	Mable Park State High School, Slacks Creek, QLD
2026	2026 AFA U16 Junior Nationals Game 1	QLD Sundevils	58	Victorian Eagles	20	Mable Park State High School, Slacks Creek, QLD

Year	Event	Winning team	Score	Losing team	Score	Venue
2025	2025 AFA U18 Junior Nationals Game 2	Victorian Eagles	70	SA Sharks	13	Ranger Field, Croydon, VIC
2025	2025 AFA U18 Junior Nationals Game 1	QLD Sundevils	33	Victorian Eagles	26	Ranger Field, Croydon, VIC
2025	2025 AFA U16 Junior Nationals Game 1	Victorian Eagles	44	QLD Sundevils	30	Henry Turner Reserve, Footscray, VIC

Year	Event	Winning team	Score	Losing team	Score	Venue
2024	2024 AFA U18 Junior Nationals	Victorian Eagles	12	NSW/ACT Combined Team	0	??
2024	2024 AFA U18 Junior Nationals	Victorian Eagles	14	QLD Sundevils	8	Sydney Pargeter Reserve, Endeavour Hills, VIC

Year	Event	Winning team	Score	Losing team	Score	Venue
2023	2023 GA U20 Junior Nationals	QLD Sundevils	43	Victorian Eagles	30	Browns Plains, QLD
2023	2023 Gridiron Australia U20 Junior Nationals	Victorian Eagles	34	SA Sharks	20	Ranger Field, Croydon, VIC

Year	Event	Winning team	Score	Losing team	Score	Venue
2019	2019 GA U18 Junior Nationals 3rd Place Game	Victorian Eagles	62	SA Sharks	12	Sydney Academy of Sport, Narrabeen, NSW
2019	2019 GA U18 Junior Nationals Game 3	QLD Sundevils	35	Victorian Eagles	6	Sydney Academy of Sport, Narrabeen, NSW
2019	2019 GA U18 Junior Nationals Game 2	Victorian Eagles	38	Tasmania/ACT All-Stars	14	Sydney Academy of Sport, Narrabeen, NSW
2019	2019 GA U18 Junior Nationals Game 1	Victorian Eagles	14	NSW Wolfpack	10	Sydney Academy of Sport, Narrabeen, NSW

Year	Event	Winning team	Score	Losing team	Score	Venue
2016	2016 Victorian Eagles Tour Game 2	Victorian Eagles	53	Singapore American School Eagles	0	Singapore American School, Marsiling, Singapore
2016	2016 Victorian Eagles Tour Game 1	Victorian Eagles	46	Singapore American School Eagles	6	Singapore American School, Marsiling, Singapore

- Due to a policy disagreement between Gridiron Victoria and Gridiron Australia, the Junior Eagles were not allowed to compete in the 2016 Nationals Tournament. They instead organised a 2 game tour against the Singapore American School in Singapore.

Year	Event	Winning team	Score	Losing team	Score	Venue
2013	2013 Junior National Championships Game 3	Victorian Eagles	20	ACT Monarchs	6	Greenway Stadium, Greenway, ACT
2013	2013 Junior National Championships Game 2	WA Raiders	31	Victorian Eagles	12	Greenway Stadium, Greenway, ACT
2013	2013 Junior National Championships Game 1	QLD Sundevils	22	Victorian Eagles	18	Greenway Stadium, Greenway, ACT

Year	Event	Winning team	Score	Losing team	Score	Venue
2011	2011 Junior National 3rd Place Game	QLD Sundevils	47	Victorian Eagles	16	Sydney Academy of Sport, Narrabeen, NSW
2011	2011 Junior National Championships Game 2	Victorian Eagles	57	SA Fire	20	Sydney Academy of Sport, Narrabeen, NSW
2011	2011 Junior National Championships Game 1	WA Raiders	38	Victorian Eagles	14	Sydney Academy of Sport, Narrabeen, NSW

Year	Event	Winning team	Score	Losing team	Score	Venue
2009	2009 Junior National Championship Game	NSW Wolfpack	14	Victorian Eagles	6	Sports Super Centre, Runaway Bay, QLD
2009	2009 Junior National Championships Game 2	Victorian Eagles	14	Queensland Sundevils	8	Sports Super Centre, Runaway Bay, QLD
2009	2009 Junior National Championships Game 1	Victorian Eagles	54	ACT Monarchs	8	Sports Super Centre, Runaway Bay, QLD

Year	Event	Winning team	Score	Losing team	Score	Venue
2006	2006 Junior National Championships Game 4	Victorian Eagles	14	NSW	7	Tallebudgera Recreation Centre, Palm Beach, QLD
2006	2006 Junior National Championships Game 3	ACT monarchs	30	Victorian Eagles	6	Tallebudgera Recreation Centre, Palm Beach, QLD
2006	2006 Junior National Championships Game 2	Victorian Eagles	??	SA Fire	??	Tallebudgera Recreation Centre, Palm Beach, QLD
2006	2006 Junior National Championships Game 1	QLD Sundevils	28	Victorian Eagles	8	Tallebudgera Recreation Centre, Palm Beach, QLD

Year	Event	Winning team	Score	Losing team	Score	Venue
2005	2005 Junior Friendly	Victorian Eagles	34	ACT monarchs	0	Berwick, VIC
2005	2005 Junior Friendly	SA Sharks	20	Victorian Eagles	12	Pines Stadium, Adelaide, SA
2005	2005 Junior Friendly	SA Sharks	28	Victorian Eagles	24	Pines Stadium, Adelaide, SA

Year	Event	Winning team	Score	Losing team	Score	Venue
2004	2004 Junior National Championships	NSW Wolfpack	30	Victorian Eagles	0	Runaway Bay, QLD
2004	2004 Junior National Championships	Victorian Eagles	12	QLD Sundevils	8	Runaway Bay, QLD
2004	2004 Junior National Championships	Victorian Eagles	30	ACT Monarchs	6	Runaway Bay, QLD

Year	Event	Winning team	Score	Losing team	Score	Venue
2004	Junior VIC vs NZ	New Zealand	38	Victorian Eagles	20	Ranger Field

Year	Event	Winning team	Score	Losing team	Score	Venue
2003	Under 17’s Friendly Game	Victorian Eagles	26	SA Sharks	8	Ranger Field VIC

== Gridiron Victoria Womens State team results ==
Year	Event	Winning team	Score	Losing team	Score	Venue
2018	2018 Womens Nationals Championship Game	QLD Sundevils	38	Victorian Eagles	12	Perth, WA
2018	2018 Womens Nationals Game 3	Victorian Eagles	14	NSW Wolfpack	0	Perth, WA
2018	2018 Womens Nationals Game 2	Victorian Eagles	41	WA Raiders	14	Perth, WA
2018	2018 Womens Nationals Game 1	QLD Sundevils	48	Victorian Eagles	32	Perth, WA

Year	Event	Winning team	Score	Losing team	Score	Venue
2015	2015 Womens All-Star Game	Fire	28	Ice	20	State Hockey Centre, Parkville, VIC

- Australian first with 11 a side full NCAA uniform women's American Football game with the 2015 Gridiron Victoria All Star Game under lights at the State Hockey Center.

== Best & Fairest Trophy ==
The Victorian Gridiron Officials Association Best & Fairest Trophy is a perpetual award, presented to the player who displays the highest levels of gridiron skill throughout the senior season together with high levels of fairness and sportsmanship encouraged by the rules of the sport.

Three, two and one votes are allocated by the officiating crews at the conclusion of each senior match and these are totalled at the end of the regular season allowing the recipient to be determined.

Year	Player	Team
1986	Geoff Woollard	Brighton Outlaws
1987	Not	Awarded
1988	Arthur Spanos	Melbourne Hornets
1989	Brett Popplewell	Doncaster Devils
1990	Martin Veal	Doncaster Devils
1991	Tommy Burrell	Western Crusaders / Westside Vikings
1992	Michael Smith	Croydon Rangers
1993	Tim Gamble	Southern Bulls
1994	Dale Mitchell	Nunawading Warriors
1995	Dale Mitchell	Nunawading Warriors
1996	Byron McLachlan	Geelong Wildcats
1997	Byron McLachlan	Geelong Wildcats
1998	Richard Butcher	Western Crusaders / Westside Vikings
1999	Glenn Parke	Western Crusaders
2000	Kriss Guidotti	Geelong Wildcats
2001	Steve Churchill	Croydon Rangers
2002	Steve Churchill	Croydon Rangers
2003	Grant Lamb	Berwick Miners
2004	Judd Davidson & Steve Churchill	Croydon Rangers
2005	Karl Maslowski	Northern Blackhawks
2006	Kriss Guidotti	Bay City Buccaneers
2007	Nol Arabit	Western Crusaders
2008	Lincoln Decker (RB)	Monash Warriors
2009	Alex Moloney (WR)	Monash Warriors
2010	Daniel Barnett (RB)	Bay City Buccaneers
2011	Andrew Nixon (QB)	Berwick Miners
2012	Tyson Garnham (WR)	Western Crusaders
2013	Luke Jackson (RB)	Monash Warriors
2014	Daniel Barnett (RB)	Geelong Buccaneers
2015	Jordan Beck (RB)	Croydon Rangers
2016	Luke Jackson (RB)	Monash Warriors
2017	Ben Curley (RB)	Monash Warriors
2018	Brady Kelliher (QB)	Croydon Rangers
2019	No Season due to COVID-19	
2020	No Season due to COVID-19	
2021*	Mathew Krul (QB)	Western Crusaders
2022	Mathew Krul (QB)	Western Crusaders
2023	Cooper Maher (WR)	South Eastern Predators
2024	Tyson Garnham (WR/RB)	Western Crusaders
2025	DJ Battistella (WR)	Western Crusaders

- The 2021 season was delayed due to COVID-19 lock downs in Victoria and was conducted in Summer/Autumn 2022, before the regularly scheduled Spring/Summer season in 2022.

== See also ==
- Gridiron Australia
