= Down Under Bowl =

High school American football competition in Australia

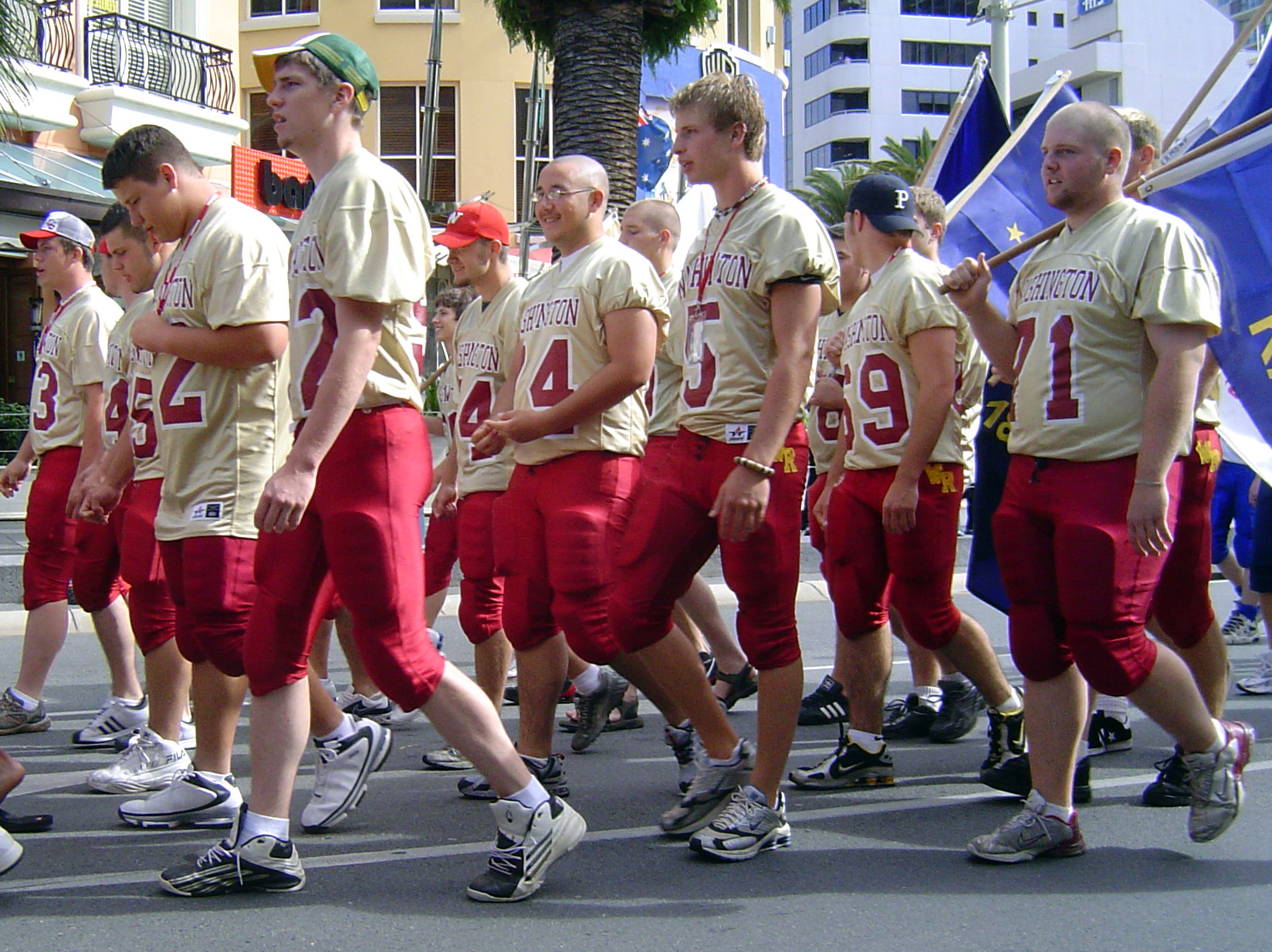
Wisconsin team at Down Under Bowl 2005

The Down Under Bowl, often spelled Downwinder Bowl or abbreviated DUB, is an annual American football competition, which started in 1990. Held on the Gold Coast, Australia, hundreds of high school American football players, coaches, cheerleaders and officials come to participate in the event, making it the largest American Football Championship Tournament held outside the United States. Australia and New Zealand also send teams to compete in the competition.

The event is held annually with games held towards the end of June. Championships are usually held on 3 July with the athlete's street parade and closing ceremony on 4 July, the United States Independence Day.

Teams are divided into brackets of four teams, with each team playing two games. The outcome of the first game determines whether a team's second game is a consolation or championship game. Games are played according to high school federation rules, officiated with one referee flown from the United States and the other officials supplied by Queensland Gridiron Officials Association.
