= Southern Districts Gridiron Club =

Division 1 American football team based in Adelaide, Australia

- Full name: Southern Districts Gridiron Club
- Nickname: Oilers
- Sport: Gridiron American football
- Founded: 1985
- First season: 1986
- League: South Australian Gridiron Association
- Location: Port Noarlunga Sports Club, Port Noarlunga South
- Colours: Navy Blue, White, Burnt Orange
- President: Matthew Whaites
- Head coach: Robert West-Mcinnes/Defensive Coordinator; Steve Rudd/Offensive Coordinator
- Members: Robert West-McInnes - Vice President; Steve Rudd - Treasurer; Bec Dunham - Secretary; Andrew Procter - Merchandise Manager; Daniel O'Connell - Sponsorship Coordinator; Josh Miller - Social Media Manager; Michael Tedmanson - Player Representative
- Website: oilersgridiron.com.au

Southern Districts Oilers are a Gridiron (also known as American football) team from Adelaide in the State of South Australia in Australia. They play in the South Australian Gridiron Association league.

== History ==
The game of American football was first played competitively in South Australia in 1985, at Norwood Oval. The Southern Districts Oilers, then known as the Longhorns, were one of the four founding clubs in 1985, along with the East Side Razorbacks, Port Adelaide Spartans and the Brighton Breakers. The Oilers faced off against the Spartans in the first ever game of the South Australian Gridiron Association. After 4 years, the league expanded by three teams - The Hectorville Eagles, South City Chiefs and the North Side Lions. In 1989, the Southern Districts Gridiron Club changed their nickname from the Longhorns (then wearing orange, black and white) to the Oilers(now wearing white and navy).

The first season as the new Oilers, consisting of a core of hardened Longhorn veterans, recruited well, matured quickly and went on to be a very competitive club. Making back-to-back final appearances in the first two seasons, the Oilers lost out by few points each year on the ultimate goal. In the 2002/2003 season, the Oilers finished Minor Premiers, not taking the Grand Final, but setting the bench mark as the team to beat. However, in 2004/2005, the Oilers were successful in taking the prestigious award of South Australian Champions. With its lowest numbers (15 players), the Oilers took on a strong Razorback team on a two-year unbeaten streak. Down by two scores at halftime, the "Ironman" Oiler squad came out strong. Motivated by key veterans Ken Gaudette, George Williams and Brett Hegarty, rising players Ben Stevens, Rob West-Mcinnes and Jarrad Anderson and the muscle of Michael "Fabs" Snell, Dan Reeves and James Sprules, the Oilers made two strong drives and used a turnover to help complete their goal and snapped a league record winning streak. The Oilers won the Grand Final by two points (20-18).

Over the years the Oilers have been very successful in the All-Star Awards, averaging 10 nominations each season. Oilers also have good representation in the State Championships, where 2010 saw its biggest contribution of 10+ players making the trip to Melbourne. The Oilers have also had players selected for the Australian side. Jarrad Anderson and Shawn Garner played against New Zealand in 2003 and Rob West-Mcinnes and Brad Bennett travelled to the UK to play against Great Britain and Sweden (Brad selected as Captain).

Today, the Oilers train at the Port Noarlunga Sports Club where they share the facility with the Port Noarlunga Football Club and play their games at City Mazda Stadium. The current role of head coach is shared between Steve Rudd and Rob West-Mcinnes with Steve acting as the offensive coordinator and Rob as the defensive coordinator.

== Uniform ==
When originally formed as the "Longhorns", the oiler colours were orange, black and white. When the club changed over to the "Oilers" in 1989, so did the colours. Using the new colors of white, navy and blue, new uniforms were created.

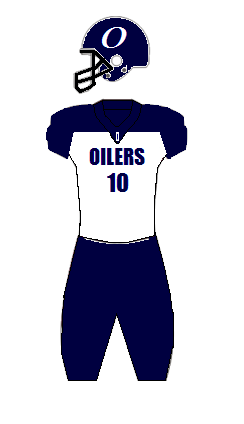

The current uniforms have been used since 2010 and may include a logo patch of a charitable local business that is the current season sponsor.

== Current roster ==
Player Name and Positions

- Robert West-McInnes - QB/TE/LB/DE
- Tavares Hines - RB/S
- Craig Symonds - RB/LB
- Jared Schutt - C/DT
- Paul Snelling - G/DT
- Matthew Whaites - FB/DE/LB
- Cameron Ledgard - G/T/DE
- Jamie O'langly - G/DT
- Kenneth Getsinger - T/DE
- Paul Clark - G/T/DT
- Ben Stevens - LB/TE/QB
- Mark Kievet - T/DE
- Kyle Smith - T/DE
- Hayden Mackin - WR/CB
- Steve Rudd - TE/QB/S
- Drew Poynter - TE/LB
- Michael Tedmanson - WR/DB
- Bryce Glasson - DE/WR
- Howard Chuang - WR/CB
- Sam Andt - WR/SS
- Paul Munce - TE/MLB
- Nathan Scutcheon - T/MLB
- Lee Von Stanke - T/LB
- Chris(English)Dewhurst - WR/CB
- John Tuckwood - G/DT
- Sam Furler - WR/RB
- Zak O'Toole - WR/CB
- Andrew Procter - WR/FS

== Club Honours ==
- 2004/2005 State Champions
- 1991/1992 State Runner-up
- 1992/1993 State Runner-up
- 2002/2003 State Runner-up
- 2006/2007 State Runner-up

== 2010 state reps ==
- George Williams
- Kyle Smith
- Jared Schutt
- Nathan McGrath
- Michael Tedmanson
- Brad Bennett
- Joshua Schutt
- Matthew Whaites
- Luke Wyten

== Australian representatives ==
The following Oiler players have represented the Australian National team;

- Bradley Bennett (Captain)
- Michael Tedmanson
- Rob West-Mcinnes
- Jared Anderson
- Shawn Garner

== Life members ==
- Ken Gaudette
- Brett Hegarty
- George Williams
