= Down Under =

Colloquial term usually referring to Australia and New Zealand

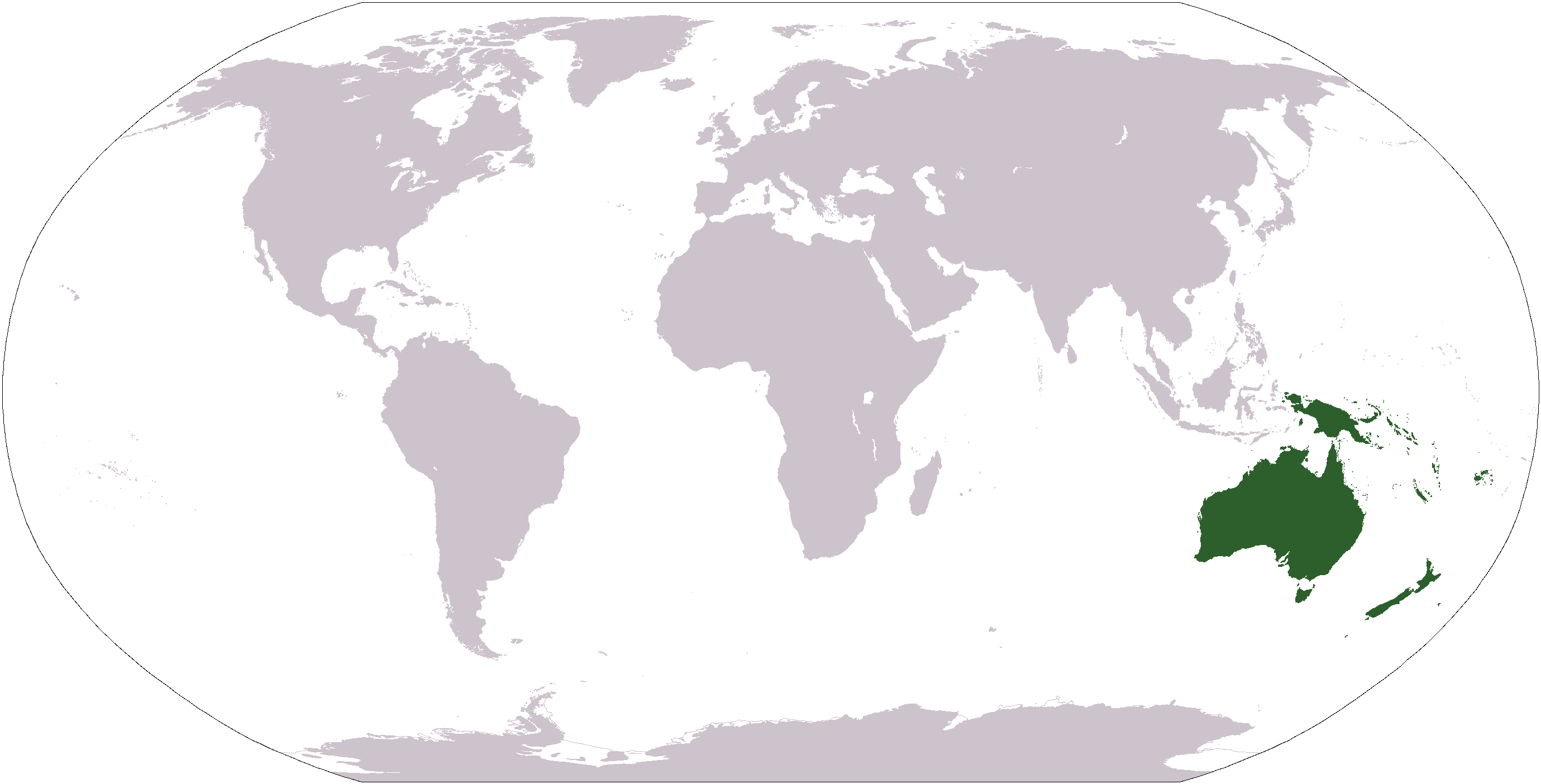
Australasia on a map

Down Under is a colloquialism differently construed to refer to Australia and New Zealand, or the Pacific island countries of Oceania collectively. The term originally referred solely to Australia and gradually expanded in scope. It comes from the fact that Australia is in the Southern Hemisphere, therefore located "down" and "under" almost all other countries on the usual arrangement of a map or globe which places cardinal north at the top.

"Down Under" represents Australia's distance and isolation from the rest of the world. During Apollo 11 in 1969, the signal from the moon was received at NASA's Honeysuckle Creek Tracking Station near Canberra, so television in Australia broadcast the video slightly before the rest of the world. A television executive boasted that "Just for once we were not at the end of the line, our accustomed place 'down under'".

The term has been in use since the late 19th century, and the persistence of the media use of the term has led to its wide acceptance and usage in reference to Australia.

According to American film critic Roger Ebert's tongue-in-cheek Glossary of Movie Terms, there exists an informal Down Under Rule:

No film set in Australia is allowed to use the word Australia in its title where “Down Under” is an acceptable alternative. For example, we don't get The Rescuers in Australia or Quigley in Australia.

== Examples of use ==
The Men at Work song "Down Under" became a patriotic rallying song for Australians. The Russian-Australian boxing champion Kostya Tszyu was nicknamed "The Thunder from Down Under", as is Australian snooker player Neil Robertson. When the then Miss Australia Jennifer Hawkins was crowned as Miss Universe 2004 in Quito, Ecuador, she was called by the same nickname by host Billy Bush.

The Tour Down Under is a cycling race in and around Adelaide, South Australia, and since 2009 has been the inaugural event of the UCI World Tour Ranking calendar, which culminates in the Giro di Lombardia.
