= Astra =

Astra (Latin for "stars") may refer to:

== People ==
- Astra (name)

== Places ==
- Astra, Chubut, a village in Argentina
- Astra (Isauria), a town of ancient Isauria, now in Turkey
- Astra, one suggested name for a hypothetical fifth planet that became the asteroid belt

== Entertainment ==
- Astra (Marvel Comics), the name of two otherwise unrelated Marvel Comics characters from 1977 and 1999, respectively
- Astra (DC Comics)
- Astra (2000 film), an Indian Kannada-language action drama film
- Astra (2012 film), a Bengali film
- Australian Subscription Television and Radio Association
- ASTRA Awards, annual awards presented by the Australian subscription television industry
- Astra, a character in the TV series Ultraman Leo

=== Music ===
- Astra Chamber Music Society, a Melbourne, Australia concert organization, formed in 1951
- Astra (band), an American psychedelic and progressive rock band
- Astra (album), a 1985 release by Asia
- Astra, a 1990 composition by Charles Wuorinen

== Sports ==
- FC Astra Giurgiu, a Romanian football club, currently playing in Liga I
- Astra Krotoszyn, a Polish sports club
- Los Angeles Astra, a women's ultimate team in the Western Ultimate League (WUL)

== Software ==
- Trillian Astra, a codename for a version of Trillian instant messaging (IM) client
- Astra (software), software to organize digital broadcasting services for TV operators and broadcasters, etc.
- Astra Linux, a Russian Linux-based computer operating system
- GPT-6 Astra, a large language model by OpenAI

== Transportation ==
=== Automobiles ===
- Astra (1920 automobile), an American automobile built by American company Dorris Motors
- Astra (1922 automobile), a French cyclecar made by E Pasquet
- Astra (1930 automobile), an automobile shown by Belgian company Automobiles Astra, but never produced
- Astra (1954 automobile), a microcar built by British Anzani until 1959
- Astra Veicoli Industriali, an Italian truck manufacturer, a subsidiary of IVECO
- Astra Bus, a bus manufacturer based in Romania
- Opel Astra, also known as the Chevrolet Astra and Saturn Astra, a small family car
  - Vauxhall Astra, a small family car sold as a rebadged Opel Kadett and later an Opel Astra
  - Holden Astra, a small family car sold as a rebadged Nissan Pulsar and later an Opel Astra

=== Aviation ===
- IAI Astra, an Israel Aircraft Industries-manufactured twin-engine business jet
- A Handley Page Hinaidi prototype, later used for barnstorming in England under the name Astra
- Stellar Astra, an American ultralight trike design
- Ultralight Engineering Astra, an ultralight aircraft
- Société Astra, a French airship and aeroplane manufacturer
- Astra Airlines, an airline based in Thessaloniki, Greece

=== Government ===
- Federal Roads Office, a Swiss government agency

=== Rail ===
- Astra Rail Industries, a Romanian rail vehicle manufacturer

=== Spaceflight ===
- Association in Scotland to Research into Astronautics, a Scottish space advocacy group
- Astra (American spaceflight company), a US launch service provider with its rocket Astra
- ASTRA program, a German future launcher technology research program from 1995 to 2005
- SES Astra, a subsidiary of SES that owns and operates communications satellites
- Astra (satellite), a family of satellites operated by SES S.A. through SES Astra

== Military and weaponry ==
- Astra (weapon), a supernatural weapon in Hindu mythology
- Astra (missile), an Indian beyond-visual-range air-to-air missile
- Astra-Unceta y Cia SA, Spanish weapons manufacturer

== Other uses ==
- Astra (beer)
- Astra (horse)
- Astra AB, former international pharmaceutical company based in Sweden
- Astra International, Indonesian conglomerate
- ASTRA (reactor), Adaptierter Schwimmbecken-Typ-Reaktor Austria, a type of nuclear reactor
- American Specialty Toy Retailing Association
- Transylvanian Association for Romanian Literature and the Culture of the Romanian People (abbreviated as ASTRA in Romanian)
- ASTRA, a branch of Altrusa International, Inc
- AstraSat, a former South African satellite television service

== See also ==
- Ad astra (disambiguation), a Latin phrase meaning "to the stars"
- Astro (disambiguation)
- Astram (disambiguation)
