= Astro =

Astro may refer to:

== Entertainment and media ==
- Astro (South Korean band), a South Korean boy band
- Astro (UB40) (born Terence Wilson) (1957–2021), rapper and member of the British reggae band UB40
- Astro (Chilean band), a Chilean indie rock band
- Astro (Japanese band), a Japanese noise music project
- Astro (album), a 2011 album by Chilean band Astro
- "Astro", a song by The White Stripes from their 1999 debut The White Stripes
- "Astro", a 2023 single by Blue Journey for Yoake no Uta
- Astro (The Jetsons), a dog character in the cartoon The Jetsons
- Astro Toilets, the main antagonists in the 2023 web series Skibidi Toilet

== People with the given name ==
- Astro (rapper) (born 1996), American rapper and actor
- Astro de Ogum (born 1957), Brazilian politician
- Astro Teller (born 1970), British computer scientist

== Satellites ==
- ASTRO (satellite), the Autonomous Space Transport Robotic Operations vehicle, an American technology demonstration satellite
- Project names of astronomy satellites by ISAS (now JAXA)
  - ASTRO-A or Hinotori (satellite), a solar X-ray astronomy satellite
  - ASTRO-B or Tenma, an X-ray astronomy satellite
  - ASTRO-C or Ginga (satellite), an X-ray astronomy satellite
  - ASTRO-D or Advanced Satellite for Cosmology and Astrophysics (ASCA), an X-ray astronomy satellite
  - ASTRO-E, and ASTRO-EII or Suzaku (satellite), an X-ray astronomy satellite
  - ASTRO-F or Akari (satellite), formerly known as IRIS, an infrared astronomy satellite
  - ASTRO-G or VSOP-2, a canceled radio astronomy satellite project
  - ASTRO-H or Hitomi (satellite), formerly known as NeXT, an X-ray astronomy satellite

== Science and medicine ==
- ASTRO (American Society for Radiation Oncology) or its annual conference
- the Arctic Stratospheric Ozone Observatory (AStrO), now the Polar Environment Atmospheric Research Laboratory (PEARL) in Eureka, Canada
- Astronomy
  - Astrobiology
  - Astrochemistry
  - Astro-geodetic methods, a group of important methods in geodesy, satellite techniques and astrometry
  - Astrometry
  - Astrophysics
  - Astropy
- Astronautics

== Sports and games ==
- Astro convention, a contract bridge bidding convention
- Astrodome, a sports venue in Houston, Texas, and the first home of the Houston Astros
- The Houston Astros, a Major League Baseball team
- Astro (video game), an indie video game developed by Delgoodie

== Television services ==
- Astro (company), All-Asian Satellite Television and Radio Operator, a Malaysian subscription-based multi-channel satellite TV and radio service
  - Astro MAX, a former personal video recorder service for Astro (Malaysian satellite television)
  - Astro Ria Malaysian pay television channel
  - Astro Vaanavil Malaysian pay television channel in Tamil language
  - Astro Wah Lai Toi (Astro 華麗台 in Traditional Chinese) a Cantonese television channel, operated by Astro (Malaysia) and HKB (Hong Kong)
- Astro Malaysia Holdings, media holding company

== Vehicles ==
- Chevrolet Astro, a "mid-size" van
- GMC Astro, a cabover tractor-trailer truck made by GMC from 1968 to 1988
- Astro-Gnome, an American automobile

== Other ==
- Adobe Flash Player version 10
- Astrology
- Astro (Motorola), used to describe the digital voice radios produced by Motorola
- Astro navigation, celestial navigation, positional astronomy, navigating by the stars
- Astro yogourt, a Parmalat Canada product
- Amazon Astro, a household robot made by Amazon
- Astro Gaming, American manufacturer of gaming peripherals
- Astro Bot (series), a series of platforming video games developed by Team Asobi (formerly Japan Studio)
  - Astro Bot Rescue Mission, a 2018 platforming video game developed by Japan Studio released for PlayStation VR
  - Astro's Playroom, a 2020 platforming video game developed by Team Asobi which comes pre-installed on every PlayStation 5 console
  - Astro Bot, a 2024 platforming video game developed by Team Asobi released for PlayStation 5

== See also ==
- Astra (disambiguation)
- Astro Arena (disambiguation)
- Astros (disambiguation)
