= Astros (disambiguation) =

Astros in sports may refer to:

- The Houston Astros, a Major League Baseball team
- Astros (gridiron team), an American football team in Australia
- Astros Field, now renamed Daikin Park

Astros may also refer to:

- Astros (album), by Colombian singer-songwriter Anasol
- Astros, Greece, a municipality in Arcadia, Greece
- The Astros II MLRS rocket launcher
- a candy brand Astros (chocolate)
- ASTROS, Automated STRuctural Optimization System

== See also ==
- Astro (disambiguation)
