= Astra (name) =

Astra is a female given name.

Astra is primarily used in the English language. It is of Old Greek and Old Norse origin. Old Greek origin: It is derived from the word 'aster' which means star.

In addition, Astra is a form of the Dutch, English, German, and Scandinavian name Astrid.

Notable people with the name include:

== Given name ==
- Astra Biltauere (born 1944), Latvian volleyball player
- Astra Blair (born 1932), British opera singer, agent, and charity fundraiser
- Astra Desmond (1893–1973), British singer
- Astra Edwards (born 1981), Trinidad and Tobago table tennis player
- Astra Goldmane (born 1956), Latvian chess player
- Astra Klovāne (born 1944), Latvian chess player
- Astra Rībena (born 1959), Latvian luger
- Astra Sharma (born 1995), Australian tennis player
- Astra Taylor (born 1979), Canadian-American documentary filmmaker
- Astra Zarina (1929–2008), American architect
- Astra Zero, Canadian artist

== Surname ==
- Gunārs Astra (1931–1988), Latvian human rights activist

== See also ==
- Astra (disambiguation)
