= John Ludwig Wees =

American architect

John Ludwig Wees (1861 - 1942) was an architect in the United States. Several buildings he designed in St. Louis, Missouri and Paris, Texas are listed on the National Register of Historic Places. He immigrated to the United States and moved west to St. Louis where he eventually became a partner at the firm Beinke & Wees.

He was involved in a lawsuit seeking fees for work he did while part of Beinke & Wees. He moved to Paris, Texas after a fire destroyed part of its downtown.

== Work ==
- Beethoven Conservatory, 2301 Locust St. in St. Louis (Beinke & Wees). NRHP listed
- Lewis Dozier Mansion in St. Louis
- 1907 Dorris Motor Car Company Building at 4063-4065 Forest Park Avenue in St. Louis, NRHP listed
- Dorris Motor Car Company building at 4100 Laclede in St. Louis
- Old B'nai El Temple, 3666 Flad Avenue in St. Louis. NRHP listed.
- Edwin F. Guth Company Complex at 2615 Washington Avenue in St. Louis, NRHP listed
- Halsey-Packard Building, 2201-11 Locust in St. Louis. NRHP listed
- Lister Building, 4500 Olive St. in St. Louis. NRHP listed.
- Scott-Roden Mansion, 425 S. Church St. in Paris, Texas. NRHP listed
- Building in Paris Commercial Historic District in Paris, Texas
