= Jesse French =

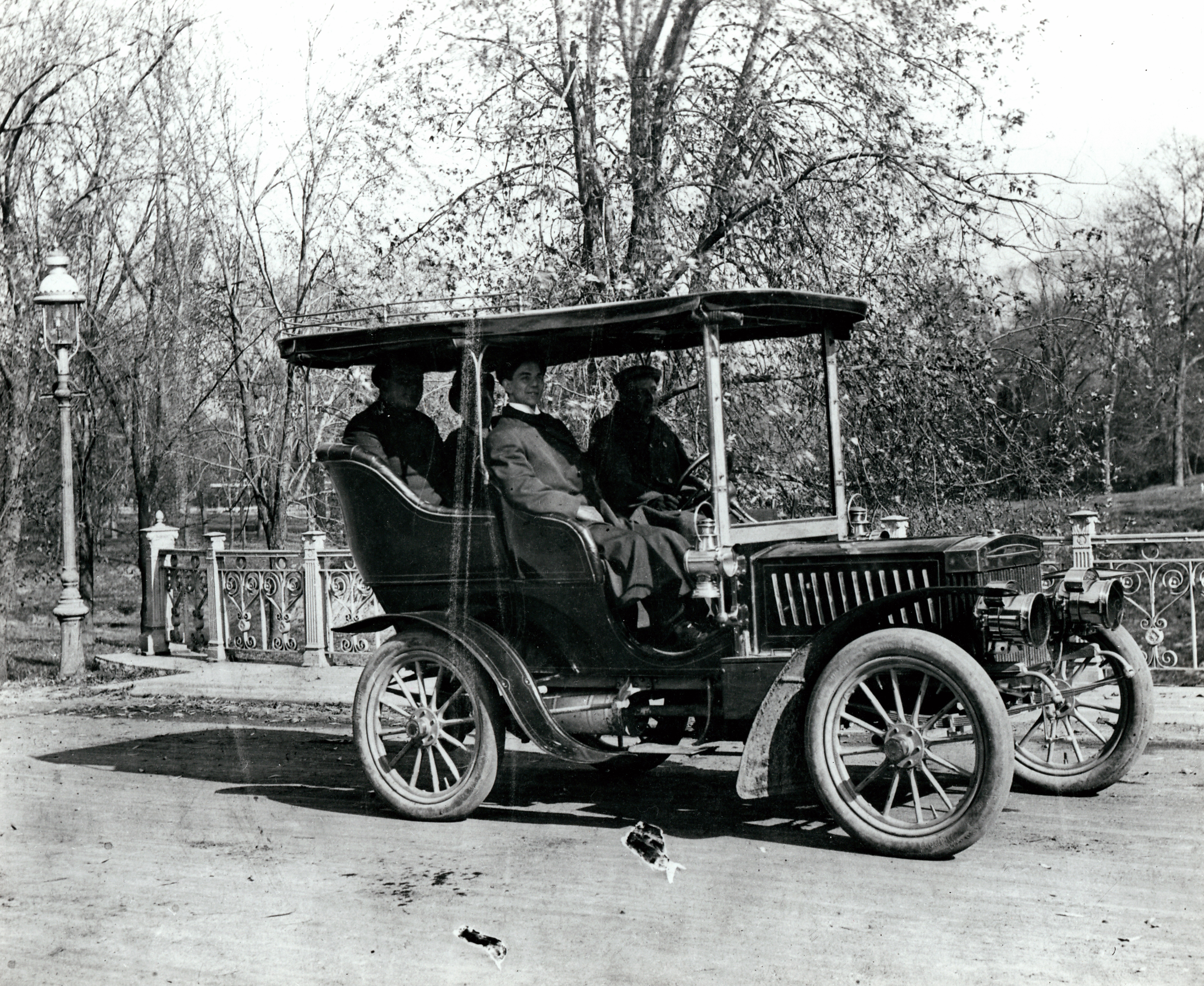
Jesse French Sr. driving a 1904 "St. Louis" model car from the St. Louis Motor Carriage Company in St. Louis

Jesse French (23 July 1846 – 7 May 1927) was an American piano manufacturer and philanthropist.

== Life and career ==
The son of Jacob and Mary Ann French, Jesse French was born in Devonshire, England, on 23 July 1846. In 1848, he moved with his family to Nashville, Tennessee. He was educated in Nashville Public Schools and at Brown's Business College in Peoria (now Midstate College). He married Callie Lumsden on January 2, 1872.

French began his career working for a printer. During the American Civil War, he worked for the United States Postal Service at a branch in Nashville. He then worked in the office of the Tennessee Secretary of State, ultimately rising to the role of Assistant Tennessee Secretary of State, a post he held for seven years.

In 1872, he ran for Tennessee Secretary of State, but lost the election by a single vote. That same year, he founded a sheet music business in Nashville. Three years later became a partner in the Nashville piano retail firm of Dorman, French & Smith.

In 1885, he founded the Jesse French Piano and Organ Company, a Nashville piano manufacturer. His sons Horace Edgar French and Jesse French Jr. joined the company, which would become one of the largest music businesses in the South and influential in the development of ragtime.

Two years later, French established a second company, the Field-French Piano Company, in St. Louis, Missouri. Its office was at 1111 Olive Street. It expanded into other cities as well, but was eventually be folded into French’s Nashville business.

Around 1890, French’s company built a building in Nashville at 240 5th Avenue North. It appears in a 1900 Calvert Brothers photograph next to the Camp Sewing Machine Company building. It would also be photographed for the Historic American Buildings Survey. In 2011, it would be listed as an endangered landmark.

French sold the business in 1902.

Around 1900, French had become a partner in the Ohio-based Krell Piano Company, which had been renamed the French-Krell Piano Company. He later founded the Jesse French & Sons Piano Company in New Castle, Indiana, where the family operated a manufacturing plant. The plant is pictured on a bookmark and in a Krell-French Piano Company advertisement. A Music Trade Review insert from November 3, 1900, includes photographs of executives Albert Krell, Jesse French, Edwin B. Pfau, and H. Edgar French.

Jesse French died on May 7, 1927, in New Castle, Indiana.

== See also ==
- List of piano manufacturers
