= Dorothy Morton =

American stage actress

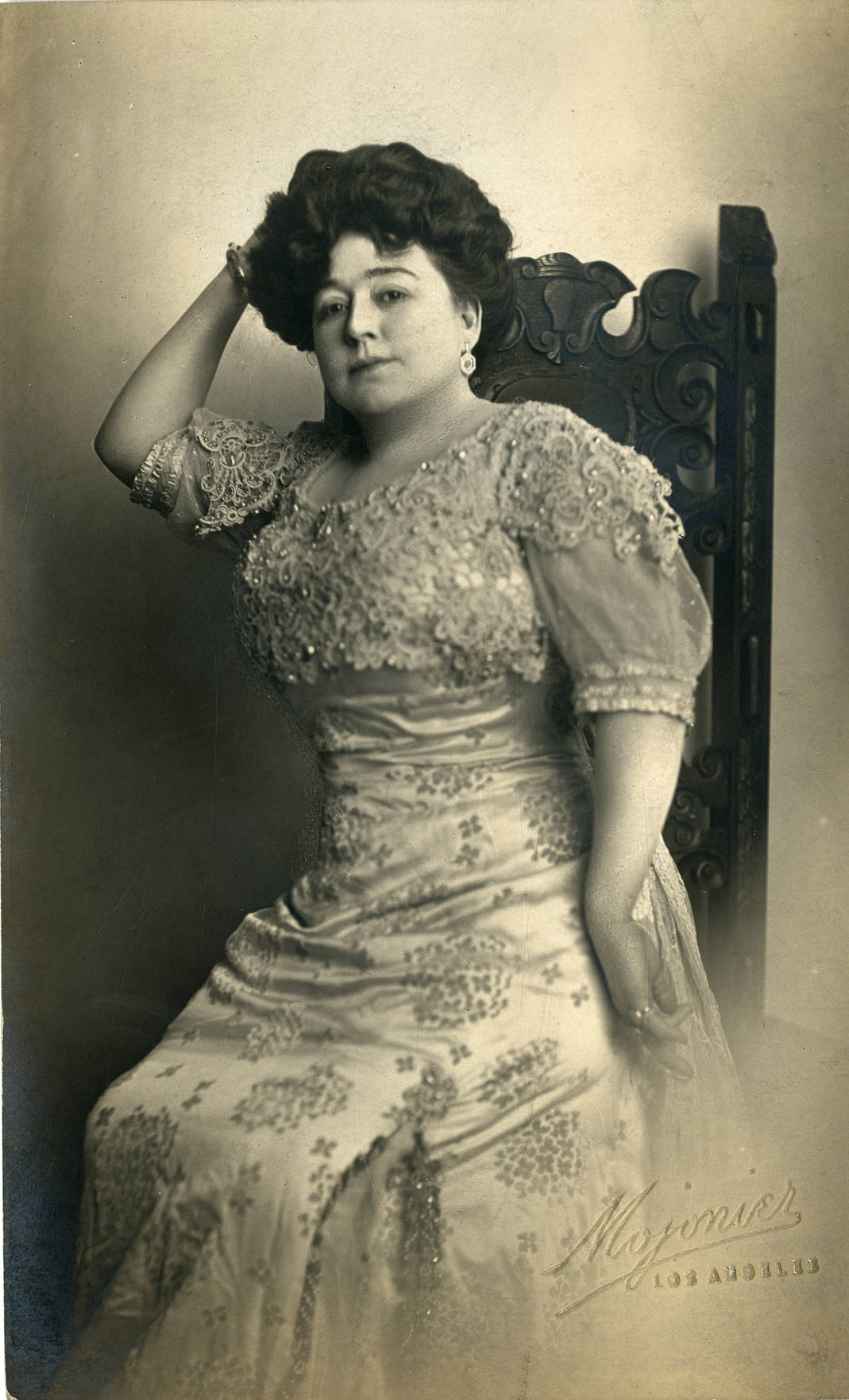
1910 photograph of Dorothy Morton

Libbie McCarthy [Macarty] Conger (June 28, 1869 – April 15, 1939), better known publicly by her stage name Dorothy Morton, was an American stage actress and soprano who had an active career in mainly light operas and musical theatre from the 1880s until her retirement from the stage in 1918. She also occasionally appeared on the stage in grand opera roles like Santuzza in Cavalleria rusticana and Marguerite in Faust, and in vaudeville. She is best remembered for her work on Broadway; including creating the role of Cleopatra in Victor Herbert's The Wizard of the Nile (1895) and portraying the title role in the United States premiere of Sidney Jones' The Geisha (1896); the latter part the most significant of her career.

== Early life and education ==
Dorothy Morton was born with the name Libbie McCarthy on June 28, 1869, in St. Louis, Missouri. While several later sources on the singer use the spelling McCarthy, newspaper articles from the singer's childhood and early adulthood use the spelling Macarty, and she stated in an 1888 interview in The Kansas City Star that "her name must not be spelled McCarthy" but Macarty.

Morton was educated at the Visitation Academy of St. Louis, and began her professional musical training at The Beethoven Conservatory in her native city. She began performing as a singer at community events and concerts in St. Louis in her youth. In 1882, at the age of thirteen, she performed in a concert at the St. Louis Mercantile Library, and the following year she performed leading roles with The Juvenile Dramatic Company at Uhrig's Cave Hall. She also sang in the choir at St. Francis Xavier College Church. While still a teenager, she studied for three years at the New England Conservatory of Music in Boston.

== Early career ==
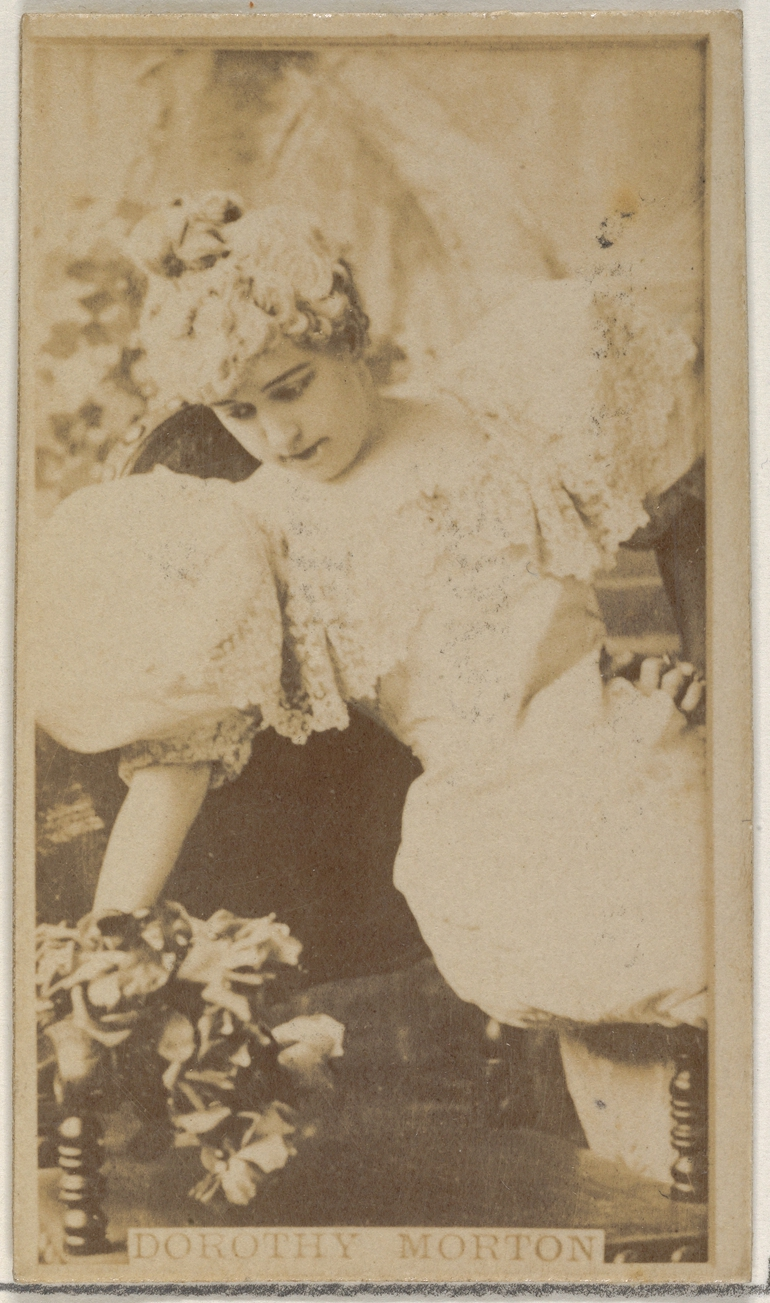
Dorothy Morton (c. 1888)

Morton began her professional stage career performing with the Henderson Opera Company in St. Louis, and then on tour. In the Spring of 1888 she joined the touring production of William A. Mestayer's The Tourists in the Pullman Palace Car with the Kirke & Clarke theatre troupe. She then worked as a member of 'Hallen and Hart', a theatre troupe led by actors Fred Hallen and Joe Hart, from 1888 to 1890. With that company she portrayed the role of Mollie Waits in Henry Grattan Donnelly's musical farce Later On; initially using the stage name 'Doddie Morton'. A touring production, the company took the musical to a variety of theaters throughout the United States, including Hooley's Theatre in Chicago, Broadway's Star Theatre, the Grand Opera House, Brooklyn, and the Bush Street Theatre in San Francisco. By the time the tour reached Sacramento's Metropolitan Theatre in April 1890, she was billed as Dorothy Morton;

Morton spent the summer of 1890 in St. Louis performing with the Spencer Opera Company at Uhrig's Cave. In October 1890 she joined the national tour of Clay M. Greene's Blue Beard, Jr.; portraying the role of Fatima. The production had previously premiered in Chicago in June 1889 with Alice Johnston as Fatima, and then commenced a national tour. When the production arrived at Niblo's Garden on Broadway in January 1890, Edith Murilla was in the part. Morton took over the role ten months later in Nashville, and subsequently performed the part in Little Rock, Philadelphia, Baltimore, Buffalo, New York, Detroit, Indianapolis, and St. Louis among other cities.

== Wilbur Opera Company ==
Morton's final appearance as Fatima was in Minneapolis in May 1891; after which she was engaged as a leading soprano with the touring Wilbur Opera Company. She made her debut with the company as Countess Bathilde in Edmond Audran's Les noces d'Olivette in June 1891 at the Metropolitan Opera House in Minneapolis. Her subsequent repertoire with the company included Edwidge in Falka, Fiametta in The Mascot, Jelly in Princess Toto, Lydia Hawthorne in Dorothy, Minna in Carl Millöcker's The Black Hussar (German Der Feldprediger), Queen Mary in Richard Genée's Fanchette, or The Royal Middy (German Der Seekadett), Stella in Franz von Suppé's Clover, or The Search for Luck (German: Die Jagd nach dem Glück), Wanda in La Grande-Duchesse de Gérolstein, Zerline in Fra Diavolo, and the title roles in Boccaccio. Erminie, and Nell Gwynne.

Morton briefly left the Wilbur Opera Company in late October 1892; complaining of being overworked and mistreated by management in reports to the press. Negative consequences immediately followed for Morton after her decision to leave in such a public manner. In response to Morton's interviews criticizing the Wilbur company, Morton was physically assaulted by three of her former colleagues, sisters Edith and Maud Daniels and Fannie Lyons, who attacked her with a rawhide which they repeatedly whipped her on the head with outside of a theatre with an onlooking crowd. Their actions led to a police intervention and arrest of the women; events which made national headlines. Ultimately the women were charged and found guilty in court of an unprovoked assault; and were made to pay fines and court costs. Additionally, Wilbur brought a lawsuit against Morton in an attempt to gain an injunction against her performing elsewhere.

Ultimately, conflicts between Morton and Wilbur resolved, and she continued to perform with company after Wilbur fired the women who assaulted her. Her tenure with the company was interrupted again in February 1893 when Morton was injured in her dressing room just prior to a performance of La Grande-Duchesse de Gérolstein at a theatre in Springfield, Massachusetts. The singer, now in the title role of that opera, was struck by a piece of broken pipe after the heating pipes in her dressing room burst; causing a serious flesh wound to her head which knocked her unconscious. The Cincinnati Post wrote that the "beads of the coronet worn by the Grand Duchess in the opera, which Morton had just placed on her head, were buried deep in the flesh" of her head, and that doctors initially feared that she had blood poisoning due to their material makeup. However, she was back on stage a few weeks later at the New Haven Opera House in Boccaccio; this time as Fiametta.

== Later career ==
By June 1893, Morton had left the Wilbur Opera Company and was engaged with the Glenwood Park Opera Company for performances in St. Louis and Little Rock; including the role of Josephine in Gilbert and Sullivan's H.M.S. Pinafore. She then appeared with the Baker Opera Company as Erminie in Robert Macaire, or The Two Thieves in Rochester, New York in July 1893; a pirated version of Erminie that was alleged to have been written by the English dramatist Harry Paulton. Paulton, however, knew nothing of this work, and the piece was a pirated version of that opera. The impresario Rudolph Aronson, who owned the rights to Erminie in the United States, sued Parker in federal court to prevent further performances of the opera, but ultimately the court ruled he could only stop companies from performing works under the title Erminie but not prevent pirated versions of the opera being performed under other names.

After further performances with Baker's company in Fra Diavolo and The Mascot, Morton spent a period working in vaudeville at Shea's Music Hall in Buffalo, New York, beginning in August 1893. In October 1893 she joined a touring troupe in the role of Fanny Meredith in a new musical by Hubbard T. Smith, Paradise Flats. The work was written as a starring vehicle for actor Louis De Lange and also featured the character actress Jennie Reiffarth. While Morton and Reiffarth received positive reviews in the press for their individual parts, De Lange and the work as a whole were critically panned and the musical ceased performances after touring to Buffalo, Rochester, and Elmira in the state of New York. After this Morton, returned to vaudeville performance at Robinson's Musee Theatre in Rochester.

In January 1894 Morton joined an opera company led by Adele Ritchie as Suzette in a production of Reginald De Koven's The Algerian in which she first appeared in the part in Fort Worth. She toured with the production to several cities, including a stops at the Chicago Opera House the St. Louis Grand Opera House, and the Montreal Academy of Music among other theatres. She was particularly praised in this production for her performance of the aria "The Legend of the Rose".

In 1895 Morton originated the role of Cleopatra in Victor Herbert's operetta The Wizard of the Nile. The Casino Theatre production was very well received, and significantly raised Morton's profile as one of the nation's top operetta actresses. The following year she had the biggest success of her career portraying the title role in the original Broadway production and United States premiere of Sidney Jones' The Geisha. The work had a long run on Broadway, and after it ended Morton toured nationally in the operetta.

Morton continued to perform until her retirement from the stage in 1918. Her other roles on Broadway included Maia in A Greek Slave (1899), Dolores in the 1902 revival of Florodora, and Celeste in the original production of Reginald De Koven's The Wedding Trip. She briefly performed in and managed her own opera troupe, the Dorothy Morton Opera Company.

== Personal life and death ==
Morton married the actor Elgin Rowe in 1892. The marriage lasted for four years; ending in divorce in May 1896. She later married the art collector Frederick Conger, and their marriage lasted until his death in 1929.

Morton died at the age of 69 on April 15, 1939, in Bound Brook, New Jersey. She died after a year and a half long illness at her home, "Geisha Villa", which she named after the part she played in Sidney Jones's operetta.

== Bibliography ==
- Bordman, Gerald Martin; Norton, Richard (2010). American Musical Theatre: A Chronicle. Oxford University Press. ISBN 9780199729708.
- Franceschina, John (2004). Harry B. Smith: Dean of American Librettists. Taylor & Francis. ISBN 9781135949082.
- Gänzl, Kurt (1994). The Encyclopedia of the Musical Theatre, Volume 2. Schirmer Books. ISBN 9780028714455.
