= St. Louis Motor Company =

Defunct American motor vehicle manufacturer

St. Louis Motor Carriage Company St. Louis Motor Car Company
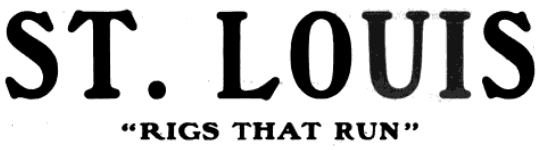

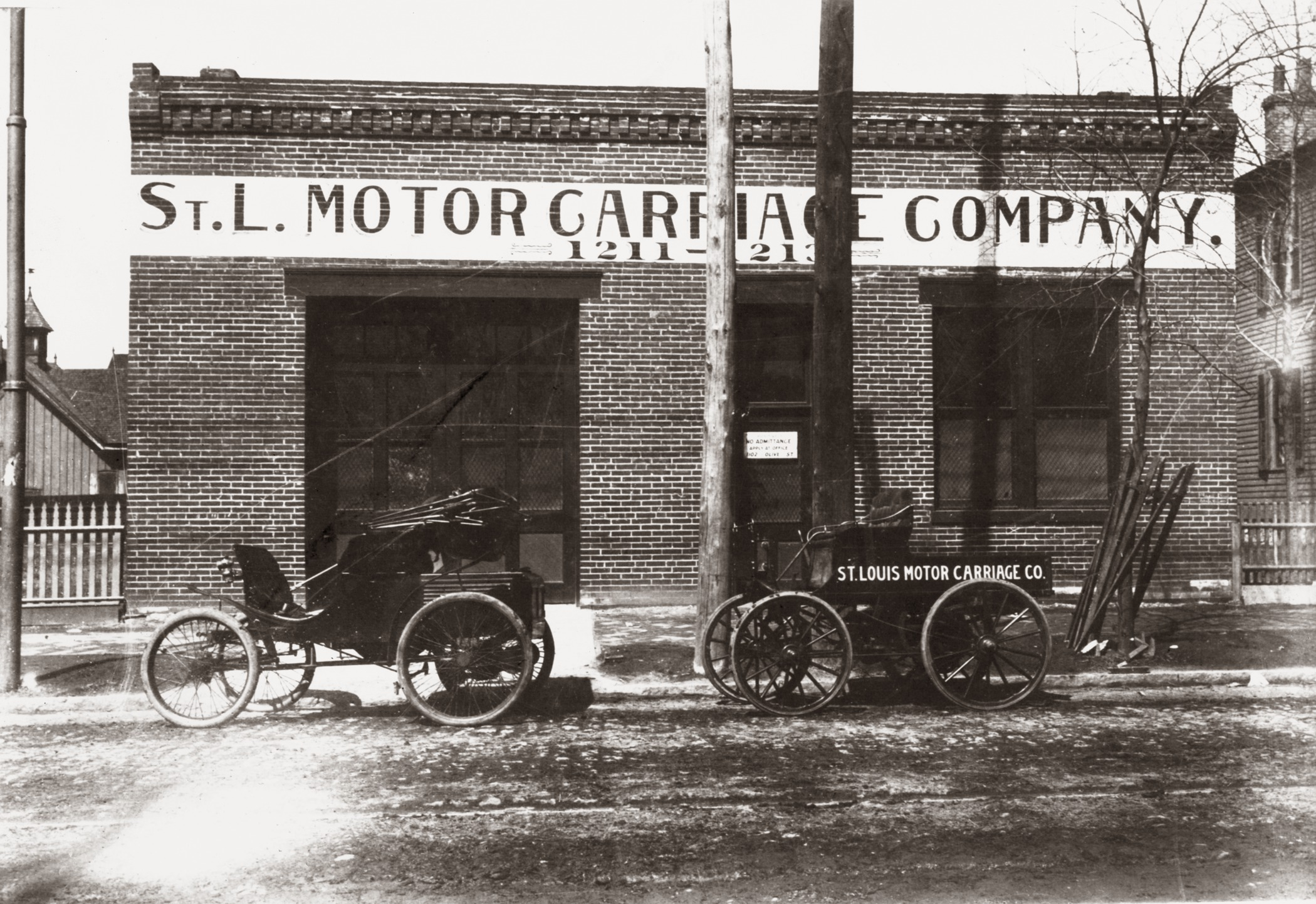
- St. Louis Motor Carriage Company factory, 1211-13 North Vandeventer Avenue
- Industry: Automotive
- Founded: 1898; 128 years ago
- Founder: George Preston Dorris and John L. French
- Defunct: 1907; 119 years ago
- Fate: Bankruptcy
- Headquarters: St. Louis, Missouri and later Peoria, Illinois, United States
- Area served: United States
- Key people: George Dorris, John French, Jesse French Sr., Jesse French Jr.
- Products: Vehicles
- Production output: 1,793 (1899-1907)

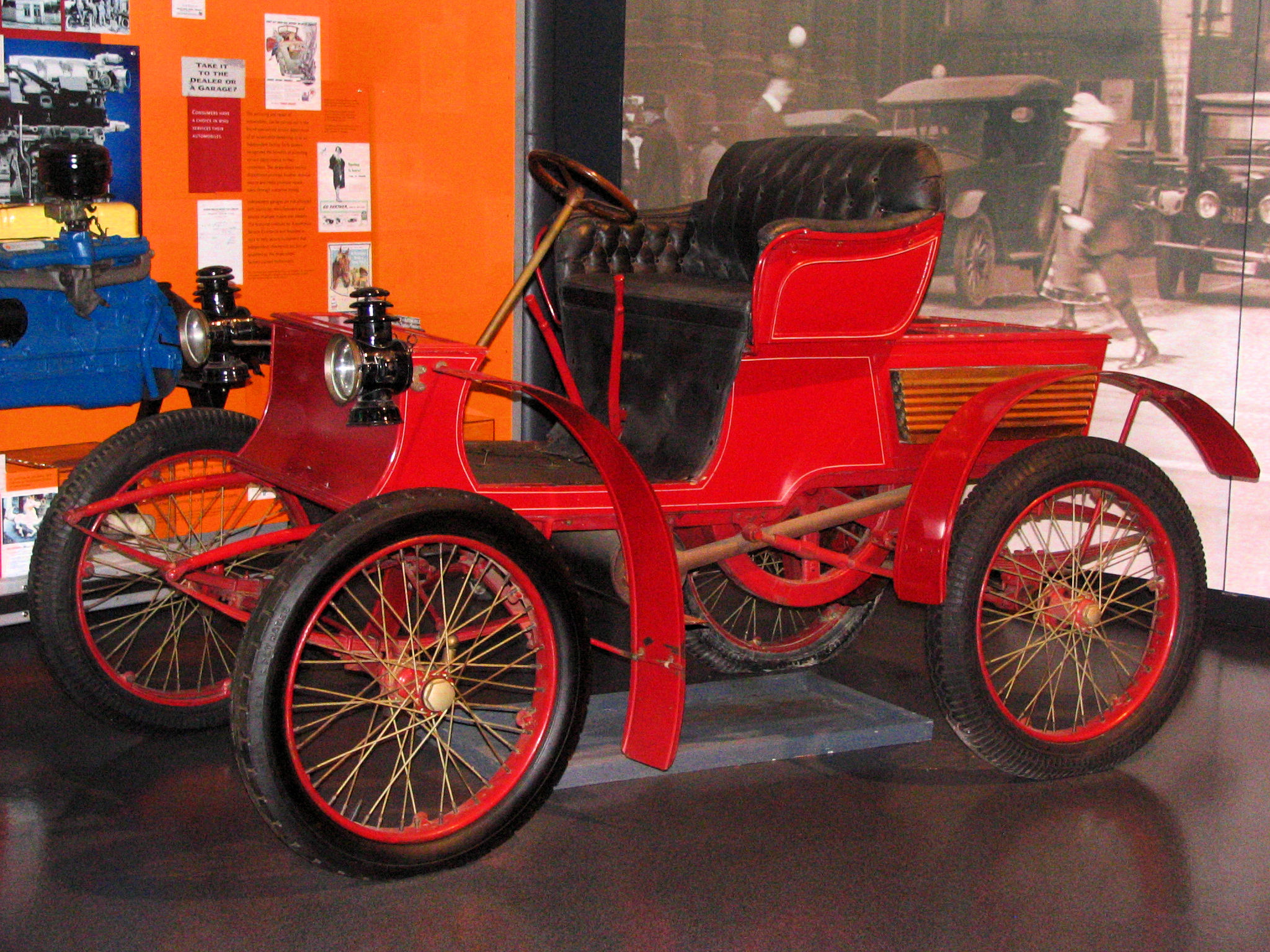
1901 St. Louis at National Museum of Transportation

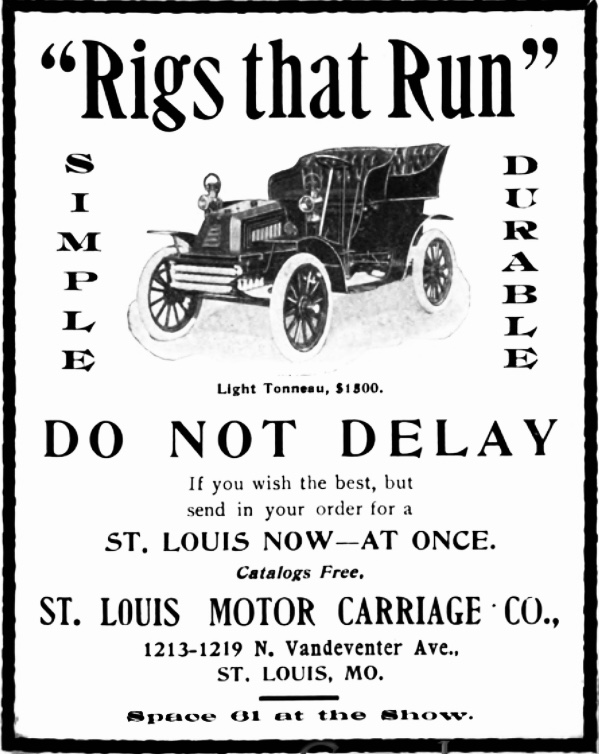
St. Louis Tonneau (1904)

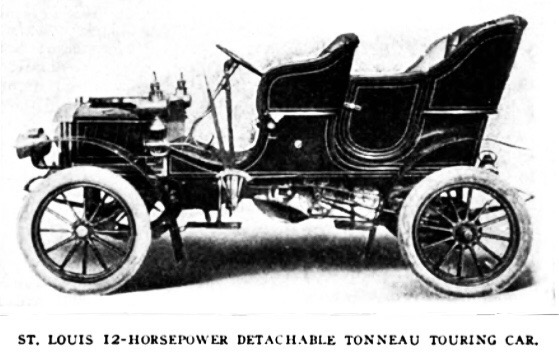
St. Louis 12 hp (1905)

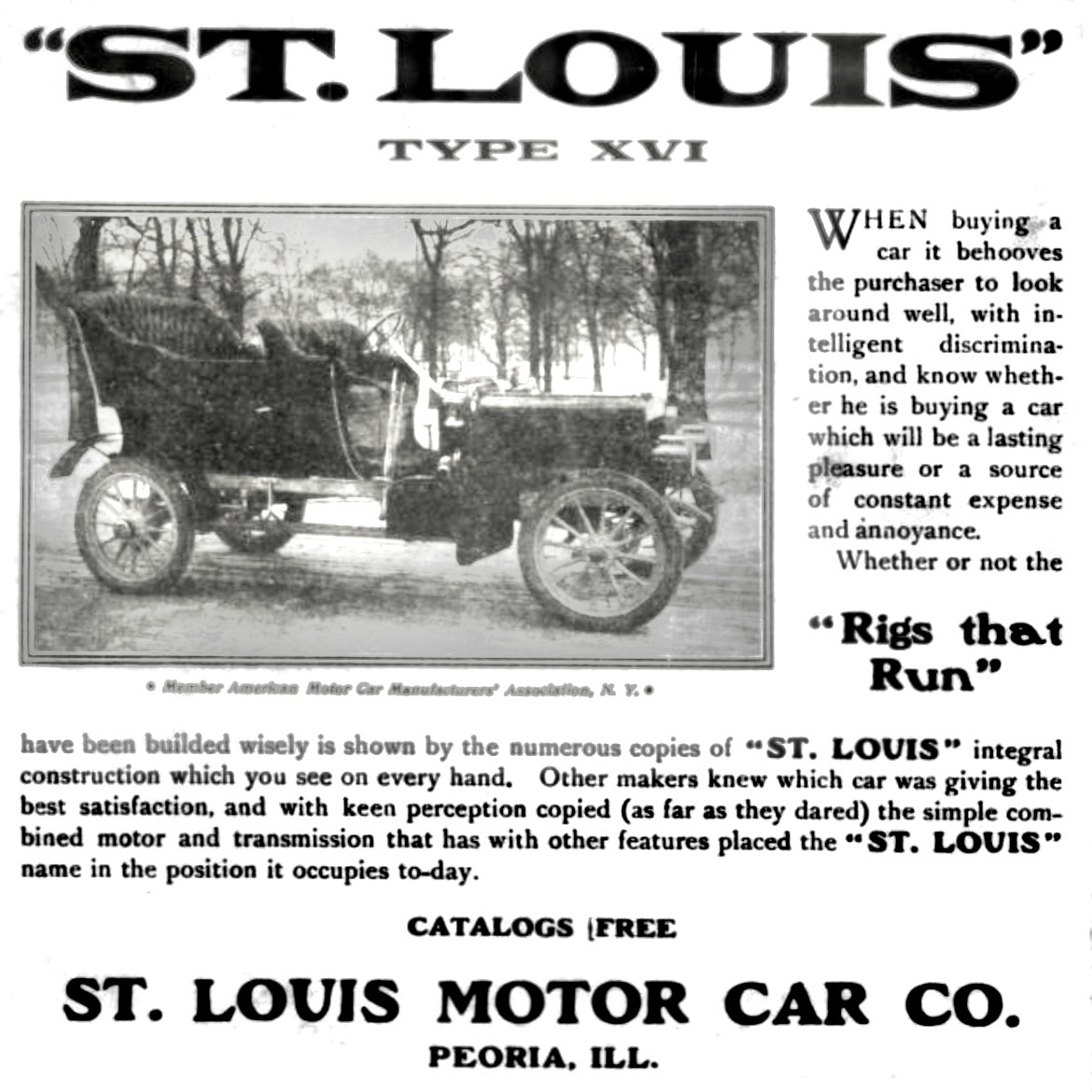
St. Louis Model XVI (1906-1907)

St. Louis Motor Carriage Company was the first manufacturer of automobiles in St. Louis, Missouri, which would become an early 20th-century hub of auto production. Founded in 1898, it produced automobiles from 1899 to 1907.

Its founders were John L. French, who handled marketing, and George Preston Dorris, who led engineering and production and would later be credited with developing and patenting the float-carburetor. Its factory stood at 1211–13 North Vandeventer Avenue.

== History ==
George Dorris was an automotive pioneer who built his first experimental car in 1895 in Nashville. John French, also from Nashville, persuaded his father, pianomaker Jesse French, Sr., to put up most of the money needed to form St. Louis Motor Carriage Company. A purpose-built factory was built in St. Louis.

The first St. Louis models had single and twin-cylinder engines, chain drive and a steering lever for steering. In 1901 there were five models to choose from; single-cylinder models from 7hp to 10hp and two-cylinder models from 15hp to 25hp. Prices started at $1,000, equivalent to $38,700 in 2025.

In 1900, John French drove a St. Louis on the first automobile trip between St. Louis and Chicago. In 1901 he was one of only three drivers to finish in a New York-to-Buffalo race.

In 1902 a steering wheel was introduced. A new model was a 35hp four-cylinder engine touring car was available for one year only. The single and twin-cylinder engines remained in production. By 1904 there were two models with single-cylinder engines, the runabout and tonneau . A 24hp three-cylinder engine was introduced with a tonneau body.

In 1905 the cars consisted of a choice of a 12hp with a single-cylinder engine, 16hp with a two-cylinder engine or 20/24hp with a three-cylinder engine. All models had an 86-inch wheelbase with a side-entrance tonneau body.

=== Peoria, Illinois ===
The St. Louis Motor Carriage Company moved to Peoria, Illinois, in 1905 and became the St. Louis Motor Car Company. A new three-story factory on 10 acres was constructed. George Dorris started his own car company, the Dorris Motor Car Company, in the former St. Louis Motor Carriage plant in 1906 Dorris motor cars were in production until 1926.

From 1906 all St. Louis cars had a four-cylinder engine with a drive-shaft. The models received Roman numerals as designations. The Type XV had an engine rated at 30/34hp and a wheelbase of 104-inches. The Type XVI had a more powerful 32/36hp engine on a longer 108-inch wheelbase. Both were touring cars with five seats.

In 1907 there were three models to choose from; Type XVII had a 35hp engine and was designed as a two-seater runabout. The Type XVIII was identical except for being a five-seat touring car. The Type XIX had an engine with 45/50 hp and a wheelbase of 112-inches. It was available as a touring car with five or seven seats. From 1906 all cars were priced in the $2,000 range with the Tye XIX priced at $3,000, equivalent to $69,107 in 2025.

With the cost of the expansion, in July 1907, Jesse French, Jr. reported the company was financially in trouble. In August, St. Louis Motor Car Company was in receivership and the Panic of 1907 dried up rescue financing. By December, the factory was sold for $10,000.

== Gallery ==
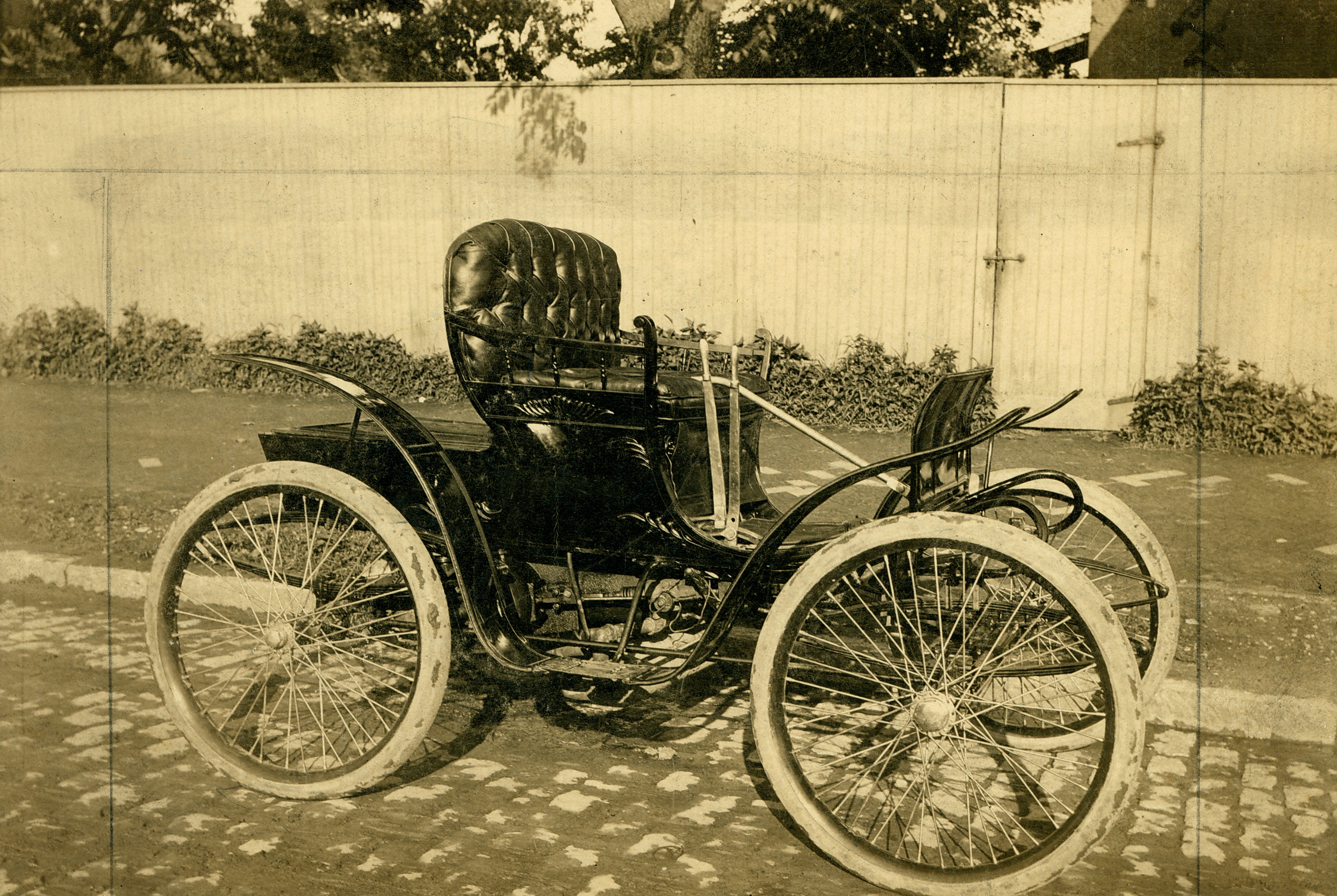
First automobile built by the St. Louis Motor Carriage Company. The car was completed in late April or early May of 1899 and sold to A.L. Lambrechts of St. Louis.

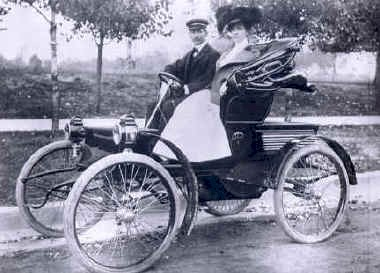
George Dorris and his wife in a 1901 St. Louis runabout

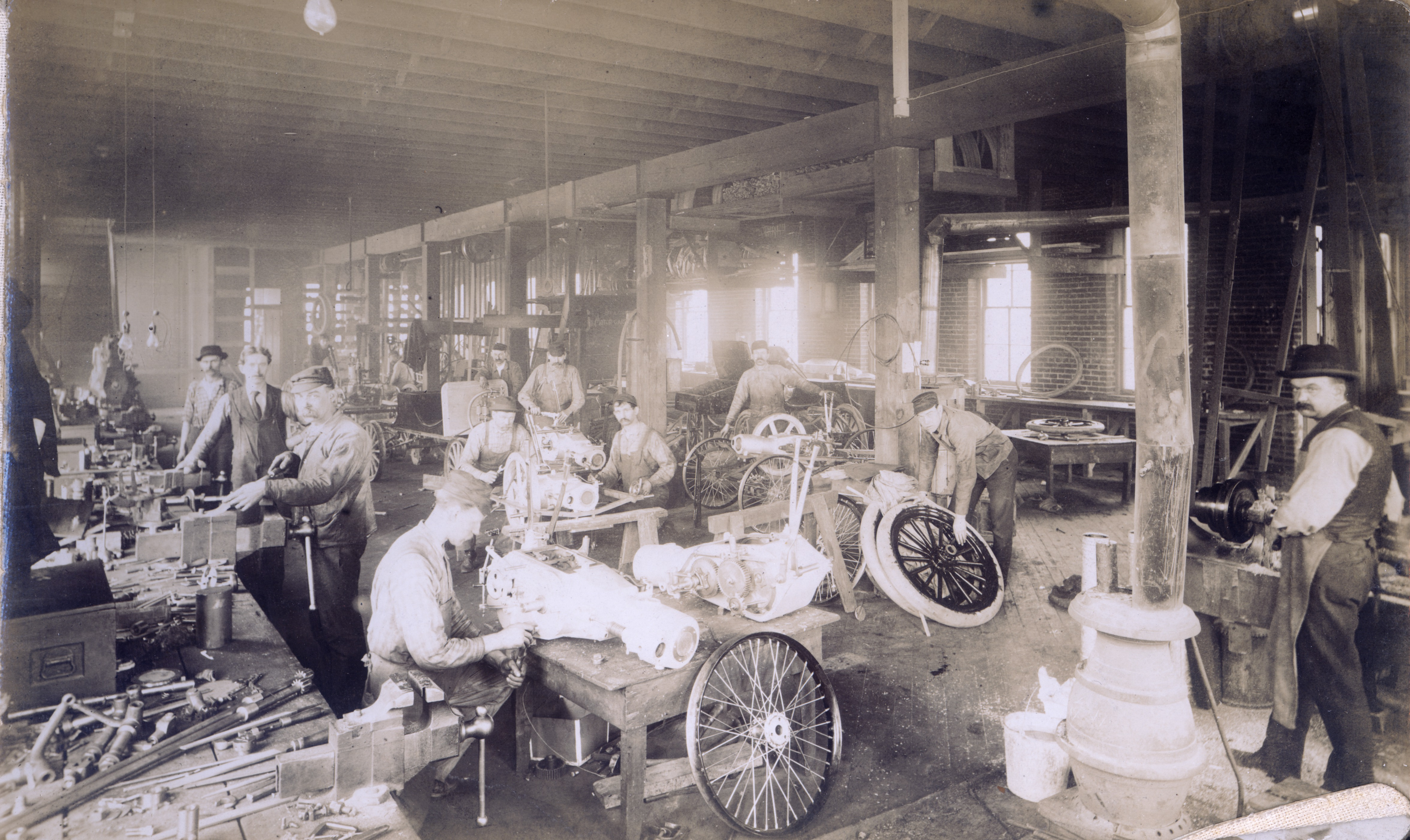
Workers assembling transmissions at St. Louis Motor Carriage Company factory

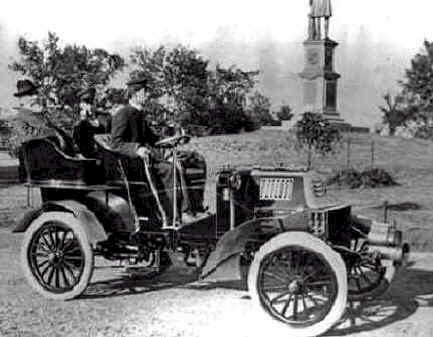
George Dorris and John French in a 1903 St. Louis tonneau

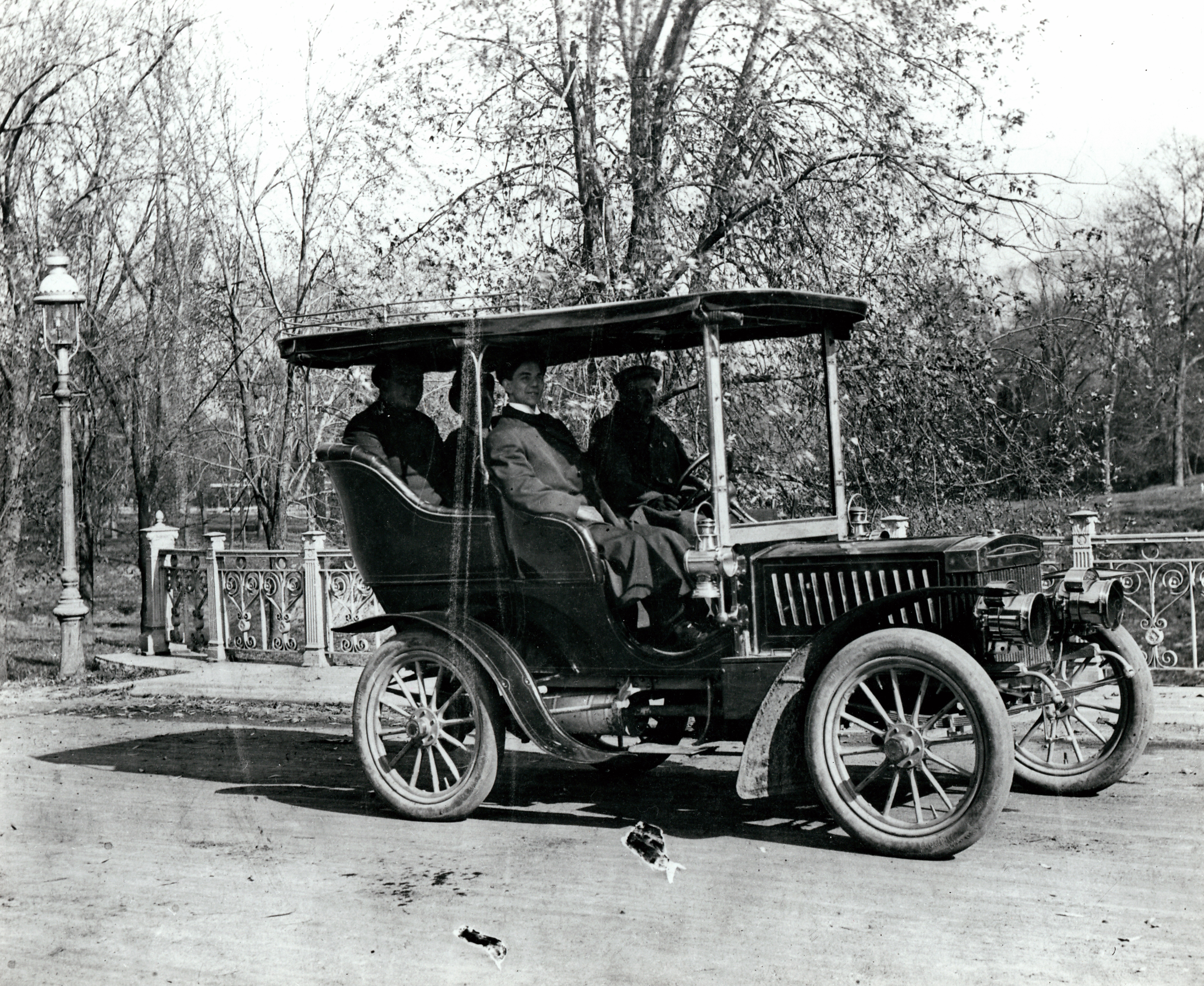
Jesse French Sr. at the wheel of a 1904 St. Louis

== See also ==
- Dorris Motors Corporation
