= Astram =

Astram may refer to:

- Astram Line, rubber-tired transit system in Hiroshima, Japan
- Astra (weapon), supernatural weapon in Hinduism
- Astram (film), 2006 Indian Telugu-language film

== See also ==
- Astra (disambiguation)
- Asthram (disambiguation)
