= 1907 Dorris Motor Car Company Building =

- U.S. National Register of Historic Places
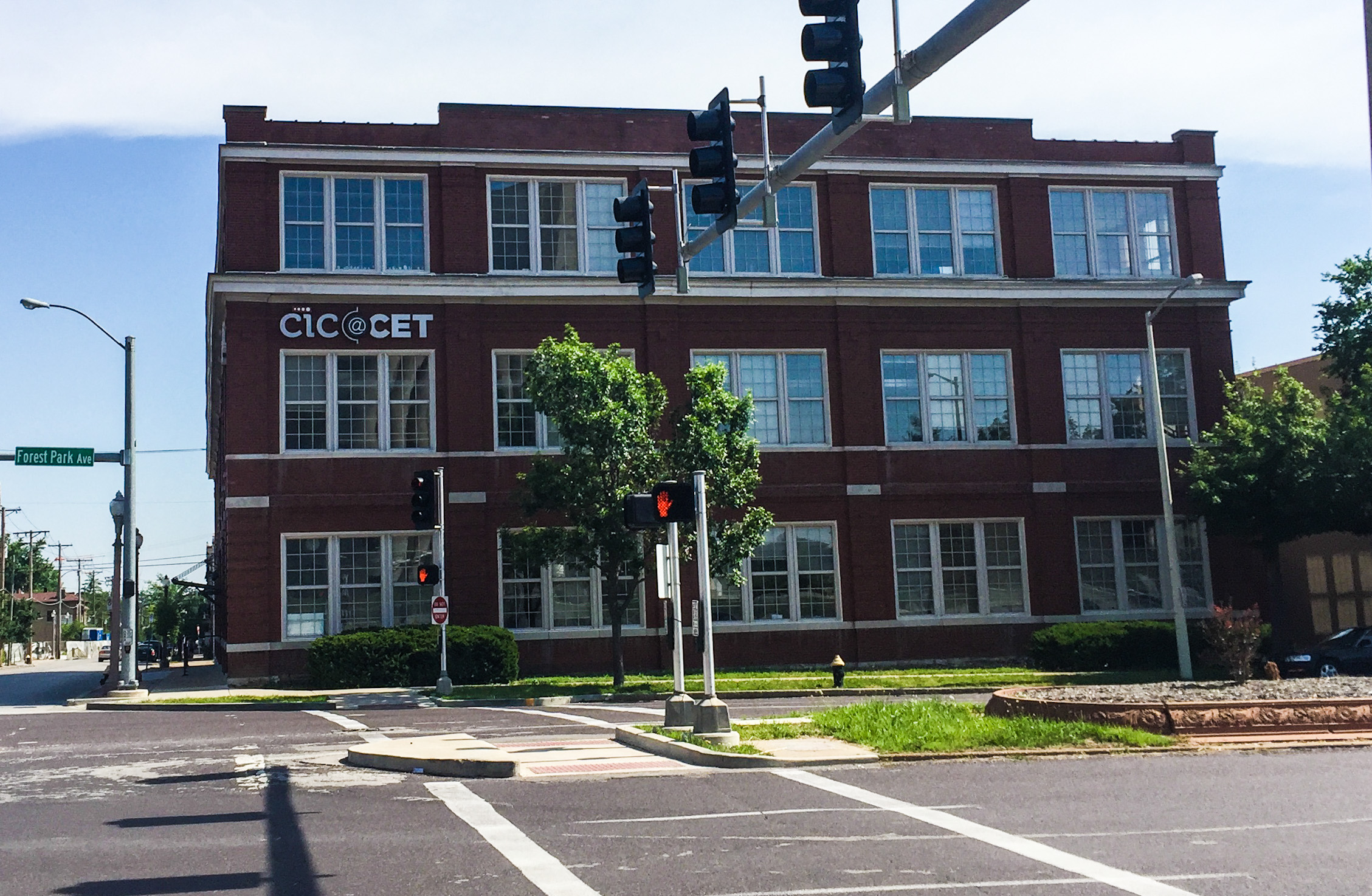

- Location within St. Louis Location within Missouri
- Location: 4063 Forest Park Avenue; St. Louis, MO, United States
- Coordinates: 38°38′10.48″N 90°14′48.23″W
- Area: less than one acre
- Built: 1907
- Architect: John L. Wees
- Architectural style: Early Commercial
- NRHP reference No.: 00000084

The 1907 Dorris Motor Car Company Building is a factory and industrial warehouse located at what is now 4059 – 4065 Forest Park Avenue in the Central West End neighborhood of St. Louis, Missouri. The building was originally constructed in 1907 as an automobile factory for the Dorris Motor Car Company and was modified in 1909 with the addition of a third story. It was the headquarters and manufacturing facility for the company until 1926, and the company played a significant role in the establishment of St. Louis as an automotive assembly and parts manufacturing center. It was listed on the National Register of Historic Places on February 10, 2000.

In 1926, the Dorris Motor Car Company officially went out of business, but the building has seen subsequent use. It held the Brauer Brothers Manufacturing Company's shoe factory for many years. After the Brauer Brothers Manufacturing Company moved out, the space was used for retail purposes by a furniture store. It then sat vacant for years. In 2004, it was renovated for use by the Center for Emerging Technologies, a startup incubator that is now called the CIC@CET. The building is undergoing further renovation today for continued use by the CIC@CET.
