= The Beethoven Conservatory =

Historic building in St. Louis, Missouri

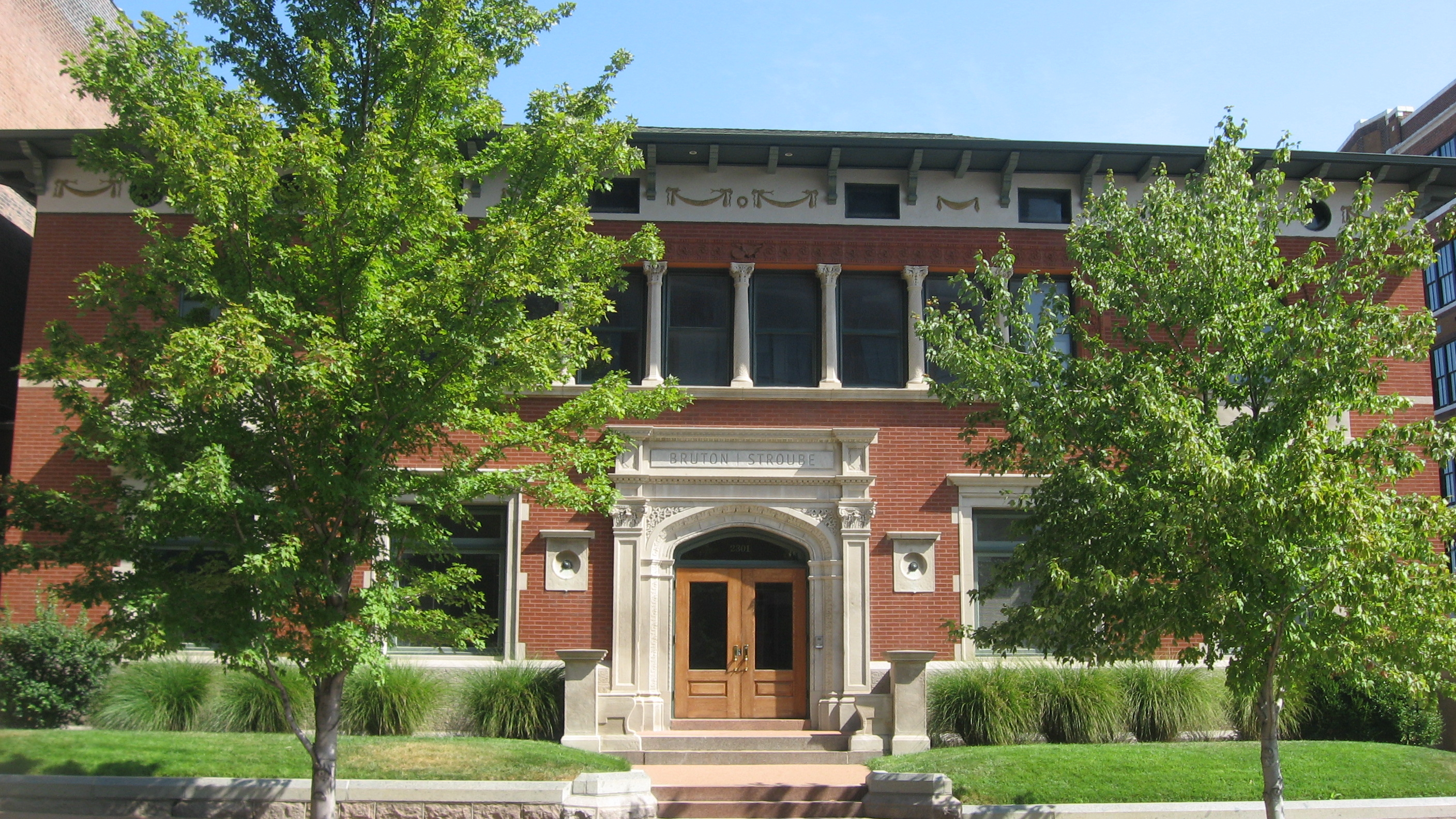
Front of The Beethoven Conservatory

The Beethoven Conservatory is a former music conservatory and historic building associated with that school in St. Louis, Missouri. The music conservatory, named after the composer Ludwig van Beethoven, was established in 1871 and remained active as a school of higher education in music until it closed in 1936 during the Great Depression. The historic building was designed by architect John Ludwig Wees and is located at 2301 Locust St. It was built for the music school in 1891 and was the home of the Beethoven Conservatory until the school moved to new premises in 1905. In 1913, the building was purchased by the Otis Elevator Company. In 1989, the building was added to the National Register of Historic Places, and then it was used by the Cordes Printing Company.

== Music conservatory ==
The Beethoven Conservatory was established in 1871 by August Waldauer, Herman Lawitzky, and a musician named Mr. Williams. It closed in 1936. The St Louis Amateur Orchestra was organized at The Beethoven Conservatory in 1893 and was later renamed the St Louis Orchestra Club in 1909.

=== Alumni ===
- Dorothy Morton
