= University of Canberra Firebirds =

- First season: 1993
- Location: Canberra, ACT, Australia
- Stadium: Greenway Oval
- League: ACT Gridiron League
- Colors: Red and Yellow
- Bowl record: 10–7 (.588)

Conference championships
- 10; 1994, 2005, 2006, 2007, 2008, 2010, 2011, 2016, 2017, 2018

Uniforms
- Website: ucfirebirds.com.au

The University of Canberra Firebirds, since re-branded as the University of Canberra Stars, are an American football club established to compete in the ACT Gridiron competition in 1993.

Based in the Belconnen area in the northern part of Canberra, the Firebirds were one of five clubs originally formed for the seniors competition.

Funding and support by the University of Canberra Union resulted in the club adopting the organisation's colours – yellow, red and blue. The original playing strip consisted of yellow jerseys and yellow helmets.

The first UC Firebirds squad (1993).

The Firebirds re-branded as the University of Canberra Stars as part of a university-wide re-brand of sports teams. The primary colours are white, blue and black.

The Firebirds have won the most championships in ACT Gridiron history with 10 Capital Bowl victories from 17 appearances. The club has also won 11 minor premierships by having the best regular season win-loss record (1994, 1997, 2000, 2004, 2006, 2007, 2010, 2011, 2016, 2017, 2018).

The Firebirds are nine-time winners of the Charity Bowl (2001, 2006–08, 2011–12, 2016–18), which is annually held in the first week of the season between the previous season's winners of the Capital Bowl and Charity Bowl. If one team holds both trophies, the opponent is the Capital Bowl runner-up.

During this period, the Firebirds Junior team won 13 ACT championships in 1996, 1997, 1999, 2000, 2004, 2005, 2006, 2013, 2014, 2015, 2016, 2017 and 2020. The 1999 championship was as the University Rockets – a joint venture with the ACT Astros side then competing in the NSW Gridiron League.

The Firebirds only fielded a junior team in 2020 – citing reduced player numbers caused by COVID-19 disruptions and increased league fees as the reason for no men's team. The club has yet to re-enter a team in ACT Gridiron competition, but fielded a women's team in the 2022 Gridiron NSW competition. The team qualified for the playoffs, but lost in the semi-final to the eventual-champion Northern Sydney Rebels.

== The championship seasons ==
The Firebirds' first championship came in 1994 when it finished the regular season with an 8–0 record, followed by a 28–0 victory over the Belconnen Thunderbolts in Capital Bowl II. The dominance of the team was reflected in the fact that the offence scored more than 300 points, while the defence conceded only 20 points throughout the regular season. The Firebirds recorded six shutouts, with a seventh in the Capital Bowl. Quarterback Chris Laughlin was named ACT Gridiron MVP, while Tight End Bryan Hann was named Team MVP. Both were exchange students from the United States. The side was coached by John Etminan.

Paul Teede(23) in Capital Bowl XXIII

An 11-year championship drought ensued before the Firebirds claimed a second title in 2005 with a 15–14 overtime win against the Astros in Capital Bowl XIII. With the score tied at 7-all at the end of regulation, the Astros scored a touchdown on the first drive of overtime, with the successful PAT giving them a 14–7 lead. The Firebirds responded with a 10-yard touchdown run by slot receiver Andrew Jackson. Head coach Shawn Willis decided to go for a two-point conversion. Running a counter to the right, running back Travis Ford cut back up the middle and into the endzone for the winning points. Ford was named Capital Bowl MVP with 40 carries for 121 yards and one touchdown.

The Firebirds followed up in 2006 with the club's second perfect season, posting an 8–0 regular-season record and a 19–7 victory over the Tuggeranong Tornadoes in Capital Bowl XIV. Travis Ford won a second consecutive Capital Bowl MVP with 212 rushing yards and one touchdown on 23 carries. He also recorded six total tackles and one interception as middle linebacker.

A third consecutive title came from the Firebirds' 12–6 double-overtime win over the Tornadoes in Capital Bowl XV. With less than three minutes remaining, the Firebirds were trailing 6–0 and faced with a fourth down and five near midfield. Quarterback Luke Job successfully ran an option left and pitched to running back Travis Ford, who ran for a 10-yard gain. After Job scrambled for another first down, he hit receiver Mark Skinner with a 21-yard touchdown pass to tie the score. Job won the game in the second period of overtime with a 20-yard scramble for touchdown around the left end.

Firebirds Head Coach Shawn Willis became the first coach in ACT Gridiron history to win four consecutive championships in 2008 as the Firebirds beat the Tornadoes 21–6 in Capital Bowl XVI. The Firebirds lost league-leading rusher and 2008 ACT Gridiron MVP Jeremy Milne to a broken leg early in the second quarter when leading 7–6, but used touchdown runs by back-up David Hicks and fullback Reece Cheater to secure the win. Firebirds quarterback Luke Job was named Capital Bowl MVP.

The Firebirds' sixth championship came with a 28–11 win over the Woden Valley Gladiators to close out a 9–1 season in 2010. Jeremy Milne was named Capital Bowl XVIII MVP after racking up 157 total yards (133 rushing, 24 receiving) and one touchdown off 17 touches (13 carries, four receptions). Quarterback Luke Job threw two touchdown passes to receiver Beau Kennett and scored another on a one-yard sneak. Linebackers Reece Cheater and James Case each recorded 10 solo tackles.

The club's record seventh title – and sixth in seven years – came the following season with an 18–12 win over the Gungahlin Wildcats in Capital Bowl XIX. Despite losing four-time ACT Gridiron MVP Jeremy Milne to an ankle injury in the second quarter, the Firebirds built an 18–0 lead with less than five minutes remaining. The Wildcats scored two late touchdowns, but it wasn't enough to snatch the win. Free safety and back-up running back Ian Lanham was named Capital Bowl MVP after rushing for 160 yards and a touchdown on 18 carries, in addition to making three solo tackles. Milne ran for 80 yards and a touchdown on 10 carries before his injury.

An eighth championship came when the Firebirds ended the four-year reign of the Central Spears with a 34–14 win over the Spears in Capital Bowl XXIV. Running back Brent Williams gained 200 yards on 27 carries and scored four touchdowns, the first of which was a 65-yard scoring run on the first offensive snap of the game. With a 14–8 lead at halftime, the Firebirds defence held the Spears on the first drive of the third quarter, forcing a punt from the Spears' 17-yard line. Defensive tackle Sam Jones broke through to block the kick, with defensive end Sandy Maskell-Knight diving on the ball in the end zone for a touchdown and a 21–8 lead. Williams scored the final two touchdowns, while also recording a fourth-quarter sack while playing defensive tackle. Quarterback Luke Job finished 8-of-11 passing for 66 yards, and carried four times for 31 yards – three of them first downs. Julian Ingall caught six passes for 43 yards. Nathan Long became the third head coach to guide the club to an undefeated championship season.

The Firebirds capped their second consecutive undefeated season with a 56–0 win over the Tuggeranong Tornadoes in Capital Bowl XXV. A 49-point first half highlighted the record-breaking performance, which included the highest score in a championship game and largest margin of victory. James Thornhill was named Most Valuable Player after scoring four touchdowns. He ran for 161 yards and three touchdowns on only six carries, while also returning an interception 94 yards for the game's first touchdown. Quarterback Luke Job passed for 158 yards and three touchdowns (completing 7 of 9 passes), ran six yards for another touchdown and kicked eight extra points. The Firebirds defence forced four turnovers, with a fifth occurring on a special teams play, and recorded seven tackles for a loss and one quarterback sack. The win capped a dominant season in which the team scored 376 points in nine games while conceding only 20. Opponents were shut out in seven of those nine games. Firebirds captain Sam Babic retired after 21 seasons and nine Capital Bowl wins as a player.

A third consecutive championship following an undefeated season came with a 29–6 win over the Centurions in Capital Bowl XXVI in November 2018. Receiver Shaquille Garner was named Capital Bowl MVP after catching two touchdown passes from Quarterback Luke Job, who also ran for a touchdown, a two-point conversion and kicked three extra points. Running back James Thornhill also ran for a TD as the Firebirds built a 22–6 half-time lead. The Capital Bowl success marked the club's 27th consecutive victory. Aruvin Karunakaran became the fourth head coach to guide the club to an undefeated championship season.

== Season records ==
Year	Regular season	Win	Loss	Tie	Rank	Head coach	Playoffs	Win	Loss	Result
2019		1	4	0	2nd	Aruvin Karunakaran		0	0	Runners-up
2018		8	0	0	1st	Aruvin Karunakaran		1	0	Champions
2017		8	0	0	1st	Nathan Long		1	0	Champions
2016		8	0	0	1st	Nathan Long		1	0	Champions
2015		6	2	0	2nd	Nathan Long		1	1	Runners-up
2014		8	2	0	2nd	Nathan Long		1	1	Runners-up
2013		3	6	1	4th	Shawn Willis				
2012		8	2	0	1st	Shawn Willis		0	1	Runners-up
2011		9	1	0	1st	Shawn Willis		1	0	Champions
2010		8	1	0	1st	Shawn Willis		1	0	Champions
2009		5	3	0	2nd	Shawn Willis		0	1	Semi-finalist
2008		6	2	0	2nd	Shawn Willis		2	0	Champions
2007		7	1	0	1st	Shawn Willis		1	0	Champions
2006		8	0	0	1st	Shawn Willis		1	0	Champions
2005		2	5	0	3rd	Shawn Willis		2	0	Champions
2004		7	1	1	1st	Shawn Willis		0	1	Runners-up
2003		4	5	0	3rd	Shawn Willis		0	1	Semi-finalist
2002		6	2	0	2nd	Shawn Willis		1	1	Runners-up
2001		2	7	0	4th	John Schofield (1–1), Shawn Willis (1–6)				
2000		9	0	0	1st	John Schofield		0	1	Runners-up
1999		1	7	0	3rd	Ross Dorward				
1998		3	4	0	2nd	Simon Clancy (1–0), Ross Dorward (2–4)		0	1	Semi-finalist
1997		6	3	0	1st	Simon Clancy		0	1	Runners-up
1996		–	–	–	–	No team entered				
1995										
1994		8	0	0	1st	John Etminan		1	0	Champions
1993		3	3	2	3rd	Ross Dorward		0	1	Semi-finalist

== Team MVPs ==
2018	James Thornhill	RB/S
2017	James Thornhill	RB/S
2016	Ian Lanham	RB/DE
2015	Ian Lanham	WR/DE
2014	Brent Williams	RB/LB
2013	Ian Lanham	RB/S
2012	Luke Job	QB
2011	Jeremy Milne	RB
2010	Ian Lanham	RB/TE/DE/DT
2009	Jeremy Milne	RB
2008	Jeremy Milne	RB
2007	Garry Coates	RB/WR/DB
2006	Luke Kominek (Job)	QB
2005	Chris Czerny	LG/DT
2004	Luke Kominek (Job)	QB
2003	Luke Kominek (Job)	QB
2002	Wayne Vickers	RB
2001	Chris Czerny	T/DL
2000	Simon Davis	WR/QB/KR
1999	Aaron Froud (offense)	RT
	Tim Silver (defense)	SS
1998	Nathan Long (offense)	RB
	Tim Silver (defense)	SS
1997	Adam Shain (offense)	RB
	Mike Chambers (defense)	LB

== Representative honours ==
A number of Firebirds have gone on to represent Australia at both a Junior and Senior level.

Current Firebirds captain Sam Babic represented Australia in 2001 and 2003. He was selected as a center for the national team after his performances at the Gridiron Australia national championships in both years.

Travis Ford and Garry Coates were members of the Australian under 18s squad that played games against US all-star squads at the Down Under Bowl on the Gold Coast in 2004.

David Hicks, John Tolsher, Ben Collett, Garry Coates, David Wilkins and Jason Ray were all named in the Australian under 18s side following the 2006 National Junior Championships on the Gold Coast.

Sunny Dhindsa, John Tolsher, Sam Zielke, David Wilkins, Matt Lang, and Beau Kennett were all selected for the Australian Outback Junior Representative Squad that toured in Arizona and California in August 2008.

Linebacker James Tolsher was part of the Australian team for the World Cup qualifying match against New Zealand played in Canberra in January 2009. New Zealand won the match 12–7 to secure a place in the International Federation of American football 2009 Junior World Cup.

James Thornhill and Hayden Clark were selected in the Australian Outback team to contest the International Federation of American football 2016 Junior World Cup in China.

== Statistical leaders ==
Rushing yards

Career:

6,233 – Jeremy Milne
4,929 – Ian Lanham
4,190 – Brent Williams
3,102 – Andrew Jackson

Season:

1,646 – Jeremy Milne (2011)
1,638 – Brent Williams (2014)
1,533 – Ian Lanham (2013)

Game:

297 – Adam Shain (1997)
248 – Jeremy Milne (2011)
238 – Ian Lanham (2013)
238 – Ian Lanham (2013)

Passing yards

Career:

10,366 – Luke Job
807 – Matt Cottrell

Season:

1,328 – Luke Job (2015)
1,192 – Luke Job (2017)
1,149 – Luke Job (2012)

Game:

266 – Luke Job (2015)
230 – Luke Job (2009)
229 – Luke Job (2017)

Receiving yards

Career:

1,392 – Mat Hatcher
1,125 – Ian Lanham
1,020 – Beau Kennett

Season:

550 – Matt Hatcher (2004)
517 – Beau Kennett (2012)
471 – Sandy Maskell-Knight (2017)

Game:

118 – Craig Sconce (2006)
113 – Tim Simpson (2011)
107 – Ronnie Carr (1997)

Receptions

Career:

87 – Ian Lanham
83 – Beau Kennett
81 – Matt Hatcher

Season:

35 – Beau Kennett (2012)
34 – Ian Lanham (2015)
31 – Luke Freeman (2014)

Touchdowns

Career:

74 – Jeremy Milne
65 – Brent Williams
61 – Ian Lanham
43 – Luke Job

Season:

23 – Brent Williams (2014)
21 – Brent Williams (2015)
18 – Jeremy Milne (2011)

Game:

5 – Jeremy Milne (2010)
5 – Brent Williams (2014)
5 – Ian Lanham (2014)

Tackles (combined)

Career:

413 – Tim Silver*
259 – Dan Simpson
253 – Sam Babic

Season:

73 – Dan Simpson (2007)
64 – Reece Cheater (2011)
58 – Dan Simpson (2009)

Sacks

Career:

14.5 – Chris Czerny
11 – Sam Babic
8.5 – Brendan Morrissey
8.5 – Ian Lanham

Season:

8 – Scott Hare (2017)
5 – Dan Jackson (2017)
4 – Chris Czerny (2002)
4 – Sam Babic (2002)

Interceptions

Career:

17 – Ian Lanham
11 – Dan Simpson
9 – Jonathan McCaskill
9 – Tim Silver
9 – Laurence Marin

Season:

6 – Joel Hennessy (2008)
5 – Dan Simpson (2004)
5 – Dan Simpson (2006)
5 – Jonathan McCaskill (2006)
5 – Ian Lanham (2014)

Game:

4 – Jonathan McCaskill (2006)
3 – Dan Simpson (2006)
3 – Nathan Long (2007)

(*) indicates that a player’s record may be higher and is likely to be adjusted as pre-1997 interception and pre-1998 tackle statistics become available.
