= Astra Blair =

British opera singer, agent, and charity fundraiser (born 1932)

Astra Blair (born 2 September 1932) is a British former opera singer, agent, and charity fundraiser.

== Life and career ==
Blair was born Margaret Jean Waugh in India and educated in England and West Africa. After finishing school Blair took up a scholarship at The Royal Academy of Music with singing as her principal study. Her professional debut was as a mezzo-soprano with Glyndebourne Festival Opera; she later joined the Sadlers Wells Opera, which became the English National Opera. In 1954 she married the opera singer Raimund Herincx and had three children. In 1972 she established Music and Musicians Artists' Management, an operatic and concert agency in London.

Early in her musical career Blair and her husband converted part of their Bedfordshire home into a small concert hall and founded the Quinville Concerts Trust to raise funds for disabled children. Sir Colin Davis and Sir Charles Groves became joint presidents of the Trust and for 13 years international musicians, singers and actors took part in its concerts, raising money to provide equipment, specialised transport, holidays and leisure activities to children with disabilities. The Trust, with support from British Steel Corporation, helped to finance and develop the Quinville caliper for disabled children, which was used at Stoke Mandeville Hospital.

Together with Line Renaud, founder of the French Association des Artistes contre le SIDA, Blair organized a "Gala Franco-Brittanique" at the Théâtre des Champs-Élysées in Paris to raise money for the fight against AIDS. Much of the money raised was donated to the newly founded National Aids Trust. Blair founded the British charity "Association of Artists Against Aids" with her colleague, the English tenor Peter Jeffes; she attracted as patrons June Gordon, Marchioness of Aberdeen and Temair, Kate Adie, Shirley Bassey, Jane Glover, Jonathan Miller, Michael Parkinson, Jeffrey Tate and Fay Weldon. Following the Paris gala, Blair was asked, as representative of the Association of Artists Against Aids to organise a Royal Gala at the Drury Lane Theatre benefit for the National Aids Trust. Blair devoted the gala to the music of Stephen Sondheim, who attended as guest of honour. The show, titled Being Alive, featured international artists, film stars, musicians, TV personalities, opera singers, and conductors, raising substantial funds for the Milestone AIDS Hospice in Edinburgh. Blair subsequently organized five other major fundraisers and oversaw the recording of An Anthology of English Song by leading artists from the Royal Opera House, also in support of the Milestone AIDS Hospice. Additionally, Blair raised funds for Great Ormond Street Children’s Hospital and Queen Charlotte’s Children’s Hospital, serving three years on the organizing committee for the Queen Charlotte’s Birthday Ball, including one year as vice-president.
