= Astra (Isauria) =

Town of ancient Isauria, inhabited in Roman times

Coordinates: 37°03′25″N 32°21′27″E

Astra was a town of ancient Isauria, inhabited in Roman times. The name does not occur among ancient authors but is inferred from epigraphic and other evidence.

Its site is located near Tamaşalık, Asiatic Turkey, where an ancient theatre has been found.
