= Astro (Chilean band) =

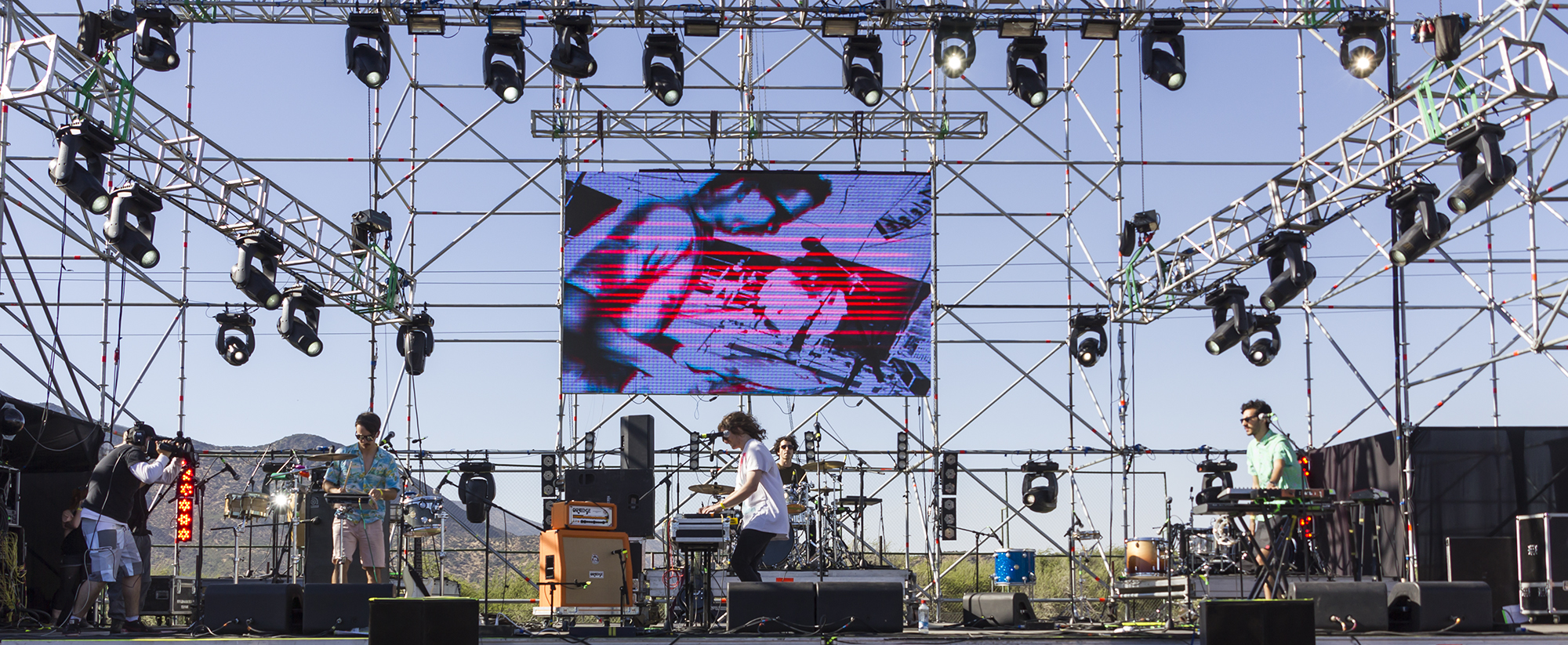
- Astro - Festival Primavera Fauna 2011

Background information
- Origin: Santiago, Chile
- Genres: Indie rock, indietronica, dream pop, neo-psychedelia, experimental rock
- Years active: 2008–Today
- Label: Nacional Records
- Spinoff of: Moustache!
- Members: Andrés Nusser; Octavio Caviares; Nicolás Arancibia; Daniel Varas

Astro is a Chilean indie rock band from Santiago de Chile, formed in 2008.

== History ==
=== Formation (2008–2009) ===
Andrés Nusser and Octavio Caviares met at the Escuela Moderna de Música y Danza in Chile where they were enrolled as students. The other members knew each other from the DJ scene in Santiago. The band formed in 2008 when Nusser agreed to perform at a ski resort in southern Chile in exchange for a free 3-day stay there. Unfortunately, Nusser did not actually have a band, so he formed one with Caviares and members of Moustache!, a duo made up of Nicolás Arancibia and Daniel Varas. The band cites Peter Gabriel, David Bowie, Genesis, and MGMT as early influences on their music.

In 2009, the band released its first EP titled Le Disc de Astrou. The next year the band performed at Vive Latino, the Mexican music festival.

=== Astro (2011–2013) ===
The quartet released its first full-length album, Astro, in 2011. Despite being entirely in Spanish, the album received attention from American music critics. NPR Music featured the album as part of its First Listen series in 2012. Jasmine Garsd called Astro one of her favorite albums, referring to it as "infectiously cheery, lighthearted and danceable." She described them as musical cognates with American bands such as MGMT, Animal Collective, and Passion Pit.

In 2013, Astro performed at Lollapalooza Chicago, Primavera Sound, Mysteryland, and many others festivals.

The song "Panda" was featured on the soundtrack of FIFA 13, the EA Sports video game.

=== Departure of Andrés Nusser (2016) ===
In May 2016, Andrés Nusser announced that he would leave the band and that they would go into an indefinite hiatus after their tour on Mexico. Recently in 2020 Astro released a new single.

== Members ==
- Andrés Nusser - vocals, guitar, keyboards
- Octavio Caviares - drums, percussion
- Nicolás Arancibia (Lego Moustache) - bass, keyboards, percussion
- Daniel Varas (Zeta Moustache) - keyboards, percussion

== Discography ==
Albums

- Astro (2011)
- Chicos de la luz (2015)

EPs

- Le disc de Astrou (2009)

Singles

- "Maestro distorsión " (2009)
- "Ciervos" (2012)
- "Colombo" (2012)
- "Panda" (2013)
- "Hawaii" (2013)
- "Manglares" (2014)
- "Caribbean" (2015)
- "Druida" (2015)
- "Warrior" (2016)
