= Astra Edwards =

Trinidad and Tobago table tennis player (born 1981)

Astra Rosetta Edwards-Bennett (born October 30, 1981) is a Trinidadian table tennis player.

Born in Port of Spain, Edwards came to prominence in 1997, becoming the top junior female player in Trinidad and Tobago. That year she won the Silver Bowl, the National Junior Championship, and the Port of Spain Classified B Division. In international competitions, she won a silver medal at the Puerto Rico Federation Championships in the junior girls' doubles event with Shane Bhopa, three bronzes at the Caribbean Federation Championships in the girls' singles event, team event, and mixed doubles with Terrence Kallicharran. At the Barbados Championships she took silver in the girls' doubles with Bhopa and a bronze in the singles and mixed doubles, again with Kallicharran.

As an adult, she participated at the 2006 Central American and Caribbean Games and the 2007 Caribbean Tennis Championship. Astra has also won the National Petroleum Services Singles Tournament at the PowerGen Sports Club in Penal on 1 November 2008. Astra first beat Avernelle Abraham 8-11, 11-8, 11-2, 11-3 in the semi-finals and then went on to beat Kristin Scipio 10-12, 11-6, 11-6, 11-5 in the finals to capture the title. With this victory, Astra also reclaimed her position in the Trinidad and Tobago National Table tennis squad, and will travelled with them to the regional games in Jamaica in December 2008.

Edwards' mother, Verna, and sister, Aleena, are also competitive table tennis players.

Edwards' legacy lives on in her daughter Imani Edwards-Taylor who is currently ranked as the number 1 Women's table tennis player in Trinidad and Tobago.
