= Astro (album) =

Studio album by Astro
- Released: 6 November 2011
- Recorded: 2010–11, Estudios Triana
- Genre: Indie pop, neo-psychedelia, indietronica
- Label: Discos Río Bueno; Feria Music
- Producer: Andrés Nusser

Astro chronology
Le disc de Astrou (2009)	Astro (2011)	Chicos de la luz (2015)

Singles from Astro
- 1. "Ciervos" Released: 2012; 2. "Colombo" Released: 2012; 3. "Panda" Released: 2013; 4. "Hawaii" Released: 2013

Astro is the first full-length album (after the EP Le disc of Astrou) by Chilean indie band Astro, released in 2011. The first single from the album was "Ciervos" and followed "Colombo", "Panda" and "Manglares".

This album was chosen by National Public Radio among the 50 discs of 2012.

== Track listing ==
All tracks written by Andrés Nusser, except where noted.

1. Ciervos (Deer)
2. Coco (Coconut)
3. Colombo
4. Druida de las nubes (Druid of the clouds)
5. Panda
6. Miu-Miu
7. Manglares (Mangroves)
8. Mira, está nevando en las pirámides (Look, it's snowing in the pyramids)
9. Volteretas (Tumbles)
10. Pepa
11. Nueces de Bangladesh (Nuts of Bangladesh)
12. Miu-Miu reaparece (Miu-Miu reappears)

== Personnel ==
Astro

- Andrés Nusser – vocals, guitar
- Octavio Caviares – drums
- Lego Moustache – keyboards, percussion
- Zeta Moustache – keyboards, bass

Production

- Andrés Nusser – producer, recording and mixing
- Chalo González – mixing and mastering
- Cristóbal Carvajal – recording
- Ignacio Soto – recording
