= Astra (1930 automobile) =

The Astra was a Belgian car made by Automobiles Astra in 1930. It is considered a textbook example of car design piracy, as the 1100 cc S.C.A.P.-engined car that made its debut at the 1930 Brussels Motor Show was an almost exact copy of the Tracta. It never went into production, and the projected 6- and 8-cylinder versions were most likely never built.
