= Astro Arena =

Astro Arena may refer to:

- Astro Arena (Houston), now NRG Arena, a sports centre in Reliant Park, Houston, Texas
- Astro Arena (TV channel), a sports TV channel on the Malaysian satellite television Astro
