= Dorris Motors Corporation =

Defunct US car company

Dorris Motor Car Company
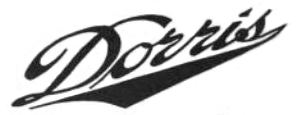
- Company type: Automobile Manufacturing
- Industry: Automotive
- Genre: sedans, trucks
- Founded: 1906
- Founder: George Preston Dorris and John L. French
- Defunct: 1926
- Fate: Bankruptcy
- Headquarters: St. Louis, Missouri, United States
- Area served: United States
- Products: Automobiles; Automotive parts
- Owner: George Preston Dorris

The Dorris Motor Car Company was founded by George Preston Dorris in 1906. Born in Nashville, Tennessee, Dorris had built an experimental gasoline car circa 1896–1897 in his family's bicycle shop. He moved to St. Louis, Missouri, where he and John L. French founded the St. Louis Motor Company. Dorris served as chief engineer.

When French moved to Peoria, Illinois, in 1905, Dorris quit the firm and founded the Dorris Motor Car Company soon after. French and his new St. Louis Motor Carriage Company quickly foundered.

== History ==
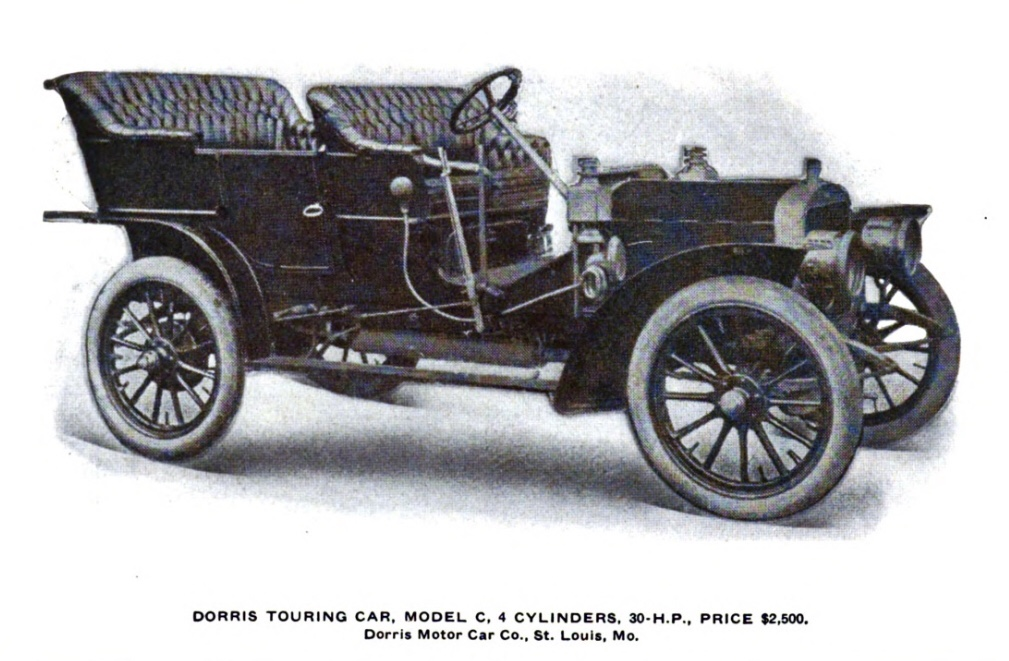
Dorris Model C (1908)

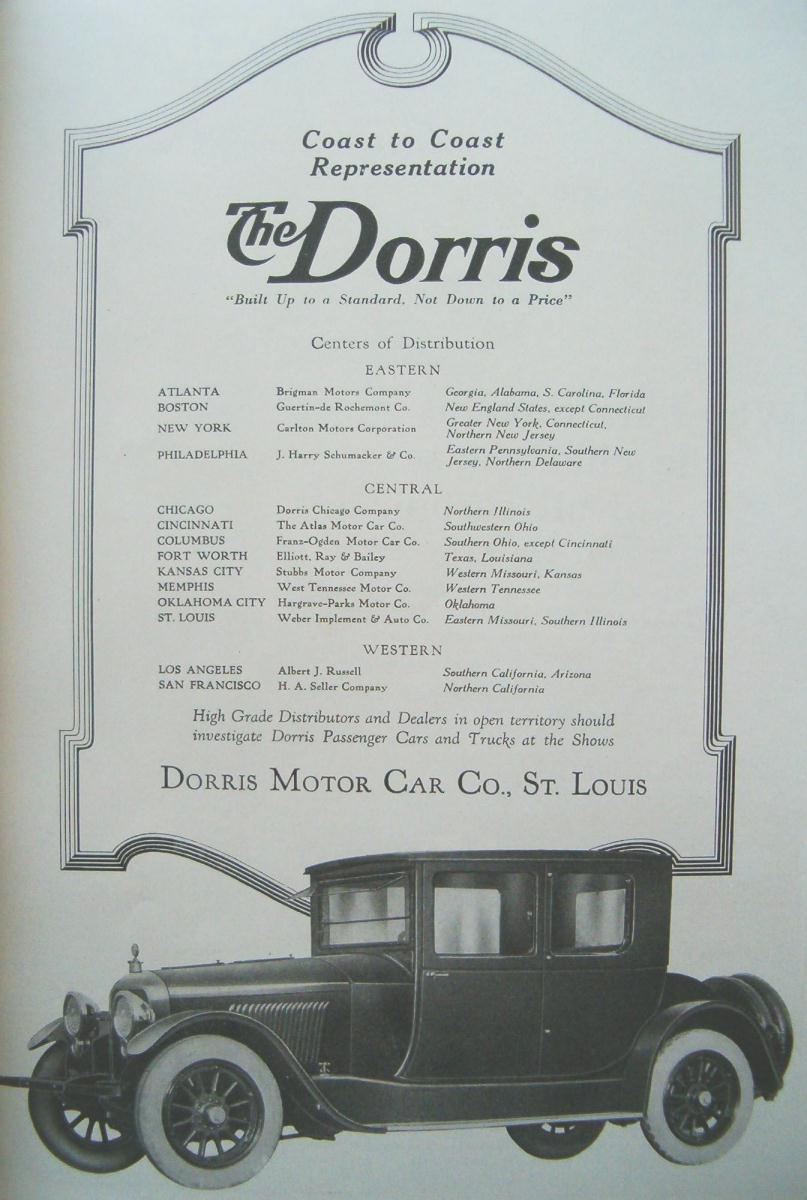
1921 Dorris Model 6-80

Dorris is credited with developing and patenting the float carburetor, an innovation that was used for decades. For much of the Dorris production life the slogan was "Built up to a standard, not down to a price."

=== Production vehicle ===
The company took over the original St. Louis Motor Company plant and began production there. The first vehicle had a four-cylinder engine with 101-inch (2,600 mm) wheel-base, which took the New York Automobile Show by storm in January 1906. Over time, Dorris' cars became more powerful, graduating from a four- to six-cylinder engine, and increasing nearly 30 inches (760 mm) in the wheelbase. The engines were of the OHV design, unusual at the time. The price tag of these cars was nearly $7,000.

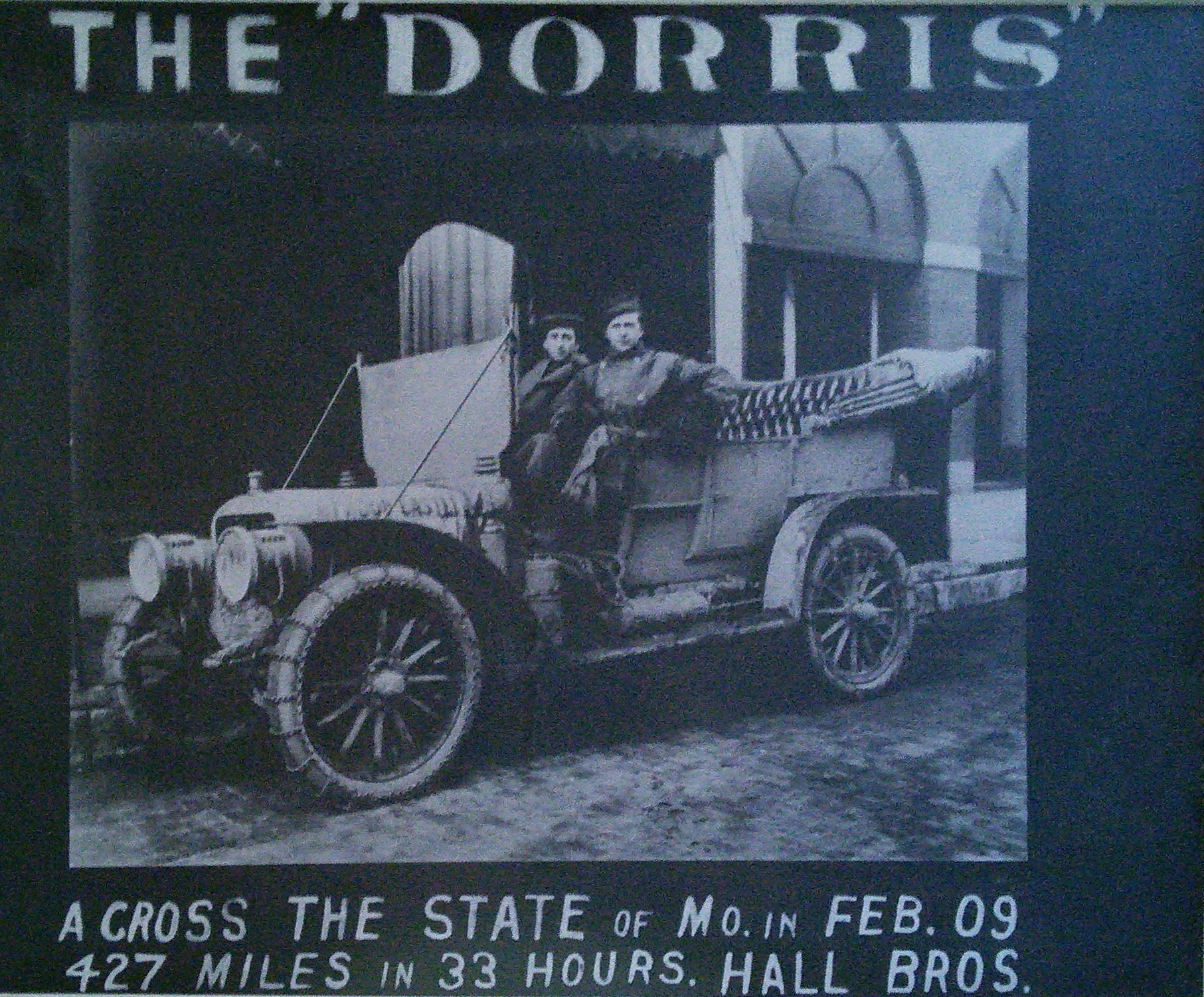
Hall Brothers In Dorris Auto after 33 hour record setting time across the state of Missouri.

In 1909, Guy Herring Hall Sr. and his brother, George Hall, drove a Dorris across Missouri, setting a record of 33 hours.

Truck production began before World War I. In 1917, the capital stock expanded by $700,000 to $1,000,000, enabling expansion of the company. Company president, H.B. Krenning stepped aside "because of needed rest" and W.R. Colcord assumed his duties.

== Production models ==
- Dorris Model F Touring Car

=== Astra acquisition ===
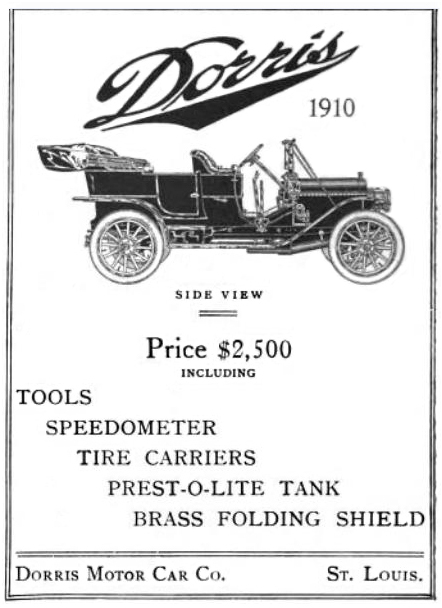
Dorris automobile advertisement 1909

In 1920, Dorris acquired the Astra (1920 automobile), a competing St. Louis auto manufacturer, and re-organized as Dorris Motors Corporation.

In 1923 rumors abounded that the Dorris, Haynes and Winton companies would merge, but this merger did not come to fruition.

=== Company failure ===
1923 signalled the last full year of production for Dorris Motors. Production fell to a standstill, although the "practically hand-built" Dorris cars were built to special order until 1926 when the company went bankrupt.

== See also ==
- 1907 Dorris Motor Car Company Building
- List of defunct United States automobile manufacturers
