= Astra (1920 automobile) =

American automobile manufactured in 1920

The Astra was an American automobile manufactured in 1920. The car was built by a subsidiary concern of Dorris Motors Corporation, and was shown that year in its native St. Louis, Missouri. It featured a 108-inch (2,700 mm) wheelbase, a Le Roi four-cylinder engine, and a slightly pointed radiator. Some five or ten units were built before the company failed in June 1920.

== See also ==
- List of defunct United States automobile manufacturers
