= Astros (chocolate) =

Brand of confectionery by Cadbury

Astros were first launched in 1997 by Cadbury in the United Kingdom, Canada, Ireland, the United States and South Africa as a rival to Nestlé Smarties, and Mars M&M's in the US. The confectionery can be described as a candy-coated chocolate with a biscuit centre. They have since been discontinued in the UK, but are still sold in South Africa, and are available in 40g and 150g boxes. In Australia, they were marketed as Lunas.

== See also ==
- List of chocolate bar brands
