= Astra, Chubut =

Astra (Argentina)
- Town
- Interactive map of Astra (Argentina)
- Coordinates: 45°43′54.2″S 67°29′25.8″W
- Country: Argentina
- Province: Chubut Province
- Department: Escalante Department
- Municipio: Comodoro Rivadavia
- Time zone: UTC−3 (ART)

Astra is a town in Chubut Province in southern Argentina and a part of the city and municipality of Comodoro Rivadavia.

== History ==
Astra history dates back to 1912 as an Oil exploration site camp.

The start of Astra was the camp founded by the Astra Argentina Oil Trade Union around the first exploratory well that it tested in Lot 138 of Colonia Bóers, or Escalante, on lands belonging to the Du Plessis family, after having obtained 30 June 1912 the corresponding permit. Her first villager was Marta Eggeling, third daughter of Marta Lehrke's marriage and the head of survey Herman Eggeling. He was born on December 12, 1912, in a tin box with a canvas roof that had been improvised very close to the discovery pit of the union workers. 2

His great performance was born on December 15, 1916, after the successful extraction of oil, as a result it soon set up a camp of the oil company Astra and soon became an organized town under the oil. The neighborhood at its best came to have more than 1500 workers, many of them were entire populations of immigrants who lived in the gamelas. Since its arrival, the company built homes and even a park for the workers. The company acquired a total of 8,968 hectares since the beginning of the operation. Its constructions of the incipient «town» were made of wood and zinc sheets. The first building of material was the central kitchen, built in 1916 with stones carved by the same stonecutters who in 1917 gave their headquarters to the administration, a building that still dazzles at the entrance to the neighborhood.

In 1918 the German capital brick factory produced up to 59,000 bricks per month since that first year of operation. It consumed the lime obtained with the grinding of marine oysters that were obtained from Cerro la Caracola. These bricks molded the most picturesque buildings in the region as in Diadema Argentina . 3 In the neighborhood, this material was used for the town's power plant, some staff houses, the homes of hierarchical employees, the police station, the workshops and the party room with its bar-restaurant.

In 1922 Astra built his own school, relieving his population of shoeing for education.

Its brick factory, the oil company and its train station were key in 1925 for the construction of the San Jorge Lighthouse . 4 The company created its distillery that began operating in 1926 and by the end of the following year it was already possible to buy gasoline that was marketed in 10 or 15 liter cans. Years later the refinery would be destroyed by fire. 5 It depended on the company Astra, which started in 1912 . Its activity reaches the climax during the oil boom that lives in the region and since 1958; a state railways report claims that it has 1500 inhabitants. 6 Its growth stagnates and begins decline in the 1960s, when the company changes owners. The total exploration of 1,149 wells was recorded until the 1960s . It is precisely from that decade that the decline of the place began, given that many workers migrated to the urban area due to dismissal and distrust. 7

During the course of the 1970s the locality was dragged along with others, in a process where private oil companies and the state broke away from the administration of services in their camps (today neighborhoods). As a result, the administration passed into the hands of the municipality of Comodo, centralizing these camps and neighborhoods in the Northern Zone; which was imposed a political division into five districts and a popular neighborhood representation by Neighborhood Associations in 1972 . The town or locality happened to be since then one more district of Comodoro, but it was not part of its agglomerate until then. 8 Another destabilizing blow that helped depopulation was the closure of its station and total closure of the Comodoro Rivadavia Railroad in 1979

During the 1980s, he participated along with other neighborhoods in the northern zone of Comodoro in the failed attempt to municipalize Zona Norte, ending the separatist pretensions since then. In 1987 and was built thanks to contributions from YPF Paleontological Museum of Astra on one side of the National Route 3 . 9

On December 15, 2012, marks the centenary of the neighborhood so that a commemorative event is held in front of the first oil well held in that neighborhood, where municipal authorities and many families and people associated with Astra participated. In addition, the news that the neighborhood would be declared historical heritage of the city was revealed as it entered the city's file on December 4, 2012. During the year of its centennial, the recent nationalized YPF filmed part of its advertising spot in this locality, Diadema Argentina and the Oil Fields of YPF . Since its centenary until 2013 it has been working to make the neighborhood more touristy its circuit consists of a tour of the administration, the Well No. 1, the Church, the bar and the old cinema of the place, being the proposal to know what the life of the oil workers inside the camp. 10

Its image as a highly industrial zone is diluted with closed factories, dry and old trees, old services, lack of infrastructure and abandoned historical and cultural heritage buildings. Surviving by means of time survive the means of recreation of oil tankers like their cinema and their bar. Unfortunately, their park 11 and museum were abandoned by the company and they suffered major outrages both inside and outside their premises. 12

In spite of all the abandonments that was submitted throughout the Argentine economic history; the neighborhood still survives thanks to oil, as YPF maintains an important seat in the neighborhood. 13

== Population ==
With the fall of oil activity after the departure of its oil company the population has been declining or stagnant in 1957, it registered 1,500 inhabitants. had 219 inhabitants ( INDEC, 2001 ), which represented a decrease of 37.6% compared to 351 inhabitants ( INDEC, 1991 ) of the previous census, on that occasion 109 dwellings were computed. Among the causes of the exodus are the fall of the oil exploitation, the great distance to the Center Bº, lack of houses and comforts. The population is counting constant low in 1957 the railroad that crossed it had about 1500 inhabitants approximately and it added it to the total of the other localities, to extract a number of the amount of population that attended. Integrates the municipality of Comodoro. In 2001 it did not conform the agglomerate Comodoro Rivadavia - Rada Tilly, because it is very distant from the Bº Centro, about 20 km to the north. The expansion of the oil city led to found different neighborhoods in the vicinity of Astra to 11, 12, 14 and 17 kilometers away. This would enable, if this were to continue, the inclusion of Astra in the Comodoro agglomerate in the final data of the 2010 or the next census. In the National Census conducted in 2010 showed that the Astra neighborhood has 341 inhabitants, growing back its population after 20 years by 5.08%.

== Sports ==
Comodoro Rugby Club is located in Astra
