= ACT Gridiron =

Australian governing body of American football

- Sport: Gridiron
- Founded: 1993
- First season: 1993
- President: Tyler McShane
- No. of teams: 3
- Country: Australia
- Venues: Greenway Oval; Gungahlin Oval; Griffith Park
- Most recent champion: Gungahlin Wolves (3rd Title) (2025)
- Most titles: UC Firebirds (10 titles)
- Level on pyramid: Seniors; Women's; Juniors
- Domestic cup: Capital Bowl

American Football ACT formally known as ACT Gridiron or ACTG is the governing body for gridiron (American football) in the Australian Capital Territory, Australia. ACT Gridiron currently has three teams. The season culminates with the grand final, known as the Capital Bowl.

== History ==
Gridiron in the ACT began in 1990 with the formation of the Canberra Sabretooths Gridiron Club. In that year the Sabretooths played a number of full contact games against NSW gridiron teams before entering the NSW competition in 1991. The club played three seasons as members of the NSW League, winning the championship in 1994, their last year in the competition.

The ACT Gridiron League was formed in 1993 with five teams competing for the Capital Bowl trophy. In 2020, the League had three teams and welcomed its first female athlete playing in the Men's division, Daniela Stosic.

=== Original teams ===
The original senior teams were: the Belconnen Thunderbolts, the Tuggeranong Tornadoes, the University of Canberra Firebirds, the Tidbinbilla Space Cadets and the Queanbeyan Wolverines. As of 2022 sadly all of these teams have since folded.

After the NSW championship-winning season in 1994, the Sabretooths folded. A number of players joined with the remaining members of the Belconnen Thunderbolts and Tidbinbilla Space Cadets to form the Canberra Tigers, who won Capital Bowl III in the club's inaugural season.

A number of ex-Sabretooths went on to form the ACT Astros to continue an involvement in the NSW competition. The Astros had great success in the NSW League, winning one title in 1996 from appearances in four grand finals. In 2001, the ACT Astros were renamed the Astros and entered the ACT Competition after withdrawing from the NSWGFL, replacing the Canberra Tigers side which folded after the 2000 season. The Astros experienced immediate success, winning championships in each of their first four seasons and compiling a 28–1 record between 2001 and 2003. The club effectively ceased operation following the 2011 season. The foundation Queanbeyan Wolverines folded mid-way through the 1998 season, but another Queanbeyan-based team – named the Warriors – formed in 2000. After experiencing early success by making the playoffs in the club's first three years (including a Capital Bowl appearance in 2001), the Warriors folded early in the 2005 season.

=== Expansion ===
ACT Gridiron then welcomed two expansion teams in 2007 with the formation of the Centurions and the Gladiators. The Centurions were based in Canberra's central and eastern suburbs and established by Tuggeranong Tornadoes founder John Crispin, who coached the Tornadoes to four Capital Bowl triumphs. The Gladiators began training in the Woden Valley and Kambah area and were coached by Mike Whitesell, who was in charge of the Astros team that won the 1996 NSW league championship. A further addition was made in 2009, with the Gungahlin Wildcats incorporated to begin play in 2010. Based in Canberra's expanding northern suburbs, the Wildcats were founded by former Australian junior coach and two-time ACT Gridiron Coach of the Year John Ludvigson, with the assistance of Jim Smith. The Central Spears began play in 2012, effectively taking over the operation of the Astros club that was scheduled to fold. However, no Astros were part of the Spears' management, coaches and players. The Spears won the ACT Gridiron championship in their first year of existence.

The competition remained at six teams through 2014, before various clubs did not enter teams over the next several years. The Gladiators did not field a team in 2015, before returning to play in 2016 and 2017. The Gladiators entered a joint venture in 2018 with the Wildcats, known as the Barbarians, which only lasted one season. Following the 2018 season, the Wildcats folded. The Gladiators did not enter a team in 2019, before returning in 2020. The Tuggeranong Tornadoes did not enter a team in 2016, but came back for the 2017 season and a playoff appearance, before folding. The Central Spears did not enter a team in 2017, but returned in 2018 and made the semi-final. The Spears folded on the eve of the 2019 season. The Firebirds only fielded a Junior team in 2020 before re-branding as the University of Canberra Stars as part of a university-wide re-brand of sports teams. The club has yet to re-enter a team in ACT Gridiron competition, but fielded a Women's team in the 2022 Gridiron NSW competition.

In 2021 the league saw the introduction of the Gungahlin Wolves Gridiron Club. The club was formed by president Jason Ray and won the Junior championship in the club's inaugural season.

In 2022 the League celebrated its 30th anniversary season, with the Centurions winning a fourth consecutive title 26-22 over the Wolves. The Gladiators won the Juniors title, the first of any kind for the club since its Capital Bowl triumph in 2009.

On January 26 2024, the league announced two new league members of the Goulburn Rams and the UC Stars.

== League members ==
- Narrabundah Centurions
- Woden Valley Gladiators
- UC Stars

== Former members ==
- Gungahlin Wolves
- Central Spears
- Gungahlin Wildcats
- Tuggeranong Tornadoes
- University of Canberra Firebirds
- ACT Astros
- Canberra Tigers
- Queanbeyan Wolverines
- Erindale Titans (Juniors)
- Queanbeyan Warriors
- Kambah Kestrels (Juniors)
- Tidbinbulla Space Cadets
- Canberra Sabertooths
- Marist Razorbacks (Juniors)
- Weston Creek Buccaneers (Juniors)
- Queanbeyan Eagles/Knights (Juniors)
- Belconnen Thunderbolts

== Capital Bowl winners ==
Year	Winning team	Runners-up	Score	MVP	Winning coach
2025	Gungahlin Wolves	Centurions	23-7	Matt Phillips (Wol) - QB	Jason Ray
2024	Gungahlin Wolves	Centurions	40-23	Jake Christie (Wol) - RB	Jason Ray
2023	Gungahlin Wolves	Centurions	18-8	Jake Christie (Wol) - RB	Jason Ray
2022	Centurions	Gungahlin Wolves	26-22	Jayson Irvin (Cen) - QB	Josh Gargiulo
2021	Centurions	Gungahlin Wolves	20-14	Beau Kennett (Cen) - QB	Grant Frost
2020	Centurions	Woden Valley Gladiators	4-0**		Grant Frost
2019	Centurions	University of Canberra Firebirds	4-1*		Josh Gargiulo
2018	University of Canberra Firebirds	Centurions	29–6	Shaquille Garner (UC) - WR	Aruvin Karunakaran
2017	University of Canberra Firebirds	Tuggeranong Tornadoes	56–0	James Thornhill (UC) – RB/S	Nathan Long
2016	University of Canberra Firebirds	Central Spears	34–14		Nathan Long
2015	Central Spears	University of Canberra Firebirds	28–27	Jason Swain (CS) – WR	Tim Macarthur
2014	Central Spears	University of Canberra Firebirds	46–7	Jason Swain (CS) – WR	Tim Macarthur
2013	Central Spears	Tuggeranong Tornadoes	36–0	Joseph Taula (CS) – QB/LB	Tim Macarthur
2012	Central Spears	University of Canberra Firebirds	26–0	Joseph Taula (CS) – QB/LB	Tim Macarthur
2011	University of Canberra Firebirds	Gungahlin Wildcats	18–12	Ian Lanham (UC) – RB/FS	Shawn Willis
2010	University of Canberra Firebirds	Woden Valley Gladiators	28–11	Jeremy Milne (UC) – RB	Shawn Willis
2009	Woden Valley Gladiators	Tuggeranong Tornadoes	29–22	Tim Macarthur (WVG) – RB/FS	Andrew Old
2008	University of Canberra Firebirds	Tuggeranong Tornadoes	21–6	Luke Kominek (UC) – QB	Shawn Willis
2007	University of Canberra Firebirds	Tuggeranong Tornadoes	12–6 (2OT)	Phil Fooks (TT) – RB	Shawn Willis
2006	University of Canberra Firebirds	Tuggeranong Tornadoes	19–7	Travis Ford (UC) – RB/MLB	Shawn Willis
2005	University of Canberra Firebirds	Astros	15–14 (OT)	Travis Ford (UC) – RB/MLB	Shawn Willis
2004	Astros	University of Canberra Firebirds	20–15	Jaron Worsley (As) – RB/LB	Steve Kerr
2003	Astros	Tuggeranong Tornadoes	41–20	Steve Kerr (As) – RB	Carlos Amponin
2002	Astros	University of Canberra Firebirds	21–10	Michael Mau'u (As) – QB/ILB	Rob Bourke
2001	Astros	Queanbeyan Warriors	45–0	Steve Kerr (As) – QB	John Roe
2000	Tuggeranong Tornadoes	University of Canberra Firebirds	10–7	Cameron Dickson (TT) – DE/K	John Crispin
1999	Canberra Tigers	Tuggeranong Tornadoes	25–8	Steve Hoppitt (CT) – G/DT	Craig Simmons
1998	Tuggeranong Tornadoes	Canberra Tigers	20–12		John Crispin
1997	Tuggeranong Tornadoes	University of Canberra Firebirds	14–6		John Crispin
1996	Tuggeranong Tornadoes	Canberra Tigers	14–6		John Crispin
1995	Canberra Tigers	Queanbeyan Wolverines	14–13		Roger Vann
1994	University of Canberra Firebirds	Belconnen Thunderbolts	28–0		John Etminan
1993	Tidbinbilla Space Cadets	Belconnen Thunderbolts	12–6 (OT)	Buck Armstrong (TSC)	Michael Whitesell

(*) Championship decided over a five-game series. (**) Championship decided over a four-game series.

== Charity Bowl winners ==
Since 1994, the first game of the ACTGL Senior season has been given the title of the Charity Bowl with funds raised on the day going to local charities. Since 1998, all funds have been donated to the ACT Cancer Society in memory of Shane Gray, a founding member, former player and official of the ACT Gridiron League who died of cancer in 1996. The winning side receives the Charity Shield, a perpetual trophy donated by former ACT Chief Minister and ACT Gridiron patron Trevor Kaine.

The first Charity Bowl was played between the Tuggeranong Tornadoes and the Queanbeyan Wolverines. Since then, the game has been scheduled between the holders of the Charity Shield and the defending Capital Bowl champions. If one team holds both trophies, the opponent is the team which lost the Capital Bowl the previous year.

Year	Team
2022	Centurions
2018	University of Canberra Firebirds
2017	University of Canberra Firebirds
2016	University of Canberra Firebirds
2015	Central Spears
2014	Central Spears
2013	Central Spears
2012	University of Canberra Firebirds
2011	University of Canberra Firebirds
2010	Tuggeranong Tornadoes
2009	Tuggeranong Tornadoes
2008	University of Canberra Firebirds
2007	University of Canberra Firebirds
2006	University of Canberra Firebirds
2005	Astros
2004	Tuggeranong Tornadoes
2003	Astros
2002	Astros
2001	University of Canberra Firebirds
2000	Tuggeranong Tornadoes
1999	Tuggeranong Tornadoes
1998	Tuggeranong Tornadoes
1997	Canberra Tigers
1996	Tuggeranong Tornadoes
1995	Tuggeranong Tornadoes
1994	Tuggeranong Tornadoes

== ACTG Junior Champions ==
Year	Team	Winning coach
2025	Gungahlin Wolves	Nick George
2024	Gungahlin Wolves	Jason Ray
2023	Gungahlin Wolves	Cameron Rogerson
2022	Woden Valley Gladiators	Petar Stosic
2021	Gungahlin Wolves	Jason Ray
2020	University of Canberra Firebirds	Laurence Marin
2019	Central Spears	Tim Macarthur
2018	No competition	
2017	University of Canberra Firebirds	George Shipyan
2016	University of Canberra Firebirds	Josh Catanzariti
2015	University of Canberra Firebirds	Jason Ray
2014	University of Canberra Firebirds	Jason Ray
2013	University of Canberra Firebirds	Jason Ray
2012	Central Spears	Tim Macarthur
2011	Centurions	Alex Westcombe
2010	Centurions	Peter Lilley
2009	Centurions	Peter Lilley
2008	Tuggeranong Tornadoes	Lyle Cameron
2007	Tuggeranong Tornadoes	Lyle Cameron
2006	University of Canberra Firebirds	Shawn Willis
2005	University of Canberra Firebirds	Chris Czerny
2004	University of Canberra Firebirds	Luke Plunkett
2003	Erindale Titans	Shane Dixon
2002	No competition	
2001	Tuggeranong Tornadoes	Justin Watson
2000	University of Canberra Firebirds	Rob Bourke
1999	University of Canberra Rockets	Nathan Long
1998	No competition	
1997	University of Canberra Firebirds	Simon Clancy
1996	University of Canberra Firebirds	Simon Clancy

Year	College Division	High School Division
1995	Tuggeranong Tornadoes	Kambah Kestrels
1994	Weston Creek Buccaneers	Tuggeranong Tornadoes
1993	Queanbeyan Eagles	Weston Creek Buccaneers
1992	Tuggeranong Falcons	Queanbeyan Knights

Year	Team
1991	Marist Razorbacks
1990	Marist Razorbacks

== Statistics ==
Thirteen teams have recorded a perfect season to win a championship: the Firebirds in 1994, the Tornadoes in 1998, the Astros in 2001 and 2003, the Firebirds again in 2006, the Spears in 2013, 2014 and 2015, the Firebirds in 2016, 2017 and 2018 and the Centurions in 2020 and 2021. The 1993 Tidbinbilla Space Cadets won eight games and tied one on their way to the championship. Two teams – the Firebirds in 2000 and the Astros in 2005 – have finished the regular season undefeated but lost the Capital Bowl.

The League has seen four 4-peat championship streaks throughout its history, with the Astros (2001-04), Firebirds (2005-08), Spears (2012-15) and Centurions (2019-22) all achieving this feat. The record for the junior competition is five consecutive titles by the Firebirds, between 2013 and 2017.

The ACT Representative team is the ACT Monarchs. The Monarchs have played representative teams from NSW, Queensland, Victoria, South Australia and Western Australia since 1996. They participated in the 1996 National Championships in Canberra, the 1998 Gridiron Australia National Challenge in Sydney, the 1999 Gridiron Australia Eastern Regional Championships in Sydney as well as the 2001 and 2003 Gridiron Australia National Championships in Canberra and Adelaide, respectively. After a seven-year absence, the Monarchs returned to interstate competition at the 2010 National Championships in Melbourne. The Monarchs posted their first-ever victories at the 2001 Championships, defeating Victoria in the second round and South Australia in the third place playoff. The 2010 Monarchs defeated Queensland 12–9 in a pool game, before losing to Western Australia in the third-place playoff game. After another hiatus from state competition, the Monarchs participated in the 2014 Australian Gridiron League (AGL), suffering heavy losses to Queensland and NSW in their pool games.

The first season of Junior Gridiron in the ACT was played in 1991. At one stage there were as many as nine Junior teams playing in the local competition which was divided into two divisions – High School (ages 14–16) and College (ages 16–18). The current Junior competition is contested in one division by players 18 years old or younger.

In 1999 the junior Monarchs became the first ACT team (senior or junior) to taste victory at representative level by winning both games of a two-match series against NSW. In 2006 the Junior Monarchs finished second at the National Championships on the Gold Coast, losing only to the Queensland Sundevils, which won the tournament, in overtime. At the 2007 National Championships, the Junior Monarchs finished third overall.

In 2022 the Monarchs returned to State competition against South Australia winning 22-18 in Adelaide.

2023 saw the revival of Senior interstate competition as Wollongong played host for the ACT Monarchs in the 2023 tri state competition, where they competed against NSW and Queensland in a round robin series. 2 days later they played host to South Australia winning 21-14, only the 4th time the Monaechs have claimed victory since 2001

== See also ==
- Gridiron Australia
- UC Firebirds
- Centurions
