= List of Weber State Wildcats in the NFL draft =

This is a list of Weber State Wildcats football players in the NFL draft.

== Key ==
B	Back	K	Kicker	NT	Nose tackle
C	Center	LB	Linebacker	FB	Fullback
DB	Defensive back	P	Punter	HB	Halfback
DE	Defensive end	QB	Quarterback	WR	Wide receiver
DT	Defensive tackle	RB	Running back	G	Guard
E	End	T	Offensive tackle	TE	Tight end

== Selections ==
Year	Round	Pick	Overall	Player	Team	Position
1967	2	14	40	Ron McCall	San Diego Chargers	LB
1967	4	8	88	Lew Kamanu	Detroit Lions	DE
1967	6	8	141	Tim Jones	Detroit Lions	QB
1967	16	10	403	Bill Rogers	Chicago Bears	DB
1968	1	17	17	Lee White	New York Jets	RB
1968	6	16	154	Jim Schmedding	Chicago Bears	C
1968	8	4	196	Steve Holloway	Denver Broncos	DB
1968	9	9	228	John Knight	Pittsburgh Steelers	DE
1968	9	27	246	Steve Hanrahan	Cincinnati Bengals	DT
1968	11	17	290	Henry Owens	New York Jets	WR
1969	3	22	74	Halvor Hagen	Dallas Cowboys	DT
1969	10	24	258	Stuart Gottlieb	Dallas Cowboys	T
1969	14	13	351	Steve Smith	New York Giants	K
1970	7	11	167	Randy Montgomery	Denver Broncos	DB
1970	8	9	191	Carter Campbell	San Francisco 49ers	LB
1970	10	15	249	Russ Melby	Green Bay Packers	DT
1971	10	18	252	Henry Reed	New York Giants	LB
1971	11	2	262	Bob Pollard	New Orleans Saints	DE
1972	9	23	231	Dave Taylor	Kansas City Chiefs	DT
1972	12	6	292	Randy McDougall	Denver Broncos	DB
1972	13	17	329	Jaime Nunez	Los Angeles Rams	K
1973	5	21	125	Jon Knoble	San Diego Chargers	LB
1973	13	2	314	Richard Watkins	New Orleans Saints	DT
1973	15	11	375	Jerry Bond	Los Angeles Rams	DB
1975	14	21	359	Dave Benson	Washington Redskins	LB
1977	8	23	218	Rod Bockwoldt	Los Angeles Rams	DB
1984	7	21	189	Sam Slater	Seattle Seahawks	T
1989	4	18	102	Jeff Carlson	Los Angeles Rams	QB
1995	5	2	136	Tau Pupua	Cleveland Browns	DT
1998	7	52	241	Cam Quayle	Baltimore Ravens	TE
1999	2	28	59	Scott Shields	Pittsburgh Steelers	DB
1999	4	4	99	Anthony Parker	San Francisco 49ers	DB
2006	3	5	69	Paul McQuistan	Oakland Raiders	T
2006	7	3	211	Pat McQuistan	Dallas Cowboys	T
2008	4	35	133	David Hale	Baltimore Ravens	T
2009	7	5	214	J. D. Folsom	Miami Dolphins	LB
2010	7	48	255	Tim Toone	Detroit Lions	WR
2018	4	21	121	Taron Johnson	Buffalo Bills	DB

== Notable undrafted players ==
Note: No drafts held before 1920

Year	Player	Position	Debut Team	Notes
1968	Phil Tuckett	WR	San Diego Chargers	—
1981	Mike Humiston	LB	Buffalo Bills	—
1983	Roger Ruzek	K	Cleveland Browns	—
1986	Darryl Pollard	CB	Seattle Seahawks	—
1987	Chris Darrington	WR	Houston Oilers	—
1987	Russell Griffith	P	Seattle Seahawks	—
1992	Alfred Pupunu	TE	San Diego Chargers	—
1993	Jamie Martin	QB	Los Angeles Rams	—
2001	Ryan Prince	TE	Jacksonville Jaguars	—
2026	Gavin Ortega	OT	Denver Broncos	—

== See also ==
- List of Weber State University people
