= Alfred Terry Zirkle =

American businessman

Alfred "Fred" Zirkle is an American entrepreneur, investment banker, and industry leader.

Zirkle was an all-star football player while at Duke University and was selected by the New York Jets with the final pick of 1969 NFL Draft, making him that year's "Mr. Irrelevant". Rather than choosing football, Zirkle entered business and co-founded Key Tronic with his father. In 1991, he resigned as chairman and CEO reporting $140 million of computer hardware revenue. He then set up a merger and acquisition firm and developed BizQuest.com, the internet’s first search engine serving business owners and investors.

== Football ==
During the 1960s, Zirkle attended Duke University. He began playing football for Duke Blue Devils in 1965, as part of the defensive line. Over the next four years, Zirkle became a major part of the Blue Devil's and their success during the 1960s. Playing Defensive tackle, he became the team captain in his senior year in 1968. At the end of his senior year, he was selected to play in the Blue-Gray Classic, becoming only one of six Duke players to be selected for All-Star games in the 1960s. Zirkle was also the recipient of the Micah Harris Trinity Teammate Award, and the Blue Devil Club Award by Duke alumni to recognize Zirkle’s unique contributions.

Zirkle was selected by the New York Jets in the 17th round with the last pick (442nd overall) in the 1969 NFL Draft.

== Business career ==
After twelve years, Zirkle resigned as executive vice president of Key Tronic. He then formed a venture capital fund, Venture Sum, prior to accepting the CEO job with Alpnet, Inc. There he grew a small computer linguistic developer into a publicly held global translation network with offices in thirteen countries. In 1989, Zirkle, working from London, agreed to return to Key Tronic to help diversify into more profitable products. Keyboard prices had dropped from $115 in 1970 to $35, but Zirkle developed a laptop computer utilizing Key Tronic’s core competencies. In August 1991, The New York Times reported that Zirkle would be resigning from the corporation as company CEO and chairman citing disagreements on strategy in the board room. Following Zirkle's departure, the two major laptop customers put orders on hold. Laptop production halted and Key Tronic announced large-scale job cuts. It was thought that Zirkle strongly opposed the strategic decision, hence him leaving the business a month prior.

Zirkle then setup Zirkle & Co. a business brokerage in 1991, which later was rebranded as IndustryPro. During the 1990s, he saw real estate brokers handling small businesses and investment bankers selling corporations at $50 million or more and therefore positioned Zirkle & Co. to sell businesses at mid-range price points. The success of the business brokerage saw Zirkle expand his team to 10 within a couple of years and also launched a subsidiary which focused on business sales online. BizQuest operated as a website for merger and acquisition deals and grew throughout the 1990s. In 2010, BizQuest was acquired by LoopNet. BizQuest has since become a major broker website for selling small and online businesses. Zirkle has served as president of the three major global trade organizations: International Business Broker's Association (IBBA), M&A Source, and Association for Corporate Growth (ACG Utah). IndustryPro, with offices in Phoenix and Atlanta, employs sixty individuals worldwide providing research and merger/acquisition services for businesses from $10 to $250 million.

== Publications ==
Zirkle has authored various articles related to valuations and mergers/acquisitions. He has also published two books:

- Zirkle: Three Hundred Years from Germany to the New World and
- Life’s ROI – preparing business owners for rewarding careers and retirement.
