= Sidewinders (X-League) =

General information
- Founded: 1970
- Headquartered: Nishinomiya, Hyogo, Japan
- Colours: Red, Black and White
- Website: http://sidewinders.jp/

Personnel
- General manager: Yorimitsu Morishita
- Head coach: Hatahara

League / conference affiliations
- X-League X2 division West Division

The Sidewinders are an American football team located in the Nishinomiya, Hyogo, Japan. They are a member of the X-League X2 division.

== Team history ==
- 1970 Team founded by former Kyoto University players and staff.
- 1988 New sponsorship with the Iwatani International Corporation. Team renamed the Iwatani Sidewinders.
- 1990 Join the X-League
- 1998 Finished 4th in the West division (1 win, 4 losses)
- 2003 Finished 6th in the West division (0 wins, 5 losses). Lost X2-X1 replacement match against the Finies Football Club. Demoted to X2 for the following season.
- 2004 Finished 1st in X2 West division (5 wins, 0 losses). Won X2-X1 promotion match against the Hankyu Bruins 24-15. Promoted to X1 for the following season.
- 2006 Finished 6th in the West division (1 win, 4 losses). Lost X1-X2 replacement match against the Nagoya Cyclones) 0-7. Demoted to X2 for the following season.
- 2007 Iwatani International Corporation ends team sponsorship. Team renamed the Sidewinders.
- 2009 Finished 5th in the X2 West division (1 win, 4 losses). Lost X2-X3 against N.A.C.L. Demoted to X3 for the following season.
- 2010 Finished 1st in the X3 West division. Won X3-X2 promotion match against N.A.C.L. Promoted to X2 for the following season.
- 2015 Finished 1st in the X2 West division (5 wins, 0 losses). Won X2-X1 promotion match against the Fuji Xerox J-Stars 17-10. Promoted to X1 for the following season.

== Seasons ==
X-League champions (1987–present)	Division champions	Final Stage/Semifinals Berth	Wild Card /First Stage Berth

Season	League	Division	Regular Season				Postseason results	Awards	Head coaches
Season	League	Division	Finish	Wins	Losses	Ties	Postseason results	Awards	Head coaches
1997	X1	West	5th	1	4	0			Yorimitsu Morishita
1998	X1	West	4th	1	4	0			Yorimitsu Morishita
1999	X1	West	6th	0	5	0			Yorimitsu Morishita
2000	X1	West	6th	0	5	0			Yorimitsu Morishita
2001	X1	West	4th	2	4	0			Yorimitsu Morishita
2002	X1	West	4th	2	3	0			Yorimitsu Morishita
2003	X1	West	6th	0	6	0	Lost X1-X2 replacement match (Finies Football Club)		Yorimitsu Morishita
2004	X2	West	1st	6	0	0	Won X2-X1 promotion match (Hankyu)		Yorimitsu Morishita
2005	X1	West	5th	1	5	0			Yorimitsu Morishita
2006	X1	West	6th	1	4	0	Lost X1-X2 replacement match (Nagoya) 0-7		Yorimitsu Morishita
2007	X2	West	3rd	2	4	0			Yorimitsu Morishita
2008	X2	West	5th	1	5	0	Won X2-X3 replacement match (NACL)		Yorimitsu Morishita
2009	X2	West	5th	4	5	0	Lost X2-X3 replacement match (NACL)		Yorimitsu Morishita
2010	X3	West	1st	7	1	0	Won X3-X2 promotion match (NACL) 14-3		Yorimitsu Morishita
2011	X2	West	2nd	7	2	0			Yorimitsu Morishita
2012	X2	West	3rd	3	4	0			Yorimitsu Morishita
2013	X2	West	4th	6	2	1			Yorimitsu Morishita
2014	X2	West	2nd	6	2	0			Yorimitsu Morishita
2015	X2	West	1st	6	1	1	Won X2-X1 promotion match (Fuji Xerox) 17-10		Yorimitsu Morishita
2016	X1	West	6th	2	6	0	Lost X1-X2 replacement match (Club Hawkeye) 17-19		Yorimitsu Morishita
2017	X2	West	2nd	4	3	0	Won X2-X1 promotion match (Club Hawkeye) 17-3		Yorimitsu Morishita
2018	X1	West	6th	2	6	0	Lost X1-X2 replacement match (Opatsu Fukuoka) 7-22		Hatahara
Total				63	82	2	(1997–2018, includes only regular season)		
Total				5	5	0	(1997–2018, includes only playoffs)		
Total				68	87	2	(1997–2018, includes both regular season and playoffs)		
