= Vollert =

Vollert is a German surname. It may refer to:

- Jannes Vollert, German professional footballer
- Andrew Vollert, American football tight end
- Vollert Anlagenbau GmbH, manufacturer of VLEX, a road-rail shunting robot
