= Doug Robbins =

Doug Robbins may refer to:

- Doug Robbins, founder of Robbinex, a consultative business intermediary firm
- Doug Robbins (baseball) (born 1966), former baseball catcher
