= Mr. Irrelevant =

Final player selected in an NFL draft

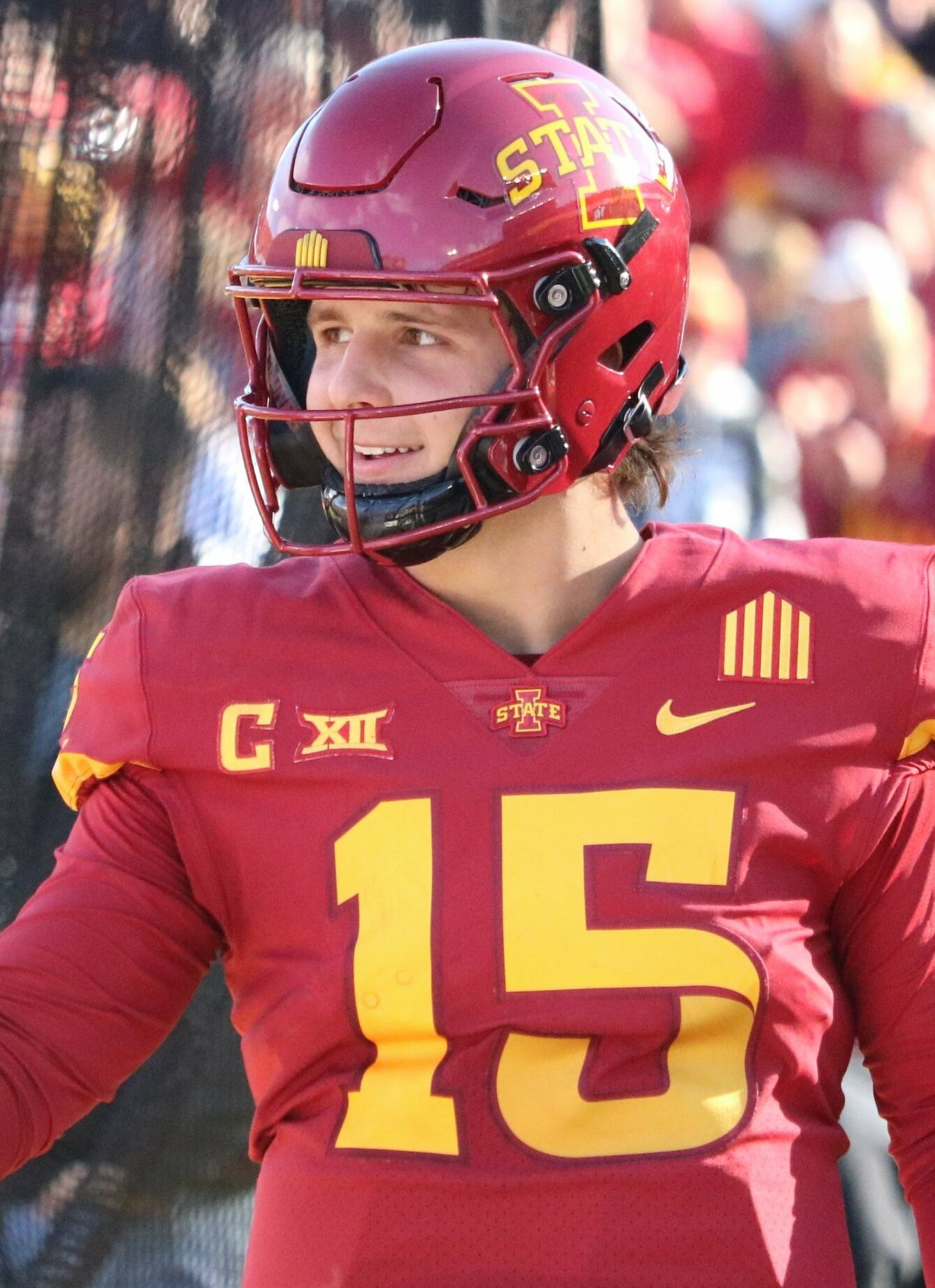
Brock Purdy was selected as Mr. Irrelevant in the 2022 NFL draft

Mr. Irrelevant is the nickname given to a player selected with the final pick in an NFL draft. Players chosen with this pick are often released from the team that drafted them before the regular season begins. Some exceptions include Jacque MacKinnon, Ryan Succop, Marty Moore, and Brock Purdy.

== History ==
"Irrelevant Week" founder Paul Salata in 1949

"Mr. Irrelevant" and "Irrelevant Week" began in 1976 when former USC and pro football receiver Paul Salata founded the event in Newport Beach, California. Salata had a short and "irrelevant" career in professional football, playing the 1949 AAFC season as a member of the San Francisco 49ers and in the 1950 NFL season for the first Baltimore Colts, and sought to bring attention to other unlauded players for whom a professional career was likely to be fleeting.

Originally organized by Salata and fellow members of the Balboa Bay Club, after each draft the new Mr. Irrelevant — last player selected in the annual NFL draft — and his family are invited to spend a week during the summer in Newport Beach. A trip to Disneyland, a golf tournament featuring a main foursome consisting of the highest-handicapped golfers from each of four neighboring courses, a No Start/No Finish regatta, a roast giving advice to the new draftee, and a ceremony awarding him the Lowsman Trophy are traditional activities associated with "Irrelevant Week". The trophy mimics the Heisman Trophy but depicts a player fumbling a football.

"Irrelevant Week" gave so much publicity to "Mr. Irrelevant" that in 1979 the Los Angeles Rams, with the penultimate pick, intentionally passed to let the Pittsburgh Steelers, with the last pick, choose before them. The Steelers also wanted the publicity and passed as well. The two teams continued to refuse to choose a player until NFL Commissioner Pete Rozelle forced the teams to pick, with the Steelers winning the pick. The incident led to the "Salata Rule", which prohibits teams from passing to get the final pick.

Prior to the establishment of Mr. Irrelevant in 1976, the first final pick to make the Pro Bowl was Bill Fischer, who was the last pick in the 1948 NFL draft. He was drafted by the Chicago Cardinals after his junior season at Notre Dame. He opted to stay in school, and won the Outland Trophy as the nation's top interior lineman in 1948. The Cardinals drafted him again in 1949, this time with their first-round pick.

The last player chosen in the 1961 NFL draft, Jacque MacKinnon, had a successful 10-season career. However, he signed with the San Diego Chargers of the rival American Football League instead of with the Philadelphia Eagles. He appeared in two AFL All-Star Games in 1966 and 1968. He is one of only three final picks to appear in a Pro Bowl or the equivalent.

Jimmy Walker was the final pick in the 1967 NFL draft, despite never having played college football. His main sport, however, was basketball, in which he was a consensus All-American and the nation's leading scorer as a senior at Providence College. Walker was the first pick in the 1967 NBA draft, and opted for a career in the NBA.

The first Mr. Irrelevant to play in the Super Bowl was Marty Moore, a special teams player drafted last in 1994, who played with the New England Patriots in Super Bowl XXXI.

Salata announced the final pick of each NFL draft until 2013; from 2014 his daughter took over in announcing the pick.

== Notable selections ==
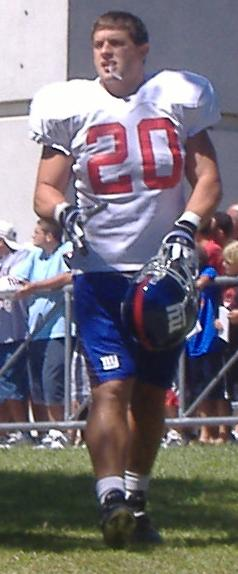
Jim Finn, Mr. Irrelevant of the 1999 NFL draft, and Super Bowl XLII champion

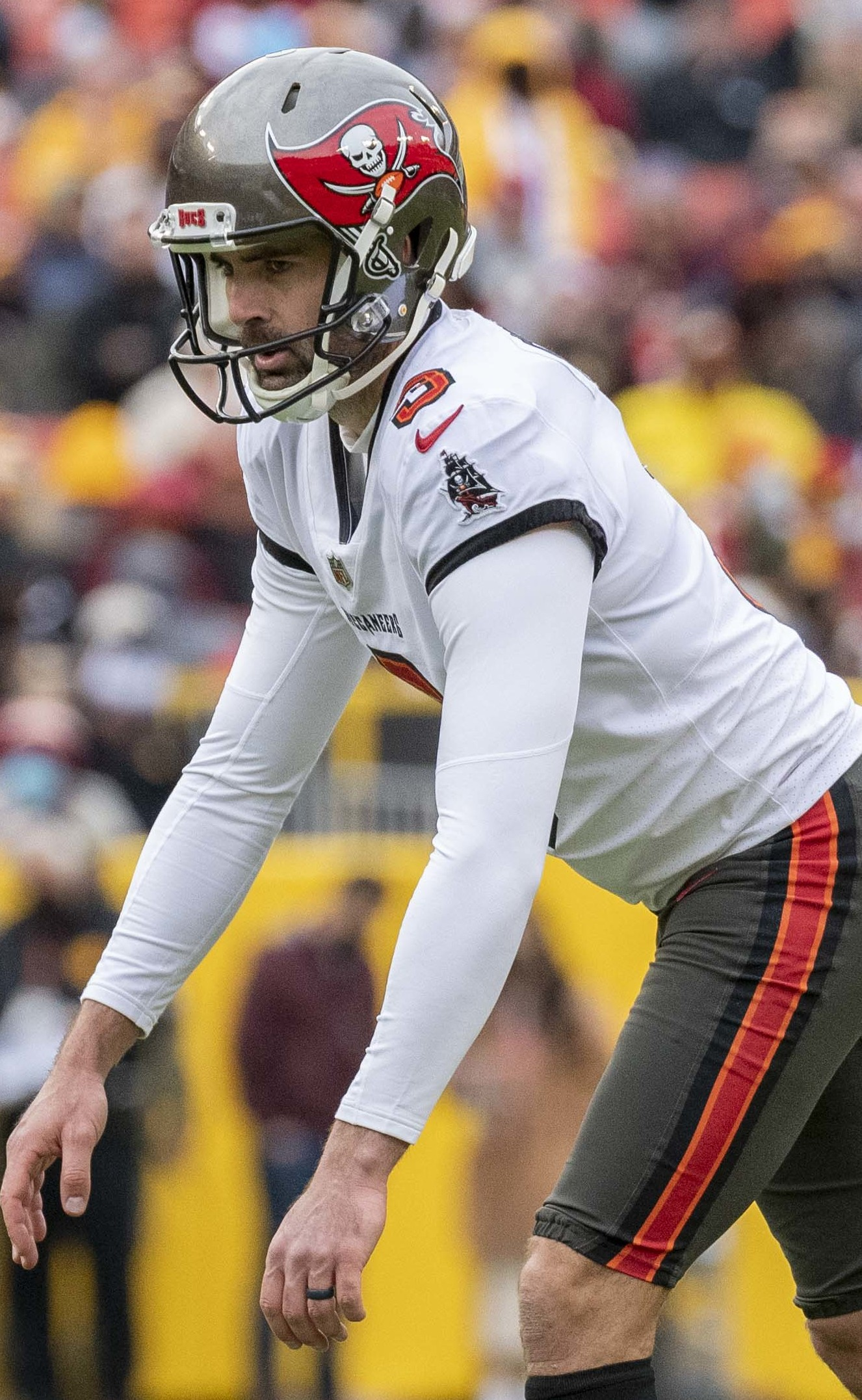
Ryan Succop, Mr. Irrelevant of the 2009 NFL draft and Super Bowl LV champion

Since the NFL draft was cut to its current seven-round format in 1994, players presented with this dubious honor have more often succeeded in making the team that drafted them, with some making significant contributions.

- Tyrone McGriff was perhaps the most successful Mr. Irrelevant from the pre-1994 era. He was drafted by the Pittsburgh Steelers with the last pick of the 12th round in 1980. He made the 1980 NFL All-Rookie Team, and played two more seasons for the Steelers. In 1983, he moved on to the Michigan Panthers of the upstart United States Football League. He won a league championship ring that year, as well as a spot on the USFL All-Star Team.
- John Tuggle started five games as a fullback his rookie year, and was named the 1983 New York Giants Special Teams Player of the Year. However, during the 1984 training camp, he was diagnosed with cancer. He never played again, and died in 1986.
- Marty Moore, a special teams player, became the first Mr. Irrelevant to play in a Super Bowl with the New England Patriots in Super Bowl XXXI and first Mr. Irrelevant to win a Super Bowl with the New England Patriots in Super Bowl XXXVI.
- Mike Green played a significant role in the Chicago Bears secondary in the 2000s, and played from 2000 to 2008.
- Jim Finn was on the roster as a fullback for the New York Giants on their victory in Super Bowl XLII. Prior to the 2007 season, Finn was placed on injured reserve and never played a game for the Giants on their road to the Super Bowl that year, having been replaced by Madison Hedgecock. He had been the Giants fullback for four seasons.
- Ryan Succop, the 2009 designee, became the starting kicker for the Kansas City Chiefs. He went on to tie the NFL record for highest field goal percentage by a rookie in a season with 86.2 percent, and also passed NFL Hall of Famer Jan Stenerud for most field goals made by a rookie in Chiefs history. Succop was awarded the Mack Lee Hill Award that year. He has been a starting kicker since his rookie season. Succop moved on to the Tennessee Titans for the 2014 season and was signed to a contract extension in early 2018 before being released in March 2020 and signing with the Tampa Bay Buccaneers in early September. He proceeded to win Super Bowl LV with the team, becoming the second Mr. Irrelevant to win an NFL championship, and first to play and win a Super Bowl as a starter and as an active player.
- Chad Kelly, the 2017 designee and former Ole Miss quarterback, is the nephew of former Buffalo Bills quarterback and Hall of Famer Jim Kelly. Drafted last largely because injury and discipline questions had lowered his previously high draft stock, Kelly progressed to become the Denver Broncos' second-string quarterback by the 2018 preseason before being released on October 24, 2018. He later signed with the Indianapolis Colts. After moving to the Canadian Football League, Kelly won the 109th Grey Cup in relief of Toronto Argonauts starting quarterback McLeod Bethel-Thompson. The following season Kelly led the team to a 16–2 record before they lost in the playoffs to the eventual champions in Montreal. He was later awarded the CFL most outstanding player for that season.
- Brock Purdy, the 2022 designee, became the starting quarterback for the San Francisco 49ers in his rookie season and is the only rookie quarterback to beat Tom Brady in a starting debut, as well as the first Mr. Irrelevant to score a passing and rushing touchdown in the regular season, and the first to start and win a playoff game. In his sophomore season, Purdy led the 49ers to an appearance in Super Bowl LVIII and became the first 49ers quarterback in two decades to be named to the Pro Bowl. He is the NFL's all-time leader in passer rating and holds San Francisco's franchise record for single-season passing yards. He was a third-place finalist for Offensive Rookie of the Year in 2023 and finished fourth in MVP voting in 2024. Purdy was nicknamed "Mr. Relevant" for his immediate impact and rise to prominence, and is considered to be the greatest "Mr. Irrevelant" of all time.

== Mr. Irrelevant selections ==
= Selected to Pro Bowl
= Won the Super Bowl

List of final picks in NFL drafts
Year	Round	Pick	Overall	Name	Team	Position	College	Games
1936	9	9	81	Phil Flanagan	Giants	G	Holy Cross	2
1937	10	10	100	Solon Holt	Rams	G	TCU	0
1938	12	10	110	Ferd Dreher	Bears	E	Denver	3
1939	22	5	200	Jack Rhodes	Giants	G	Texas	0
1940	22	5	200	Myron Claxton	Giants	T	Whittier	0
1941	22	2	204	Mort Landsberg	Steelers	B	Cornell	17
1942	22	5	200	Stu Clarkson	Bears	C	Texas A&I	75
1943	32	5	300	Bo Bogovich	Redskins	G	Delaware	0
1944	32	6	330	Walton Roberts	Yanks	B	Texas	0
1945	32	6	330	Billy Joe Aldridge	Packers	B	Oklahoma A&M	0
1946	32	5	300	John West	Rams	B	Oklahoma	0
1947	32	7	300	Don Clayton	Giants	B	North Carolina	0
1948 (Note: Fischer was originally drafted last in the 1948 Draft by the Chicago Cardinals, although he elected to remain at college. He was then drafted by the same team in the first round of the 1949 Draft.)	32	7	300	Bill Fischer	Cardinals	G	Notre Dame	49
1949	25	10	251	John Schweder	Eagles	G	Penn	71
1950	30	13	391	Dud Parker	Eagles	B	Baylor	0
1951	30	11	362	Sisto Averno	Browns	G	Muhlenberg	51
1952	30	11	360	John Saban	Browns	B	Xavier	0
1953	30	11	360	Hal Maus	Lions	E	Montana	0
1954	30	11	360	Ellis Horton	Lions	B	Eureka (IL)	0
1955	30	11	360	Lamar Leachman	Browns	C	Tennessee	0
1956	30	11	360	Bob Bartholomew	Browns	T	Wake Forest	0
1957	30	11	360	Don Gest	Giants	E	Washington State	0
1958	30	11	360	Tommy Bronson	Lions	B	Tennessee	0
1959	30	12	360	Blair Weese	Colts	B	West Virginia Tech	0
1960	20	12	240	Bill Gorman	Giants	T	McMurry	0
1961	20	14	280	Jacque MacKinnon	Eagles	B	Colgate	118
1962	20	14	280	Mike Snodgrass	Packers	C	Western Michigan	0
1963	20	14	280	Bobby Brezina	Packers	B	Houston	1
1964	20	14	280	Dick Niglio	Bears	RB	Yale	0
1965	20	14	280	George Haffner	Colts	QB	McNeese State	0
1966	20	15	305	Tom Carr	Colts	T	Morgan State	4
1967	17	26	445	Jimmy Walker	Saints	WR	Providence	0
1968	17	27	462	Jimmy Smith	Bengals	TE	Jackson State	0
1969	17	26	442	Fred Zirkle	Jets	DT	Duke	0
1970	17	26	442	Rayford Jenkins	Chiefs	DB	Alcorn A&M	0
1971 (Note: Although some contemporary sources list Don Nottingham, who had a seven-year career in the NFL, as the last pick of this draft, the Oakland Raiders passed when their time came to pick in the last round and wound up choosing last.)	17	26	442	Charles Hill	Raiders	WR	Sam Houston State	0
1972	17	26	442	Alphonso Cain	Cowboys	DT	Bethune–Cookman	0
1973	17	26	442	Charlie Wade	Dolphins	WR	Tennessee State	21
1974	17	26	442	Ken Dickerson	Dolphins	DB	Tuskegee	0
1975	17	26	442	Stan Hegener	Steelers	G	Nebraska	0
1976	17	28	487	Kelvin Kirk	Steelers	WR	Dayton	0
1977	12	27	335	Jim Kelleher	Vikings	RB	Colorado	0
1978	12	28	334	Lee Washburn	Cowboys	G	Montana State	0
1979	12	27	330	Mike Almond	Steelers	WR	Northwestern State	0
1980	12	28	333	Tyrone McGriff	Steelers	G	Florida A&M	36
1981	12	28	332	Phil Nelson	Raiders	TE	Delaware	0
1982	12	28	334	Tim Washington	49ers	DB	Fresno State	2
1983	12	28	335	John Tuggle	Giants (Note: Pick traded from the Washington Redskins to the New York Giants prior to selection.)	RB	California	16
1984	12	28	336	Randy Essington	Raiders	QB	Colorado	0
1985	12	28	336	Donald Chumley	49ers	DT	Georgia	0
1986	12	28	333	Mike Travis	Chargers	DB	Georgia Tech	0
1987	12	28	335	Norman Jefferson	Packers (Note: Pick traded from the New York Giants to the Green Bay Packers prior to selection.)	DB	LSU	14
1988	12	28	333	Jeff Beathard	Rams (Note: Pick traded from the Washington Redskins to the Los Angeles Rams prior to selection.)	WR	Southern Oregon	0
1989	12	28	335	Everett Ross	Vikings (Note: Pick traded from the San Francisco 49ers through the Los Angeles Raiders to the Minnesota Vikings prior to selection.)	WR	Ohio State	0
1990	12	27	331	Demetrius Davis	Raiders (Note: Pick traded from the San Francisco 49ers to the Los Angeles Raiders prior to selection.)	TE	Nevada	0
1991	12	28	334	Larry Wanke	Giants	QB	John Carroll	0
1992	12	28	336	Matt Elliott	Redskins	C	Michigan	63
1993	8	28	224	Daron Alcorn	Buccaneers (Note: Pick traded from the Dallas Cowboys to the Tampa Bay Buccaneers prior to selection.)	K	Akron	0
1994	7	28	222	Marty Moore	Patriots (Note: Pick traded from the Dallas Cowboys to the New England Patriots prior to selection.)	LB	Kentucky	112
1995	7	41	249	Michael Reed	Panthers	DB	Boston College	3
1996	7	45	254	Sam Manuel	49ers	LB	New Mexico State	0
1997	7	39	240	Ronnie McAda	Packers	QB	Army	0
1998	7	52	241	Cam Quayle	Ravens	TE	Weber State	0
1999	7	47	253	Jim Finn	Bears (Note: Supplemental pick awarded to the reactivated Cleveland Browns, traded from the Browns to the Chicago Bears prior to selection.)	RB	Pennsylvania	106
2000	7	48	254	Michael Green	Bears (Note: Supplemental pick awarded to the reactivated Cleveland Browns, traded from the Browns to the Chicago Bears prior to selection.)	DB	Northwestern State	104
2001	7	46	246	Tevita Ofahengaue	Cardinals	TE	BYU	0
2002	7	50	261	Ahmad Miller	Texans	DT	UNLV	0
2003	7	48	262	Ryan Hoag	Raiders (Note: Supplemental pick awarded to the expansion Houston Texans, traded from the Texans to the Oakland Raiders prior to selection.)	WR	Gustavus Adolphus	0
2004	7	54	255	Andre Sommersell	Raiders	LB	Colorado State	0
2005	7	41	255	Andy Stokes	Patriots	TE	William Penn	0
2006	7	47	255	Kevin McMahan	Raiders	WR	Maine	0
2007	7	45	255	Ramzee Robinson	Lions	CB	Alabama	26
2008	7	45	252	David Vobora	Rams	OLB	Idaho	40
2009	7	47	256	Ryan Succop	Chiefs	K	South Carolina	216
2010	7	48	255	Tim Toone	Lions	WR	Weber State	0
2011	7	53	254	Cheta Ozougwu	Texans	DE	Rice	9
2012	7	46	253	Chandler Harnish	Colts	QB	Northern Illinois	0
2013	7	48	254	Justice Cunningham	Colts	TE	South Carolina	4
2014	7	41	256	Lonnie Ballentine	Texans	S	Memphis	4
2015	7	39	256	Gerald Christian	Cardinals	TE	Louisville	3
2016	7	32	253	Kalan Reed	Titans (Note: Pick traded from the Denver Broncos to the Tennessee Titans prior to selection. This was a non-compensatory pick.)	CB	Southern Miss	7
2017	7	35	253	Chad Kelly	Broncos	QB	Ole Miss	1
2018	7	38	256	Trey Quinn	Redskins (Note: Compensatory pick traded from the Atlanta Falcons to the Washington Redskins prior to selection; from 2017 onwards, compensatory picks may be traded.)	WR	SMU	16
2019	7	40	254	Caleb Wilson	Cardinals	TE	UCLA	5
2020	7	41	255	Tae Crowder	Giants	LB	Georgia	43
2021	7	31	259	Grant Stuard	Buccaneers	LB	Houston	66
2022	7	41	262	Brock Purdy	49ers	QB	Iowa State	58
2023	7	42	259	Desjuan Johnson	Rams (Note: Supplemental compensatory pick traded from the Houston Texans to the Los Angeles Rams prior to selection.)	DE	Toledo	32
2024	7	37	257	Jaylen Key	Jets	S	Alabama	0
2025	7	41	257	Kobee Minor	Patriots (Note: Compensatory pick traded from the Kansas City Chiefs to the New England Patriots prior to selection; from 2017 onwards, compensatory picks may be traded.)	CB	Memphis	5
2026	7	41	257	Red Murdock	Broncos	LB	Buffalo	0

== Mr. Irrelevant picks by NFL team ==
The New York Giants have held the Mr. Irrelevant pick a total of nine times, the most of any NFL team. The Boston Yanks are the only defunct franchise to have held a Mr. Irrelevant pick. The Atlanta Falcons, Buffalo Bills, Jacksonville Jaguars, and Seattle Seahawks are the only teams that have never had a Mr. Irrelevant pick.

Team	Picks	Year(s)	Notes
New York Giants	9	1936, 1939, 1940, 1947, 1957, 1960, 1983, 1991, 2020	
Las Vegas Raiders	7	1971, 1981, 1984, 1990, 2003, 2004, 2006	5 as the Oakland Raiders; 2 as the Los Angeles Raiders
Chicago Bears	5	1938, 1942, 1964, 1999, 2000	
Detroit Lions	5	1953, 1954, 1958, 2007, 2010	
Green Bay Packers	5	1945, 1962, 1963, 1987, 1997	
Indianapolis Colts	5	1959, 1965, 1966, 2012, 2013	3 as the Baltimore Colts; 2 as the Indianapolis Colts
Los Angeles Rams	5	1937, 1946, 1988, 2008, 2023	1 as the Cleveland Rams; 1 as the St. Louis Rams; 3 as the Los Angeles Rams
Pittsburgh Steelers	5	1941, 1975, 1976, 1979, 1980	
Arizona Cardinals	4	1949, 2001, 2015, 2019	1 as the Chicago Cardinals; 3 as the Arizona Cardinals
Cleveland Browns	4	1951, 1952, 1955, 1956	
San Francisco 49ers	4	1982, 1985, 1996, 2022	
Houston Texans	3	2002, 2011, 2014	
New England Patriots	3	1994, 2005, 2025	
Philadelphia Eagles	3	1949, 1950, 1961	
Washington Commanders	3	1943, 1992, 2018	3 as the Washington Redskins
Dallas Cowboys	2	1972, 1978	
Denver Broncos	2	2017, 2026	
Kansas City Chiefs	2	1970, 2009	
Miami Dolphins	2	1973, 1974	
Minnesota Vikings	2	1977, 1989	
New York Jets	2	1969, 2024	
Tampa Bay Buccaneers	2	1993, 2021	
Baltimore Ravens	1	1998	
Boston Yanks	1	1944	
Carolina Panthers	1	1995	
Cincinnati Bengals	1	1968	
Los Angeles Chargers	1	1986	1 as the San Diego Chargers
New Orleans Saints	1	1967	
Tennessee Titans	1	2016	

== Mr. Irrelevant picks by school ==
Alabama, Colorado, Delaware, Georgia, Houston, Memphis, Northwestern State, Penn, South Carolina, Tennessee, Texas, and Weber State have each had the most Mr. Irrelevant picks with 2. No schools have ever had a Mr. Irrelevant pick in consecutive years.

School	Total	Year(s)
Alabama	2	2007, 2024
Colorado	2	1977, 1984
Delaware	2	1943, 1981
Georgia	2	1985, 2020
Houston	2	1963, 2021
Memphis	2	2014, 2025
Northwestern State	2	1979, 2000
Penn	2	1949, 1999
South Carolina	2	2009, 2013
Tennessee	2	1955, 1958
Texas	2	1939, 1944
Weber State	2	1998, 2010
Akron	1	1993
Alcorn A&M	1	1970
Army	1	1997
Baylor	1	1950
Bethune–Cookman	1	1972
Boston College	1	1995
Buffalo	1	2026
BYU	1	2001
California	1	1983
Colgate	1	1961
Colorado State	1	2004
Cornell	1	1941
Dayton	1	1976
Denver	1	1938
Duke	1	1969
Eureka (IL)	1	1954
Florida A&M	1	1980
Fresno State	1	1982
Georgia Tech	1	1986
Gustavus Adolphus	1	2003
Holy Cross	1	1936
Idaho	1	2008
Iowa State	1	2022
Jackson State	1	1968
John Carroll	1	1991
Kentucky	1	1994
Louisville	1	2015
LSU	1	1987
Maine	1	2006
McMurry	1	1960
McNeese State	1	1965
Michigan	1	1992
Montana	1	1953
Montana State	1	1978
Morgan State	1	1966
Muhlenberg	1	1951
Nebraska	1	1975
Nevada	1	1990
New Mexico State	1	1996
North Carolina	1	1947
Northern Illinois	1	2012
Notre Dame	1	1948 (Note: Fischer was originally drafted last in the 1948 Draft by the Chicago Cardinals, although he elected to remain at college. He was then drafted by the same team in the first round of the 1949 Draft.)
Ohio State	1	1989
Oklahoma	1	1946
Oklahoma A&M	1	1945
Ole Miss	1	2017
Providence	1	1967
Rice	1	2011
Sam Houston State	1	1971
SMU	1	2018
Southern Miss	1	2016
Southern Oregon	1	1988
TCU	1	1937
Tennessee State	1	1973
Texas A&I	1	1942
Toledo	1	2023
Tuskegee	1	1974
UCLA	1	2019
UNLV	1	2002
Wake Forest	1	1956
Washington State	1	1957
West Virginia Tech	1	1959
Western Michigan	1	1962
Whittier	1	1940
William Penn	1	2005
Xavier	1	1952
Yale	1	1964

== Mr. Irrelevant picks by position ==
First overall selections by position played
Position	Number of selections	Last year selected
Offensive linemen	18	1992
Defensive backs	15	2025
Backs	12	1963
Wide receivers	11	2018
Tight ends	9	2019
Quarterbacks	7	2022
Linebackers	7	2026
Defensive linemen	4	2002
Running backs	4	1999
Ends	3	1957
Kickers	2	2009

== Feature film ==
The upcoming film Mr. Irrelevant, directed by Jonathan Levine, stars David Corenswet as 1983 designee John Tuggle, alongside Isabel May, Michael Shannon, and David Krumholtz. It is scheduled to be released in theaters on December 25, 2026.

== Marketing ==
Mr. Irrelevant Enterprises, LLC produces promotional marketing under the "Mr. Irrelevant" trademark, including a best-selling book titled 50 Irrelevants Who Rocked the World, highlighting the stories of 50 well-known personalities who were once doubted or overlooked but went on to achieve extraordinary success.

Premium apparel brand Values Driven also collaborates with each year's Mr. Irrelevant to launch a limited-edition apparel line that "embodies resilience and the spirit of overcoming doubt". The company, in partnership with regional sandwich chain Ike's Love & Sandwiches, offered a "Mr. Irrelevant" sandwich designed by celebrity chef Cat Cora.

== See also ==
- List of first overall NFL draft picks
