= Ibba =

Ibba may refer to:

== People ==
- Ibba Laajab (born 1985), Norwegian professional footballer
- Angie (Angelica Paola Ibba, born 2001), Italian singer-songwriter

== Other uses ==
- International Business Broker's Association, a professional association in the fields of business brokerage and mergers and acquisitions in the US and Canada
- Ibbas or Ibba, 6th-century Ostrogothic military officer
- Ibba County, administrative area in Western Equatoria State, South Sudan
