= As One Black Eagles =

American football team in Osaka, Japan

AS ONE Black Eagles

General information
- Founded: 1970
- Headquartered: Osaka, Osaka, Japan
- Colors: Black, White and Red
- Website: http://www.blackeagles1970.net/

Personnel
- General manager: Yoshimasa Takao
- Head coach: Yoshimasa Takao

League / conference affiliations
- X-League; West Division

The AS ONE Black Eagles are an American football team located in Osaka, Osaka, Japan. They are a member of the X-League.

== Team history ==
- 1970 Team Founded.
- 1971 Team named the Black Eagles
- 1989 New sponsorship agreement signed with Java apparel group. Team renamed the Java Black Eagles.
- 1993 Lost to Sanwa Bank in the Green Bowl Final 12-21. At the end of the Fall season, Java ends sponsorship with the team.
- 1994 Team name changed to the Osaka Black Eagles.
- 1997 New sponsorship agreement signed with (Ltd.) Iuchi
- 2001 Iuchi Ltd. changes company name to As One Co., Ltd. Team name changed to As One Black Eagles.

== Seasons ==
X-League champions (1987–present)	Division champions	Final Stage/Semifinals Berth	Wild Card /2nd Stage Berth

Season	Division	Regular Season				Postseason results	Awards	Head coaches
Season	Division	Finish	Wins	Losses	Ties	Postseason results	Awards	Head coaches
2003	West	3rd	3	3	0			
2004	West	3rd	3	2	0			
2005	West	4th	2	3	0			
2006	West	5th	1	5	0			
2007	West	4th	2	5	0			
2008	West	6th	1	5	0			
2009	West	6th	0	7	0	Won 2nd stage relegation match (Elecom Kobe) 22-17; Won 2nd stage relegation match (Asahi Pretec) 37-15		
2010	West	5th	2	5	0	Won 2nd stage relegation match (Nagoya) 30-6; Lost 2nd stage relegation match (Elecom Kobe 21-26		
2011	West	3rd	3	4	0	Lost 2nd stage match (Kashima) 7-55; Lost 2nd stage match (Nojima Sagamihara) 7-35		
2012	West	3rd	5	2	0	Lost 2nd stage match (Kashima) 6-40; Lost 2nd stage match (Fujitsu) 9-27		
2013	West	3rd	3	4	0	Lost 2nd stage match (Fujitsu) 0-55; Lost 2nd stage match (Nojima Sagamihara) 7-42		
2014	West	4th	3	4	0	Won 2nd stage relegation match (Nishinomiya) 37-14; Won 2nd stage relegation match (Nagoya) 36-12; Lost Battle9 Final (All Mitsubishi) 10-35		Motoyasu Yoshii
2015	West	4th	2	5	0	Won 2nd stage relegation match (Fuji Xerox) 73-0; Won 2nd stage relegation match (Nagoya) 44-0; Lost Battle9 Final (at All Mitsubishi) 21-24		Motoyasu Yoshii
2016	West	4th	4	4	0	Lost Wildcard match (at Elecom Kobe) 7-34; Lost Battle9/Super9 classification match (at Asahi Soft Drinks) 7-39		Motoyasu Yoshii
2017	West	4th	3	5	0	Lost Wildcard match (at Elecom Kobe) 17-47; Lost Battle9/Super9 classification match (at Asahi Soft Drinks) 7-27		Motoyasu Yoshii
2018	West	4th	3	5	0			Motoyasu Yoshii
2019	X1 Area West	4th	0	8	0			Motoyasu Yoshii
2020	X1 Area West	3rd	1	2	0			Motoyasu Yoshii
2021	X1 Area West	3rd	3	3	0			Takeshi Kasamatsu
2022	X1 Area	5th	3	6	0			Yusuke Kano
2023	X1 Area	5th	5	5	0			Yusuke Kano
2024	X1 Area West	1st	3	2	0	Lost X1-Area/X1 Super Promotion/Relegation match (at Pleiades Fukuoka) 20-34		Yusuke Kano
2025	X1 Area West	3rd	3	4	1			Yoshimasa Takao
Total						(2003–2025, includes only regular season)		
Total						(2003–2025, includes only playoffs)		
Total						(2003–2025, includes both regular season and playoffs)		
