= Robbinex =

Robbinex Inc.
- Company type: Private
- Industry: Mergers and Acquisitions
- Founded: 1974; 52 years ago
- Headquarters: Grimsby, Ontario, Canada
- Number of locations: 7
- Area served: Canada, United States
- Key people: Doug Robbins; President and Founder
- Services: Consultative Business Intermediary
- Website: Official website

Robbinex Inc. is a consultative business intermediary firm specializing in the sale of mid-sized privately held companies. Robbinex was founded in 1974 by Doug Robbins in Hamilton, Ontario but since then has expanded to include offices throughout Canada and the United States. Robbinex focuses on midsize businesses with sales between 2.5 and 20 million dollars but has sold companies with over 50 million in sales in the past. Plan for Business Succession

In recent years the company has begun to focus on the education aspects of M&A; a previously avoided subject in the industry. Due to the lack of information on the subject, the company felt that a shift in focus towards education could open up new horizons and as such, they have created a number of workshops, seminars, "webinars" and other training programs to help educate their employees, clients, other professionals and business intermediaries.

Robbinex is responsible for a fair deal of academic literature on the subject of business intermediation which have been published in several newspapers and magazines, including the Hamilton Spectator, M&A Today and the Financial Post (a division of the National Post) to name a few.

== Industry firsts ==
- Robbinex created the Three Phase Process of Selling Businesses Three Phase Process. Each of the three phases has a specific function. Phase 1 determines the company’s worth, Phase 2 prepares the documentation to represent the business, and Phase 3 negotiates to achieve the best possible value for the business owner. The Three Phase Process is recognized by business brokers as one of the most important works of recent times on the subject and is the only business mediation process that is ISO9001 registered.
- Robbinex was a founding member of the Swiss-based organization, the International Corporate Finance Group (ICFG). It was the first North American company to join the ICFG. Robbinex was also a founding member of the US based organization, the M&A Source. Doug Robbins was one of the organization's founding directors.
- Robbinex introduced industrial psychology to the field of business intermediation. Specifically administration of the TAIS (The Attentional and Interpersonal Style Inventory) for prospective clients, buyers and employees.
- Robbinex runs "webinars", or internet seminars, on business intermediation in order to educate clients and partners on the intermediation process.
