= Honor Jackson =

American football player (born 1948)

No. 29, 20, 22
- Position: Safety

Personal information
- Born: November 21, 1948 (age 77); New Orleans, Louisiana, U.S.
- Listed height: 6 ft 1 in (1.85 m)
- Listed weight: 195 lb (88 kg)

Career information
- High school: Tamalpais (Mill Valley, California)
- College: Pacific
- NFL draft: 1971: 9th round, 233rd overall pick

Career history
- Dallas Cowboys (1971)*; New England Patriots (1972–1973); New York Giants (1973–1974)
- * Offseason or practice squad member only

Awards and highlights
- All-PCAA (1970)

Career NFL statistics
- Games played: 34
- Stats at Pro Football Reference

Honor W. Jackson (born November 21, 1948) is an American former professional football player who was a defensive back in the National Football League (NFL) for the New England Patriots and New York Giants. He was selected by the Dallas Cowboys in the ninth round of the 1971 NFL draft. He played college football for the Pacific Tigers.

== Early life ==
Jackson attended Tamalpais High School where he played defensive end. Although he received interest from division I schools, because of grades, he opted to go to College of Marin where he was converted to wide receiver.

In 1969, he transferred to the University of the Pacific, lettering in football and track. As a senior, he registered 55 receptions for 931 yards, 5 touchdowns, ranked 12th in the nation in receiving average (16.9 yards) and earned All-PCAA honors. He finished his college career with 74 receptions for 1,236 yards and 8 touchdowns.

In 2005, he was inducted into the Pacific Athletics Hall of Fame.

== Professional career ==
=== Dallas Cowboys ===
Jackson was selected by the Dallas Cowboys in the ninth round (233rd overall) of the 1971 NFL draft, who had a strong team that was coming off a Super Bowl V appearance and would eventually win Super Bowl VI. It was decided to switch Jackson to defensive back, in order for him to have a better chance to make the roster, even though he had never played the position before.

During the 1971 offseason, because Duane Thomas was going through a contract dispute (he requested that his 3-year contract be rewritten) and refused to report to training camp, the Cowboys decided to trade him to the New England Patriots. Although Jackson was waived on July 26, he was included as part of the transaction alongside Halvor Hagen, in exchange for Carl Garrett and the Patriots number one draft choice in the 1972 NFL draft.

Within a week, because of problems with the Patriots organization and head coach John Mazur, in an unprecedented move, the NFL commissioner voided part of the trade, sending Thomas and Garrett back to their original teams. The Patriots kept Hagen and Jackson, in exchange for a second and third round draft choices in the 1972 NFL draft, which the Cowboys eventually used to select Robert Newhouse and Mike Keller.

=== New England Patriots ===
Jackson was tried first at wide receiver, before being moved to safety after the Patriots claimed Randy Vataha off waivers, who was a college teammate of starting quarterback Jim Plunkett.

He ended up starting at strong safety in 1972, leading the team in pass interceptions with four. His best performance came against the Miami Dolphins on December 3, when he registered two interceptions and knocked Mercury Morris out of game during the Dolphins' perfect season. The next year, he played in nine games mostly as a reserve, before being cut on November 10.

=== New York Giants ===
Jackson signed as a free agent with the New York Giants in 1973. He was released on September 12, 1974, before being brought back to the team. That same year he was placed on the injured reserve list with a nerve injury in his right leg. He could never recover physically and decided to retire from professional football at the age of 27.

== Personal life ==
He worked as a manager for Longs Drugs and also became president of the Northern California chapter of the NFL Alumni Association.
