= Sealver Siliga =

American football player (born 1990)

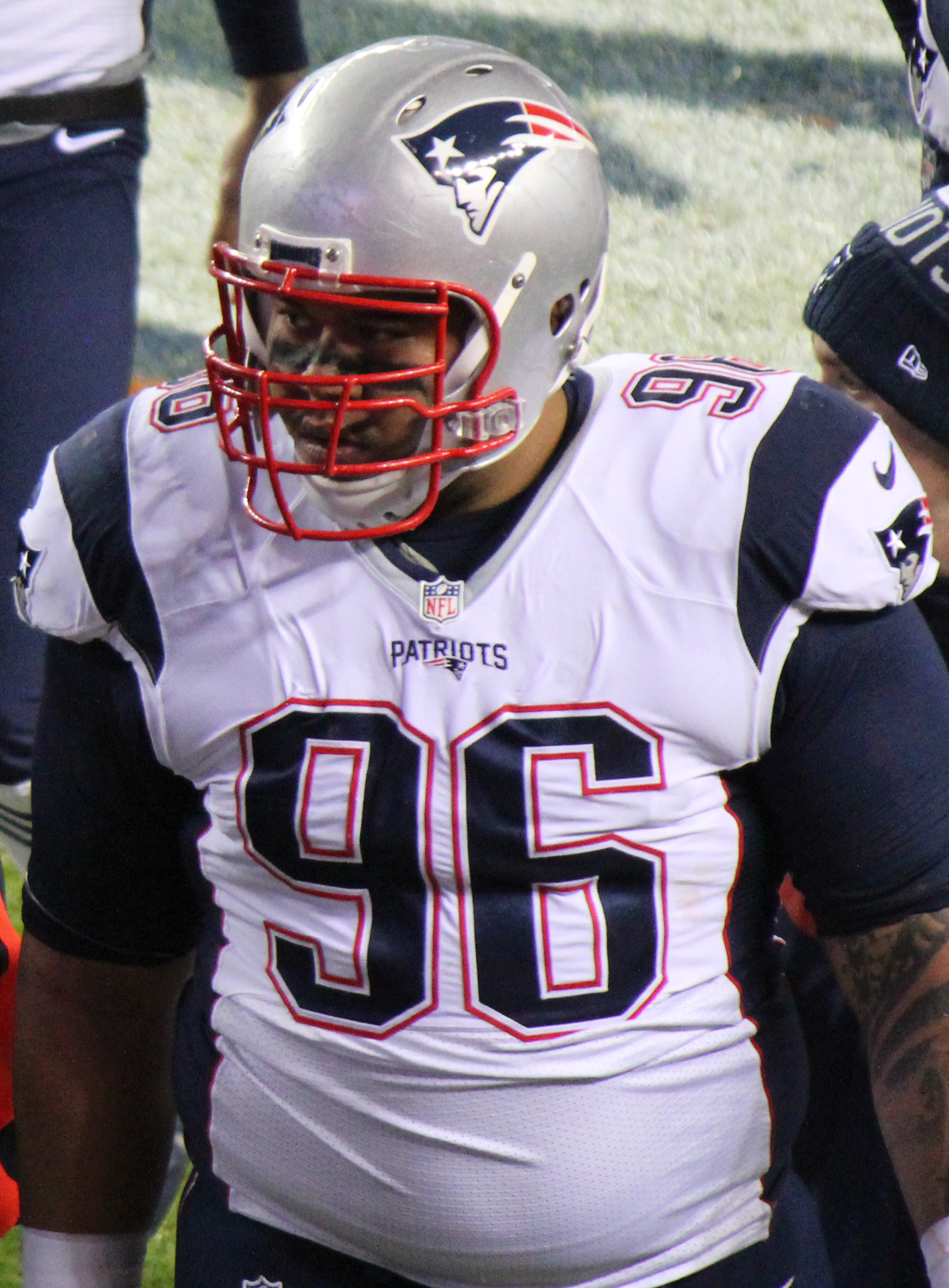
- Siliga with the New England Patriots in 2015

No. 70, 71, 92, 96, 98
- Position: Defensive tackle

Personal information
- Born: April 26, 1990 (age 36); West Jordan, Utah, U.S.
- Listed height: 6 ft 2 in (1.88 m)
- Listed weight: 345 lb (156 kg)

Career information
- High school: Copper Hills (West Jordan)
- College: Utah
- NFL draft: 2011: undrafted

Career history
- San Francisco 49ers (2011)*; Denver Broncos (2011−2012); Seattle Seahawks (2013)*; New England Patriots (2013−2015); Seattle Seahawks (2016); Tampa Bay Buccaneers (2016–2017); Jacksonville Jaguars (2018)*; Salt Lake Stallions (2019)
- * Offseason or practice squad member only

Awards and highlights
- Super Bowl champion (XLIX)

Career NFL statistics
- Total tackles: 102
- Sacks: 6.5
- Forced fumbles: 1
- Stats at Pro Football Reference

Tupaimoefitpo "Sealver" Siliga (born April 26, 1990) is an American former professional football player who was a defensive tackle in the National Football League (NFL). He played college football for the Utah Utes.

== College career ==
Siliga grew up in a Samoan American family of 13 in West Jordan, Utah and graduated from Copper Hills High School. At the University of Utah, Siliga appeared in 37 games in his three-year career for the Utes and finished with 97 tackles. After his sophomore and junior years, he was awarded honorable mention All-Mountain West.

== NFL career ==
=== San Francisco 49ers ===
After going undrafted, Siliga was signed by the 49ers as an undrafted free agent on July 28, 2011. He was released by the 49ers on September 3, 2011.

=== Denver Broncos ===
Siliga was signed to the Denver Broncos' practice squad on October 18, 2011. Prior to the 2012 opening game, Siliga was added to the active roster.

=== Seattle Seahawks (first stint) ===
On August 20, 2013, Siliga was traded to the Seattle Seahawks in exchange for guard John Moffitt. He was released on September 17, 2013, but re-signed to their practice squad on September 24, 2013.

=== New England Patriots ===
Siliga was signed to the New England Patriots practice squad on October 23, 2013. He was later activated to the 53-man roster and played five regular season games.

After an injury early in the 2014 season, Siliga was placed on injured reserve with the designation to return. On November 27, 2014, Siliga practiced for the first time, starting the 21-day period in which he could be activated. Siliga was added to the active roster on December 6. He started Super Bowl XLIX on February 1, 2015.

=== Seattle Seahawks (second stint) ===
On March 14, 2016 Siliga signed a one-year deal with the Seattle Seahawks worth $1.4M with $250,000 guaranteed. Siliga was placed on injured reserve. On September 3, 2016, he was released from the Seahawks' injured reserve. He was re-signed on October 18, 2016, then waived again on November 15, 2016.

=== Tampa Bay Buccaneers ===
Siliga was claimed off waivers by the Buccaneers on November 16, 2016.

On March 11, 2017, Siliga re-signed with the Buccaneers.

=== Jacksonville Jaguars ===
Siliga was signed by the Jacksonville Jaguars on August 3, 2018. He was released by the Jaguars on September 1, 2018.

=== Alternative Leagues ===
On December 22, 2018, Siliga signed with the Salt Lake Stallions of the Alliance of American Football. The league ceased operations in April 2019.

Siliga was selected by the Dallas Renegades in the 2020 XFL draft.
