= Winston Reid (American football) =

American football player (born 1999)

No. 59 – Cleveland Browns
- Position: Linebacker
- Roster status: Active

Personal information
- Born: August 3, 1999 (age 27); Salt Lake City, Utah, U.S.
- Listed height: 6 ft 0 in (1.83 m)
- Listed weight: 225 lb (102 kg)

Career information
- High school: Copper Hills (St. George, Utah)
- College: Weber State (2017–2023)
- NFL draft: 2024: undrafted

Career history
- Cleveland Browns (2024–present)

Awards and highlights
- First-team All-Big Sky (2023)

Career NFL statistics as of 2024
- Total tackles: 23
- Sacks: 0.5
- Fumble recoveries: 1
- Pass deflections: 2
- Stats at Pro Football Reference

Winston Reid (born August 3, 1999) is an American professional football linebacker for the Cleveland Browns of the National Football League (NFL). He played college football for the Weber State Wildcats.

== Early life ==
Reid was born on August 3, 1999, in Salt Lake City, Utah, to Mike and Lau Reid. He attended Copper Hills High School in West Jordan, Utah.

== College career ==
Reid initially joined the Weber State Wildcats as a walk-on before earning a scholarship. During Reid's seven-year collegiate career he played in 47 games and totaled 281 tackles with 28.5 being for a loss, and seven sacks, while also being named an FCS All-American and earning all-conference honors.

== Professional career ==
Pre-draft measurables
Height	Weight	Arm length	Hand span	Wingspan	40-yard dash	10-yard split	20-yard split	20-yard shuttle	Three-cone drill	Vertical jump	Broad jump	Bench press
5 ft 11 3/4 in (1.82 m)	223 lb (101 kg)	31 3/4 in (0.81 m)	10 in (0.25 m)	6 ft 4 3/8 in (1.94 m)	4.68 s	1.62 s	2.67 s	4.58 s	7.32 s	33.5 in (0.85 m)	10 ft 0 in (3.05 m)	33 reps
All values from Pro Day

After not being selected in the 2024 NFL draft, Reid signed with the Cleveland Browns as an undrafted free agent. On August 27, 2024, Reid was released during final roster cuts, but signed back to the team's practice squad a day later. On September 14, Reid was signed to the Browns active roster for their Week 2 matchup against the Jacksonville Jaguars.

On April 8, 2025, Reid signed his exclusive rights free agent tender with the Browns.

On April 6, 2026, Reid re-signed with the Browns.
