= M&A Source =

- Founded: 1991
- Location: Atlanta, Georgia
- Website: M&A Source

M&A Source is a non-profit professional organization for middle market business intermediaries that provides training and education for small to mid-size business mergers and acquisitions intermediaries. Founded in 1991 as a division of the IBBA, M&A Source comprises over 440 intermediaries across the world. M&A Source's mission is "to promote members' professional development and interests to better serve their clients' needs, and maximize public awareness of professional intermediary services available for middle market merger and acquisition transactions." Due to the esoteric nature of the industry, before the creation of the M&A Source there was no organization that was able to provide education for small to mid-sized business intermediaries. As such, M&A source was founded with the goal of promoting members' professional development and interests to better serve their clients' needs, and maximize public awareness of professional intermediary services available for middle market merger and acquisition transactions.

== Certification ==
The M&A Source offers a number of courses and seminars to educate business intermediaries as well as the general public on the industry. The M&A Source offers a designation called a Merger & Acquisition Master Intermediary which is signifies the holder of the designation as an experienced intermediary who has completed an exhaustive course curriculum and proven to be the broker of record for at least 3 business transactions of over one million dollars in enterprise value each. On top of this, the M&A Source runs many specific training seminars as well as presentations and workshops by expert M&A guest speakers.

== Achievements ==
Certified by the National Association of State Boards of Accountancy (NASBA)
