= Copper Hills High School =

Location
- 5445 New Bingham Highway; West Jordan, UT 84088; 40°35′39″N 112°01′11″W

Information
- Type: Public
- Motto: "May what is best for students govern our actions."
- Established: 1995
- School district: Jordan School District
- Principal: Matt Tranter
- Faculty: 121.59 (FTE)
- Grades: 10-12
- Enrollment: 2,837 (2024-2025)
- Student to teacher ratio: 23.33
- Colors: Forest green, navy blue
- Fight song: CHHS Fight Song
- Athletics: Football, basketball, lacrosse, men's soccer, softball, swimming, tennis
- Mascot: Grizzly
- Website: Copper Hills H.S.

Copper Hills High School is located in West Jordan, Utah, United States, situated just east of the Oquirrh Mountains in the southwest corner of the Salt Lake Valley near the Bingham Canyon Copper Mine. It is part of the Jordan School District. The school opened in fall 1995 and has an enrollment of 2,837.

== Academics ==
Copper Hills offers concurrent enrollment classes at the school via Salt Lake Community College. Students attend the college-level classes at Copper Hills for either a quarter, semester, or full year (depending on the class). Credit is received based on overall grade performance and, in most cases, a cumulative exam of the information learned in the class. Additionally, Copper Hills offers nationwide Advanced Placement (AP) classes to its students.

Starting in the 2006–2007 school year, the school required students to take "Partner Adults With Students" (PAWS). PAWS was a mandatory 30-minute class taken every Wednesday where students discussed concerns an issues with their teachers, who would provide further instruction on a provided topic.

Starting in the 2007–2008 school year, Copper Hills included five academies within the school: Business and Information Technology, Performing Arts/Crafts, Industry/Mathematics and Science, English/Social Studies, and Athletics. All students were required to choose an academy. The school grouped students of the same academy to take classes geared toward that particular academy. The high school no longer has these academies.

=== Test scores ===
American College Test (ACT)

School year	2004–2005	2003–2004	2002–2003	2001–2002	2000–2001
School composite	21.7	21.3	21.1	21.4	21.4
District composite	22.0	22.0	21.8	21.8	21.8
Utah composite	21.5	21.5	21.3	21.4	21.4
National composite	20.9	20.9	20.8	20.8	21.0
Data is from Jordan School District website.

Advanced Placement Test (AP)

School year	2004–2005	2003–2004	2002–2003	2001–2002	2000–2001
School % passing	72	69	69	69	72
District % passing	70.9	75.2	70.8	70.0	70.3
State % passing	65.5	68.1	67.2	69.0	66.1
National % passing	59.6	61.6	61.7	63.0	61.6
Data is from Jordan School District website.

== Orchestra program ==
The orchestra program at Copper Hills High School is currently under the direction of Zane Lowry, having previously been directed by Jenna Baumgart (2005-2024). The program consists primarily of 2 orchestras: the Chamber Orchestra (combined with the West Jordan High School Chamber Orchestra and being auditioned) and the Concert Orchestra (non-auditioned). The program has received many superior ratings at the state and regional level since 2002. Recently, the combined Copper Hills/West Jordan Chamber Orchestra received straight superior ratings from their participation in the 2025 UMEA State Orchestra festival, held at Highland High School in Utah.

In the 2006–2007 school year, the Chamber Orchestra attended a tour of San Diego, California, playing Handel's Concerto Grosso 1 as well as Paul Hindemith's Acht Stuke. They achieved superior ratings at the Utah State level competition for orchestras held at Bingham.

== Band program ==
The band program at Copper Hills High School consists of Concert Band, Symphonic Band, Wind Symphony, Junior Varsity Jazz, Varsity Jazz, Winter Percussion, Winter Junior Varsity and Varsity Colorguards, and The Mighty Marching Grizzlies. Varsity Jazz received a superior rating at the state level in the 2025-2026 year. The Mighty Marching Grizzlies are set to perform in the Disneyland Parade on October 19th, 2026 in the California Disneyland Park.

== Broadcasting/video production program ==
The broadcasting and video production program is currently led and taught by Kamiko Adcock and is known as "CH Studios". The broadcasting team won Best Live Event at the 2020-2021 Broadcast Awards for their CHHS Madrigals livestream.

== Choir program ==
The Concert Choir and Madrigal choirs are led and conducted by Marc Taylor, and have attained many region, state, and national titles.

The choral department is one of the largest in the school. It includes the Concert Choir (made up of more than 90 students), Madrigal Choir (made up of 20 to 28 students), Mixed Choir (made up of more than 60 students), Men's Choir and Ladies' Choir.

== Donation center ==
In 2016, the school made both local and national headlines for a donation center founded by teacher Rickee Stewart and based in the school. Stewart began the donation center after asking for donations for homeless and impoverished students in the area instead of gifts for her upcoming wedding. Since then, the donation center has been featured in various media outlets such as NBC Nightly News, People, and the Ellen DeGeneres Show. In 2017, Stewart made an appearance on Rachael Ray in which Ray, in association with Burlington Coat Factory, donated 1,000 winter coats for those who unable to afford one, and $10,000 to the school.

== Athletics ==
State championships

- 2000, boys' basketball (5A)
- 2013, drill team
- 2013, softball
- 2013, color guard, AA division
- 2014, drill team
- 2014, color guard, Scholastic Regional A division
- 2015, drill team
- 2016, drill team
- 2016, racquetball
- 2017, drill team
- 2017, debate
- 2018, drill team
- 2018, Cheer, (Fight Song)
- 2018 Hockey
- 2018, debate
- 2019, debate
- 2018, drill team

National championships

- 2010, drill team, 2nd at Nationals
- 2011, drill team, 1st at Nationals

== Dance controversy ==
In 2004, the school adopted a "policy requiring same-sex couples to get parental permission before attending school dances." This prompted a complaint from the ACLU on December 7, 2004. Two weeks later, the school revoked the policy.

== Drill team controversy ==
In 2016, after winning the Utah State Drill Team 5A Championship, drill team head coach Shannon Mortensen was investigated by the Utah High School Activities Association (UHSAA) for collusion with the judges among other charges. Coach Mortensen was ultimately placed on probation along with Copper Hills High School as a result of the investigation.

== Allegations of racism ==
During the 2020–21 school year, a daycare assistant posted a photo of herself in blackface on Facebook. She was later terminated from the position by the Jordan School District.

== Notable alumni ==
- Sealver Siliga, class of 2008; player in the National Football League
- Roni Jones-Perry, class of 2015; player for the United States women's national volleyball team
- Winston Reid, class of 2017; player in the National Football League
- Brayden Taylor, class of 2020; college baseball player
