= Elecom Kobe Finies =

Logo

General information
- Founded: 1978
- Headquartered: Kobe, Japan
- Colours: Navy blue and silver
- Website: http://www.finies.com/

Personnel
- General manager: Tatsuya Nagai
- Head coach: Hirotaka Fujimoto

League / conference affiliations
- X-League; X1 Super Division

The Elecom Kobe Finies are an American football team located in the Kobe, Japan. It is a member of the X-League.

== Team history ==
- 1975 Team founded. First named Kohaku Finies.
- 1976 Team promoted from X2 to X1.
- 1986 Team named changed to Sunstar Finies.
- 1991 Advanced to the Tokyo Super Bowl Lost to Onward Oaks 49-10.
- 1993 Advanced to the Tokyo Super Bowl for the 2nd time. Lost to Asahi Beer Silver Star 13-0.
- 1996 Advanced to the Semifinals. Lost to the Onward Oaks 21-7.
- 1999 Sunstar ends sponsorship with the Finies. Team name reverts to the Kohaku Finies.
- 2005 Team named changed to SRC Kobe Finies.
- 2009 Sponsorship agreement signed with Elecom Co., Ltd. Team named changed to Elecom Kobe Finies.

== Seasons ==
X-League champions (1987–present)	Division champions	Final stage/semifinals berth	Wild card /2nd stage berth

Season	League	Division	Regular Season				Post Season Results	Awards	Head coaches
Season	League	Division	Finish	Wins	Losses	Ties	Post Season Results	Awards	Head coaches
2003	X2	West	1st	5	0	0	Won X2-X1 promotion match (Iwatani)		Hamada
2004	X1	West	5th	1	5	0			Hamada
2005	X1	West	6th	0	5	0			
2006	X1	West	4th	1	4	0			
2007	X1	West	5th	2	6	0			
2008	X1	West	4th	2	4	0			
2009	X1	West	4th	3	4	0	Lost 2nd stage relegation match (As One) 17-22; Won 2nd stage relegation match (Asahi Pretec) 44-0		
2010	X1	West	4th	3	4	0	Won 2nd stage relegation match (Nagoya) 23-15; Won 2nd stage relegation match (As One) 26-21		
2011	X1	West	4th	3	4	0	Lost 2nd stage relegation match (Fuji Xerox) 3-6; Won 2nd stage relegation match (Nagoya) 17-0		
2012	X1	West	4th	2	5	0	Won 2nd stage relegation match (Nishinomiya) 21-7; Won 2nd stage relegation match (Nagoya) 23-9		Yonemura
2013	X1	West	4th	3	4	0	Won 2nd stage relegation match (Nagoya) 34-6; Won 2nd stage relegation match (Nishinomiya) 42-7; Lost Battle 9 Final match (at All Mitsubishi 21-24		Araki
2014	X1	West	1st	5	2	0	Lost 2nd stage match (at Nojima) 14-21; Lost 2nd stage match (Obic) 0-45		Ryota Kano
2015	X1	West	3rd	4	4	0	Lost 2nd stage match (Fujitsu) 7-28; Lost 2nd stage match (Lixil Deers) 8-35		Ryota Kano
2016	X1	West	2nd	3	5	0	Won Wildcard match (All Mitsubishi) 20-6; Lost Quarterfinals match (at Obic) 0-35		Ryota Kano
2017	X1	West	2nd	4	4	0	Won Wildcard match (AS ONE) 47-17; Lost Quarterfinals match (at Fujitsu) 7-34		Ryota Kano
2018	X1	West	2nd	5	4	0	Lost Quarterfinals match (IBM) 23-34		Toshiaki Yokekura
2019	X1	Super	4th	4	5	1	Lost Semifinals match (at Fujitsu) 13-31		Toshiaki Yokekura
2020	X1	Super	5th	1	2	0			Toshiaki Yokekura
2021	X1	Super	7th	0	5	1			Toshiaki Yokekura
2022	X1 Super	Div. B	3rd	4	2	1	Won Quarterfinals match (at IBM) 35-21; Lost Semifinals match (at Fujitsu) 21-39		Toshiaki Yokekura
2023	X1 Super	Div. B	3rd	3	2	1	Lost Quarterfinals match (at Obic) 7-17		Masaki Tokimoto
2024	X1 Super		7th	3	4	1	Lost Quarterfinals match (at Panasonic) 3-24		Masaki Tokimoto
2025	X1 Super	West	3rd	4	4	1	Lost Quarterfinals match (at Obic) 7-10		Hirotaka Fujimoto
Total				65	83	6	(2003–2025, includes only regular season)		
Total				12	15	0	(2003–2025, includes only playoffs)		
Total				77	98	6	(2003–2025, includes both regular season and playoffs)		

== Current import players ==
Jersey #	Name	Position	Years with the team	Alma mater	Achievements
#0	Colby Campbell	LB	2025–present	Duke University	
#8	Miki Suguturaga	DE	2025–present	University of Utah	All X1 Super Team member (2025)
#5	David Pindell	QB	2022–present	University of Connecticut	

Former import players

Name	Position	Years with the team	Alma mater	Achievements
Damien Williams	DE	2024	Merrimack College	
Malone Martaele	WR	2024	University of Utah	
Isaiah Pierre	DB	2021–2023	Western New Mexico University	
Brandon McKinney	SS	2022–2023	University of Utah	All X-1 Super team member (2022)
Theo Howard	WR	2023	University of Utah	
Lyle Moevao	QB	2012	Oregon State	
Brysen Ginlack	OG	2012–2013	Hawai'i	
Daniel Bukarau	OT	2012–2014	Utah	
Rocky Pouta-Alo	FS/RB	2012–2014	Indiana State	
Inoke Funaki	QB	2013–2015	Hawai'i	
Tyler Osborne	DE	2014–2015	Southern Utah	
Tommy Gaul	C	2015	Iowa	
Dustin Martin	DE	2015–2016	Weber State	
Gavin Farr	OG	2016	Southern Utah	
Jordan Canzeri	RB	2016–2017	Iowa	
Wade Hansen	OT	2017	Virginia Tech	
Alex Pace	DT	2017	Cincinnati	
Sean Draper	CB	2016–2020	Iowa	All X-League Team member (2019, 2020)
Anas Hasic	WR	2018	West Florida	
Calvin Heurtelou	DT	2018	Miami (FL)	
Cody Sokol	QB	2018–2021	Louisiana Tech	All X-League Team member (2018)
Alfonso Onunwor	WR	2019–2021	Idaho	3x All X-League Super team member (2019–2021)
Cardell Rawlings	DL	2019–2021	Wingate	All X-League Super team member (2020)
Devin Phelps	WR	2022	Shepherd University	
