= Jim Finn =

American football player (born 1976)

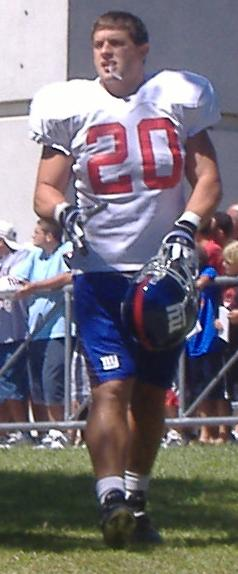
- Finn with the New York Giants in 2007

No. 20, 36
- Position: Fullback

Personal information
- Born: December 9, 1976 (age 49); Teaneck, New Jersey, U.S.
- Listed height: 6 ft 0 in (1.83 m)
- Listed weight: 245 lb (111 kg)

Career information
- High school: Bergen Catholic (Oradell, New Jersey)
- College: Penn
- NFL draft: 1999: 7th round, 253rd overall pick

Career history
- Chicago Bears (1999)*; Indianapolis Colts (2000–2002); New York Giants (2003–2007)
- * Offseason or practice squad member only

Awards and highlights
- Super Bowl champion (XLII); Ivy League Player of the Year (1998); 2× first-team All-Ivy League (1997, 1998)

Career NFL statistics
- Rushing attempts: 11
- Rushing yards: 30
- Receptions: 60
- Receiving yards: 423
- Receiving touchdowns: 1
- Stats at Pro Football Reference

James Finn Jr. (born December 9, 1976) is an American former professional football player who was a fullback in the National Football League (NFL). He played college football for the Penn Quakers and was selected by the Chicago Bears as the final pick of the 1999 NFL draft.

== Early life ==
Finn was born in Teaneck, New Jersey and grew up in Fair Lawn, New Jersey. He attended Bergen Catholic High School in Oradell, New Jersey, where he was involved in both football and wrestling. An All-State pick in both sports, he was the 189-pound class state champion and posted a 33–2 record as a senior. Because no Division I-A recruiters were seeking him, Finn sought a Division I-AA program and committed with the University of Pennsylvania.

== College career ==
Finn was a four-year letterman while playing college football at the University of Pennsylvania, where he accumulated 2,277 rushing yards, which ranks as the fourth-highest total in school history. He also scored 180 points for fifth on the all-time list. He was an All-Ivy League player as a senior and junior. In his senior season, Finn set school records for yards, rushing attempts, and rushing touchdowns.

Penn first experimented with having Finn play both offense and defense on October 18, 1997, against Columbia. In that game, Finn ran for 138 yards on 24 carries including one touchdown for 15 yards but fumbled on Columbia's 3-yard line on a 50-yard run. With the 24–7 win, Penn beat Columbia for the first time since 1994.

In addition to being named an All-Ivy Team member, Finn was named Player of the Year. He also holds school records for most rushing attempts, rushing yards, and touchdowns in a game. Before being converted permanently into a fullback, Finn briefly played as a safety, even starting a few games as a sophomore. While at Penn, Finn became a member of the Sigma Chi fraternity. Finn also attended the Wharton School at Penn and graduated with a degree in finance in 1999.

== Professional career ==
=== Pre-draft ===
Pre-draft measurables
Height	Weight	40-yard dash	10-yard split	20-yard split	20-yard shuttle	Three-cone drill	Vertical jump	Broad jump	Bench press
5 ft 10 in (1.78 m)	228 lb (103 kg)	4.62 s	1.63 s	2.68 s	4.21 s	7.18 s	31.5 in (0.80 m)	9 ft 0 in (2.74 m)	24 reps
All values from NFL Combine.

=== Playing history ===
Finn was selected as the final pick of the 1999 NFL draft (nicknamed Mr. Irrelevant) by the Chicago Bears. He was waived and spent time on their practice squad. Finn signed with the Indianapolis Colts in early 2000 where he ran for 44 yards in six rushing attempts and 10 receptions over three seasons. In 2003, Finn signed with the New York Giants. In his Giants career, Finn had 21 rushing yards from five attempts. He saw more action as a receiver out of the backfield, with 325 receiving yards and 42 receptions.

In 2005, Finn played in all 16 regular season games with 13 starts including the NFC National Football League playoffs wild card game against the Carolina Panthers. His blocks for Tiki Barber helped Barber rush for a franchise-record 1,860 yards. Finn was primarily a blocking fullback for the Giants.

Finn missed the entire 2007 New York Giants season after being placed on injured reserve. That year, he became a Super Bowl champion when the Giants won Super Bowl XLII. After the season, Finn was cut due to nagging injuries and the emergence of Madison Hedgecock.

Finn and Brandon Stokley are the only players in NFL history to have caught an offensive pass from both Eli Manning and Peyton Manning.

== Personal life ==
He is the son of James and Jane Finn. Finn married actress Rosa Blasi on February 14, 2004, in Maui, Hawaii. They had one daughter Kaia (September 20, 2006) and divorced in 2008.

Finn is a resident in Los Angeles County, California. He has also lived in Fair Lawn, New Jersey.

Finn was a named plaintiff in one of the lawsuits filed by former NFL players against the league, alleging that the NFL had failed to warn its players about the risk of long term damage from repeated concussions incurred from playing football.
