= Fuji Xerox J-Stars =

American football team in Itami, Japan

General information
- Founded: 1985
- Headquartered: Itami, Hyogo, Japan
- Colors: Red and White
- Website: http://www.team-jstars.jp/

Personnel
- General manager: Toshiharu Kato
- Head coach: Masahide Mitsuyoshi

League / conference affiliations
- X-League; West

The Fuji Xerox J-Stars are an American football team located in Itami, Hyogo, Japan. They are a member of the X-League.

== Team history ==
- 1985 Team founded by members of the Fuji Xerox Osaka group.
- 1989 Joined the X-League.
- 2010 Promoted from X2 to X1 for the following season.
- 2011 Finished 6th in the West Division (0 wins, 7 losses). Lost X2-X1 replacement game to the Hankyu Bruins 5–25. Demoted from X1 to X2 for the following season.
- 2015 Due to the Nishinomiya Bruins finishing 0–2 in the Green Bowl Spring tournament, the J-Stars were promoted to X1 for the Fall tournament. Finished 6th in the West division (0 wins, 7 losses). Lost X2-X1 replacement game to the Sidewinders 10–17. Demoted to X2 for the following season.

== Seasons ==
X-League champions (1987–present)	Division champions	Final Stage/Semifinals Berth	Wild Card /First Stage Berth

Season	League	Division	Regular Season				Postseason results	Awards	Head coaches
Season	League	Division	Finish	Wins	Losses	Ties	Postseason results	Awards	Head coaches
2008	X2	West	2nd	4	1	0			
2009	X2	West	2nd	9	1	0			
2010	X2	West	1st	6	1	0	Won X2-X1 promotion match (Nagoya) 28–8		
2011	X1	West	6th	1	7	0	Won 2nd stage relegation match (Elecom Kobe) 6–3; Lost 2nd stage relegation match (Nagoya) 16–23; Lost X1-X2 replacement match (Hankyu) 5–25		
2012	X2	West	1st	7	1	0	Lost X2-X1 promotion match (Nishinomiya) 20–23 OT		Masahide Mitsuyoshi
2013	X2	West	1st	5	3	0	Lost X2-X1 promotion match (at Nagoya) 7–21		Masahide Mitsuyoshi
2014	X2	West	1st	5	1	0	Lost X2-X1 promotion match (Nishinomiya) 0–30		Masahide Mitsuyoshi
2015	X1	West	6th	2	6	0	Lost 2nd stage relegation match (As One) 0–73; Lost 2nd stage relegation match (at Nagoya) 9–10; Lost X1-X2 replacement match (at Sidewinders) 10–17		Masahide Mitsuyoshi
Total							(2009–2015, includes only regular season)		
Total							(2009–2015, includes only playoffs)		
Total							(2009–2015, includes both regular season and playoffs)		
