= Green Bowl =

Final game of a Japanese annual American football tournament

- グリーンボウル
- Stadium: Kobe Prince Stadium
- Operated: 1960–present
- Conference tie-ins: X-League

The Green Bowl (グリーンボウル) is the final game of an annual American football tournament played in Japan, during spring, between members of the X-League from western Japan.

== Game results ==
Year	Champion	Runner-up	Score	Venue	Location	Attendance	Winning Head Coach
2006	Asahi Soft Drink Challengers	As One Black Eagles	48-0	Nagai Stadium	Osaka, Japan	1,056	Masato Takahashi
2007							
2008	Panasonic Denko Impulse	Asahi Soft Drink Challengers	38-7	Tension Stadium		1,667	
2009	Asahi Soft Drink Challengers	Panasonic Denko Impulse	69-14				
2010							
2011	Panasonic Impulse	Asahi Soft Drink Challengers	16-14	Kobe Prince Stadium		851	
2012	Panasonic Impulse	Asahi Soft Drink Challengers	34-3	Kobe Prince Stadium		1,236	Nobuyoshi Araki
2013	Asahi Soft Drink Challengers	Panasonic Impulse	16-8	Kobe Prince Stadium	Kobe, Japan	762	
2014	Panasonic Impulse	Asahi Soft Drinks Challengers	35-7	Kobe Prince Stadium		1,432	Nobuyoshi Araki
2015	Panasonic Impulse	Elecom Kobe Finies	42-2	Kobe Prince Stadium		960	Nobuyoshi Araki
2016	Panasonic Impulse	Elecom Kobe Finies	34-3	Kobe Prince Stadium		1,100	Nobuyoshi Araki
2017
2018
2019
2020							
