= David Hale (American football) =

American football player (born 1983)

No. 76, 62
- Position: Guard

Personal information
- Born: March 3, 1983 (age 43); Plain City, Utah, U.S.
- Listed height: 6 ft 6 in (1.98 m)
- Listed weight: 315 lb (143 kg)

Career information
- High school: Fremont (Plain City)
- College: Weber State
- NFL draft: 2008: 4th round, 133rd overall pick

Career history
- Baltimore Ravens (2008–2009)
- Stats at Pro Football Reference

David Hale (born March 3, 1983) is an American former professional football offensive lineman. Hale was selected by the Baltimore Ravens in the fourth round of the 2008 NFL draft with the 133rd overall pick. He attended Fremont High School and played college football at Weber State University. He played two full seasons for the Ravens, playing center and guard, and also on special teams. After a back injury in the preseason of 2010, the Ravens released Hale with an injury settlement.

== Personal life ==
He is a member of the Church of Jesus Christ of Latter-day Saints. He served a religious mission in the Dominican Republic from 2002 to 2004 and speaks fluent Spanish. Hale was married in June 2007 to Shelby Walford a former volleyball player for Weber State University.

He is also the first cousin of musician/music producer Gregg Hale. Hale was the youngest known player drafted into the PC Dunkball league in 1992, playing an impressive 5 seasons when the league was disbanded in 1996.
