= Nagoya Cyclones =

American football team in Nagoya, Japan

General information
- Founded: 1980
- Headquartered: Nagoya, Aichi, Japan
- Colors: Navy Blue and Orange
- Mascot: Fu-tan
- Website: http://www.cyclones.jp

Personnel
- General manager: Naoya Tanigawa
- Head coach: Masaki Kobayashi

League / conference affiliations
- X-League; West Division

The Nagoya Cyclones are an American football team located in Nagoya, Aichi, Japan. They are a member of the X-League.

== Seasons ==
X-League champions (1987–present)	Division champions	Final Stage/Semifinals Berth	Wild Card /First Stage Berth

Season	League	Division	Regular Season				Postseason results	Awards	Head coaches
Season	League	Division	Finish	Wins	Losses	Ties	Postseason results	Awards	Head coaches
2009	X2	West	1st	6	1	0	Won X2-X1 promotion match (Asahi Pretec) 10-0		
2010	X1	West	6th	0	7	0	Lost 2nd stage relegation match (Elecom Kobe) 15-23; Lost 2nd stage relegation match (As One) 6-30; Lost X1-X2 replacement game (Fuji Xerox)8-28		
2011	X1	West	5th	2	5	0	Won 2nd stage relegation match (Fuji Xerox) 23-16; Lost 2nd stage relegation match (Elecom Kobe) 0-17		
2012	X1	West	5th	2	5	0	Won 2nd stage relegation match (Nishinomiya)20-7; Lost 2nd stage relegation match (at Elecom Kobe) 9-23		
2013	X1	West	6th	2	5	0	Lost 2nd stage relegation match (at Elecom Kobe) 6-34; Lost 2nd stage match (at Nishinomiya) 7-10; Won X1-X2 replacement match (Fuji Xerox) 21-7		
2014	X1	West	5th	2	5	0	Lost 2nd stage relegation match (Nishinomiya) 10-13; Lost 2nd stage relegation match (at As One) 12-36.		Masanori Sugiura
2015	X1	West	5th	3	4	0	Won 2nd stage relegation match (Fuji Xerox) 10-9; Lost 2nd stage relegation match (at As One) 0-44		Masanori Sugiura
2016	X1	West	5th	4	4	0			Masanori Sugiura
2017	X1	West	5th	4	3	1			Masanori Sugiura
2018	X1	West	5th	3	5	0			Masanori Sugiura
2019	X1 Area	West	3rd	5	3	0			Masanori Sugiura
2020	X1 Area	West	4th	0	2	0			Masanori Sugiura
2021	X1 Area	West	4th	1	5	0			Masaki Kobayashi
2022	X1 Area		6th	4	5	0	Won X1 Area-X2 Relegation match (Club Hawkeye) 31-7		Masaki Kobayashi
2023	X1 Area		6th	4	5	0			Masaki Kobayashi
2024	X1 Area	West	2nd	2	3	0			Masaki Kobayashi
2025	X1 Area	West	1st	6	1	1			Masaki Kobayashi
Total				49	63	2	(2009–2025, includes only regular season)		
Total				6	10	0	(2009–2025, includes only playoffs)		
Total				55	73	2	(2009–2025, includes both regular season and playoffs)		
