= Ryan Prince =

American football player (born 1977)

No. 89
- Position: Tight end

Personal information
- Born: May 16, 1977 (age 49); Farmington, Utah, U.S.
- Listed height: 6 ft 4 in (1.93 m)
- Listed weight: 265 lb (120 kg)

Career information
- High school: Davis
- College: Weber State
- NFL draft: 2001: undrafted

Career history
- Jacksonville Jaguars (2001); Oakland Raiders (2003)*; San Diego Chargers (2004)*; St. Louis Rams (2004)*
- * Offseason or practice squad member only
- Stats at Pro Football Reference

Ryan Scott Prince (born May 16, 1977) is an American former professional football player who was a tight end for the Jacksonville Jaguars of the National Football League (NFL). He played college football for the Weber State Wildcats.
