= Cam Quayle =

American football player (born 1972)

No. 86
- Position: Tight end

Personal information
- Born: September 24, 1972 (age 54); Ogden, Utah, U.S.
- Listed height: 6 ft 7 in (2.01 m)
- Listed weight: 255 lb (116 kg)

Career information
- High school: Ogden (UT) Ben Lomond
- College: Weber State
- NFL draft: 1998: 7th round, 241st overall pick

Career history
- Baltimore Ravens (1998)*; Jacksonville Jaguars (1998)*; Barcelona Dragons (1998–1999)
- * Offseason or practice squad member only

Cameron Pean Quayle (born September 24, 1972) is an American former professional football tight end. He was selected with the final pick in the 1998 NFL draft, earning him the title of Mr. Irrelevant. The Baltimore Ravens draftee went to Weber State University where he was a tight end. Quayle retired from football after a neck injury and pursued a career as a pediatric dentist.

== College career ==
At Weber State, Quayle caught 149 passes for 1,414 yards and 10 touchdowns.

== Professional career ==
Quayle was selected in the seventh round by the Baltimore Ravens in the 1998 NFL draft as the 241st overall pick, earning the title Mr. Irrelevant a title given to the last player picked in the NFL Draft. Quayle failed to make the team, being released during final cuts on August 26, 1998.

Quayle was picked up by the Jacksonville Jaguars, who allocated him to the Barcelona Dragons in NFL Europe. He played 10 games in NFL Europe before injuring his neck and retiring.

== Personal life ==
Quayle was accepted to dental school at Virginia Commonwealth University in 1998, but declined to attend to pursue an NFL career. After a neck injury ended his football career, he graduated with a doctorate in dental surgery in 2004 from VCU. He then returned to Utah, where he completed his residency at a children's hospital in Salt Lake City. He is now the owner and head dentist of Mountain View Pediatric Dentistry in Pleasant View and Farmington. Quayle is married and has two sons and two daughters. As of February 2018, he has taken a one year leave in his career to provide free dental care to individuals in Guatemala.
