= Tim Toone =

American football player (born 1985)

No. 18, 17
- Position: Wide receiver

Personal information
- Born: February 14, 1985 (age 41); Peoria, Arizona, U.S.
- Listed height: 5 ft 10 in (1.78 m)
- Listed weight: 185 lb (84 kg)

Career information
- High school: Peoria
- College: Weber State (2003, 2006–2009)
- NFL draft: 2010: 7th round, 255th overall pick

Career history
- Detroit Lions (2010−2011)*; Buffalo Bills (2011)*; Denver Broncos (2012)*; Atlanta Falcons (2012−2013); New Orleans Saints (2013)*
- * Offseason or practice squad member only

Awards and highlights
- FCS First-team All-American (2009)
- Stats at Pro Football Reference

Timothy Lee Toone (born February 14, 1985) is an American former professional football player who was a wide receiver in the National Football League (NFL). He was selected by the Detroit Lions with the final pick (255th overall) of the 2010 NFL draft, earning the title of Mr. Irrelevant. He played two years of NCAA Division I FCS college football for the Weber State Wildcats in Ogden, Utah.

== College career ==
After serving a two-year mission to West Africa for the Church of Jesus Christ of Latter-day Saints, Toone began a four-year college football career with the Weber State Wildcats.

In his first Wildcats season, Toone had more punt returns (10) than catches (7) but had 275 yards and 2 touchdowns receiving with 95 yards and a touchdown returning punts. He finished with an average of 39.28 yards per reception (34.37 yards per game).

Toone had a more productive season as a wide receiver in his second season with 32 catches, 698 yards, and 10 touchdowns, having started all 11 games for the Wildcats (12 of 19 games started in his two seasons). He averaged 63.45 yards per game (21.81 yards per reception and 2.9 receptions per game) and had 10 touchdowns.

Heading into the 2010 NFL draft, Toone finished his college career with 1,100 total yards (973 receiving and 127 punt returning) and 13 touchdowns (12 receiving and 1 punt return). In his March 2010 Pro Day, Toone posted a 4.42 second 40-yard dash time and a vertical jump of 36 inches.

== Professional career ==
=== Detroit Lions ===
Toone was selected in the seventh round as the 255th and final selection of the 2010 NFL draft by the Detroit Lions, thus earning the moniker Mr. Irrelevant. On September 4, 2010, Toone was one of the final cuts as Detroit reduced its roster to the 53-man limit. However, the Lions re-signed Toone to their practice squad the next day.

Toone was placed on the practice squad's injured reserve due to an undisclosed injury on October 7, 2010. He was re-signed to a future contract on January 5, 2011. Toone was waived during final cuts on September 3, and re-signed to the Lions' practice squad on September 21. The Detroit Lions released Toone again on September 27, 2011.

=== Buffalo Bills ===
On October 11, 2011, the Buffalo Bills signed Toone to their practice squad.

=== Denver Broncos ===
On January 10, 2012, the Denver Broncos signed Toone to the practice squad. Toone was waived on April 30, 2012.

=== Atlanta Falcons ===
Toone was signed by the Atlanta Falcons on July 25, 2012. He made the 53-man roster for the first time. He was cut on September 6, 2012, due to a hamstring pull, but later re-signed on November 13, 2012. On July 23, 2013, Toone was waived by the Atlanta Falcons.

=== New Orleans Saints ===
On July 30, 2013, Toone was signed by the New Orleans Saints. On August 27, 2013, he was waived by the Saints.

== Post-playing career ==
As of 2020, Toone works as an ICU nurse in Arizona.
