= Jeff Carlson (American football) =

American football player (born 1966)

No. 15, 7, 12, 17
- Position: Quarterback

Personal information
- Born: April 23, 1966 (age 60); Long Beach, California, U.S.
- Listed height: 6 ft 3 in (1.91 m)
- Listed weight: 213 lb (97 kg)

Career information
- High school: Pacifica (Garden Grove, California)
- College: Weber State
- NFL draft: 1989: 4th round, 102nd overall pick

Career history
- Los Angeles Rams (1989)*; Tampa Bay Buccaneers (1990–1991); New York Giants (1992)*; New England Patriots (1992); Denver Broncos (1994)*
- * Offseason or practice squad member only

Career NFL statistics
- Passing attempts: 114
- Passing completions: 49
- Completion percentage: 43.0%
- TD–INT: 2–9
- Passing yards: 636
- Passer rating: 34.1
- Stats at Pro Football Reference

Jeffrey Allen Carlson (born April 23, 1966) is an American former professional football player who was a quarterback in the National Football League (NFL). He played three seasons for the Tampa Bay Buccaneers and New England Patriots. He played college football for the Weber State Wildcats.

== Early life ==
Carlson was born on April 23, 1966, in Long Beach, California. He played quarterback at Pacifica High School in Garden Grove, California. During his senior year, Carlson led Pacifica to the Empire League Championship and was named the leagues most valuable player.

== College career ==
Carlson played college football at Weber State University from 1984 to 1988.

== Professional career ==
=== Los Angeles Rams ===
Carlson was selected by the Los Angeles Rams in the fourth round (102nd overall) in the 1989 NFL draft. He competed to be the backup to Rams starting quarterback Jim Everett.

=== Tampa Bay Buccaneers ===
After joining the Tampa Bay Buccaneers in 1990, Carlson made his NFL debut in a 41-10 blowout loss to the San Diego Chargers. Carlson attempted no passes and fumbled on his lone rushing attempt.

In 1991, he saw more extended playing time. Carlson relieved starting quarterback Chris Chandler during a week 9 matchup against Green Pay Packers. He completed 12-of-32 passes for 164 yards and threw three interceptions in the 27-0 loss. Three weeks later against the Atlanta Falcons, Carlson relieved quarterback Vinny Testeverde. He completed 11-of-15 passes for 164 yards, one touchdown and no interceptions. His first career touchdown pass came on a four yard throw to wide receiver Lawrence Dawsey late in the fourth quarter to prevent a shutout. The Buccaneers went on to lose the game 43-7. He made his first career start week 16 in a 27–0 loss to the Chicago Bears. Carlson completed only 8-of-18 passes for 76 yards and threw three interceptions.

=== New York Giants ===
Carlson had a brief stint with the New York Giants.

=== New England Patriots ===
He joined the New England Patriots midway through the 1992 NFL season. He appeared in three games for the Patriots, including two starts. He completed 18-of-49 passes for 232 yards, one touchdown and three interceptions. He also rushed for 32 yards on 11 attempts.

=== Denver Broncos ===
Carlson signed with the Denver Broncos during the 1994 offseason but never played in a regular season game for the team.

He finished his career appearing in seven games with an 0-3 record as a starter. Carlson completed 49-of-114 passes for 636 yards, two touchdowns and nine interceptions. He rushed 17 times for 57 yards and fumbled 5 times.
