= Andrew Vollert =

American football player (born 1995)

No. 42, 89, 87, 90
- Position: Tight end

Personal information
- Born: March 15, 1995 (age 31); San Francisco, California, U.S.
- Listed height: 6 ft 5 in (1.96 m)
- Listed weight: 235 lb (107 kg)

Career information
- High school: St. Ignatius (San Francisco, California)
- College: Weber State
- NFL draft: 2018: undrafted

Career history
- Arizona Cardinals (2018)*; Cincinnati Bengals (2018)*; Los Angeles Chargers (2019); Carolina Panthers (2020)*; Indianapolis Colts (2020–2021)*
- * Offseason or practice squad member only
- Stats at Pro Football Reference

Andrew Joseph Vollert (born March 15, 1995) is an American former professional football tight end. He played college football at Weber State in Ogden, Utah.

== College career ==
Vollert played ten seasons at San Jose State, followed by year at San Francisco City College, before transferring to Weber State. He was an FCS All-American in 2016 and 2017 for the Wildcats, totaling 156 receptions for 3,000 yards and 27 touchdowns. He also played basketball at San Jose State in the 2014-15 season.

== Professional ==
=== Arizona Cardinals ===
Vollert signed with the Arizona Cardinals as an undrafted free agent on April 30, 2018. In the preseason, he caught 8 of 9 targets for 55 yards. He was waived on September 1, 2018 and was signed to the practice squad the next day. He is currently healthy and was released on October 31, 2018.

=== Cincinnati Bengals ===
On November 5, 2018, Vollert was signed to the Cincinnati Bengals practice squad. He signed a reserve/future contract with the Bengals on December 31, 2018. The Bengals waived Vollert on May 22, 2019.

=== Los Angeles Chargers ===
Vollert was claimed off waivers on May 23, 2019 by the Los Angeles Chargers. After a strong start to camp, he suffered a torn ACL in the preseason and was placed on injured reserve on August 12, 2019. He had one catch for 25 yards before the injury. He was waived on August 1, 2020. His colorful release highlighted HBO's Hard Knocks Season 16 premier.

=== Carolina Panthers ===
On August 16, 2020, Vollert signed with the Carolina Panthers. He was waived four days later.

=== Indianapolis Colts ===
Vollert was claimed off waivers by the Indianapolis Colts on August 21, 2020. He was waived on September 5, 2020. On December 23, 2020, Vollert re-signed with the Colts' practice squad. On December 31, 2020, Vollert was released from the practice squad. On January 10, 2021, Vollert signed a reserve/futures contract with the Colts.

On August 31, 2021, Vollert was hit by a car and waived/injured and placed on injured reserve with an ankle injury. He was released on September 9, 2021 with an injury settlement. Vollert announced his retirement from professional football at the conclusion of the 2021-2022 season.
