= Henry Reed (American football) =

American football player (born 1948)

No. 80
- Positions: Defensive end, linebacker

Personal information
- Born: January 15, 1948 (age 78); Detroit, Michigan, U.S.
- Listed height: 6 ft 3 in (1.91 m)
- Listed weight: 230 lb (104 kg)

Career information
- High school: Northwestern (Detroit)
- College: Iowa Central (1967–1968); Weber State (1969–1970)
- NFL draft: 1971: 10th round, 252nd overall pick

Career history
- New York Giants (1971–1974)

Awards and highlights
- First-team All-American (1970); First-team All-Big Sky (1970)

Career NFL statistics
- Sacks: 9.5
- Fumble recoveries: 2
- Interceptions: 2
- Stats at Pro Football Reference

Henry Elax Reed Jr. (born January 15, 1948) is an American former professional football player who was a defensive end for four seasons with the New York Giants of the National Football League (NFL). He was selected by the Giants in the tenth round of the 1971 NFL draft. He first enrolled at Iowa Central Community College before transferring to play college football for the Weber State Wildcats.

== Early life and college ==
Henry Elax Reed Jr. was born on January 15, 1948, in Detroit, Michigan. He attended Northwestern High School in Detroit.

Reed played college football at Iowa Central Community College from 1967 to 1968, and at Weber State University from 1969 to 1970. He was named a Kodak first-team All-American and a first-team All-Big Sky Conference selection in 1970. He played in the East-West Shrine Game after his senior year. Reed was inducted into the Weber State Athletics Hall of Fame in 2001.

== Professional career ==
Reed was selected by the New York Giants in the 10th round, with the 252nd overall pick, of the 1971 NFL draft. He played in all 14 games, starting nine, as a defensive end during his rookie year in 1971, recording two sacks, one interception, and one fumble recovery. He started all 14 games during the 1972 season, totaling seven sacks and one fumble recovery. Reed moved to linebacker in 1973 and appeared in ten games, starting three, making one interception for 36 yards. He played in 13 games, starting three, as a defensive tackle during his final season in 1974, recording 0.5 sacks. He was released in 1975.
