= Scott Shields (American football) =

American football player (born 1976)

No. 47
- Position: Safety

Personal information
- Born: March 29, 1976 (age 50); San Diego, California, U.S.

Career information
- High school: Bonita Vista (Chula Vista, California)
- College: Weber State
- NFL draft: 1999: 2nd round, 59th overall pick

Career history
- Pittsburgh Steelers (1999–2000); Miami Dolphins (2002)*; Scottish Claymores (2002); Kansas City Chiefs (2004)*
- * Offseason or practice squad member only

Career NFL statistics
- Tackles: 24
- Sacks: 1
- Interceptions: 4
- Stats at Pro Football Reference

Scott Paul Shields (born March 29, 1976) is an American former professional football player who was a safety in the National Football League (NFL). He played college football for the Weber State Wildcats and was selected by the Pittsburgh Steelers in the second round of the 1999 NFL draft. Shields played 26 games for the Steelers over two seasons, with two starts. He was also a member of the Scottish Claymores of NFL Europe.

== College career ==
Before starting college, he went to high school at Bonita Vista High School in Chula Vista, California. Shields played college football at Weber State University from 1995 to 1998. At 6-foot-5 and 225 pounds, he starred at the free safety position, totaling 23 interceptions in his career (a record for his school and the Big Sky Conference). His 10 interceptions during the 1996 season also set a Wildcats record. He also excelled as placekicker, finishing his career with 67 field goals made and 325 total points, both school records. He kicked 5 field goals in one game against Northern Arizona (another school record), and made a 55-yard field goal in another game against Eastern Washington. As a punter, he averaged 41.9 yards per punt over his career, including an 82-yard punt against Cal State Northridge (yet another school record).

He is one of only three football players to earn First Team All-Big Sky Conference in four consecutive seasons. He capped his college career by earning First Team All-American status for Division I-AA, and also received the 1998 National All-Purpose Player of the Year award from The Sports Network. Shields was inducted into the Weber State Sports Hall of Fame in October 2010.
