= Anthony Parker (defensive back, born 1975) =

American football player

No. 26, 21
- Position: Cornerback

Personal information
- Born: December 4, 1975 (age 50); Denver, Colorado, U.S.
- Listed height: 6 ft 1 in (1.85 m)
- Listed weight: 205 lb (93 kg)

Career information
- High school: Thornton (Thornton, Colorado)
- College: Colorado Mesa; Weber State
- NFL draft: 1999: 4th round, 99th overall pick

Career history
- San Francisco 49ers (1999–2002); Oakland Raiders (2003)

Career NFL statistics
- Games played: 21
- Tackles: 36
- Passes deflected: 6
- Stats at Pro Football Reference

Anthony E. Parker (born December 4, 1975) is an American former professional football player who was a cornerback for four seasons with the San Francisco 49ers of the National Football League (NFL). He played college football for the Colorado Mesa Mavericks and Weber State Wildcats. Parker was selected in the fourth round of the 1999 NFL draft with the 99th overall pick. In 2003 he was signed by the Oakland Raiders but suffered a season ending injury.
