= Chris Darrington =

American football player (born 1964)

No. 85
- Position: Wide receiver

Personal information
- Born: July 13, 1964 (age 62); Los Angeles, California, U.S.
- Listed height: 5 ft 10 in (1.78 m)
- Listed weight: 180 lb (82 kg)

Career information
- High school: Manual Arts (Los Angeles)
- College: Weber State
- NFL draft: 1987: undrafted

Career history
- Houston Oilers (1987)

Career NFL statistics
- Receptions: 1
- Receiving yards: 38
- Stats at Pro Football Reference

Christopher Darrington (born July 13, 1964) is an American former professional football player who was a wide receiver for the Houston Oilers of the National Football League (NFL). He played college football for the Weber State Wildcats.
