= Alfred Pupunu =

Tongan gridiron football player (born 1969)

BYU Cougars
- Title: Offensive Analyst

Personal information
- Born: October 16, 1969 (age 57); Tonga
- Listed height: 6 ft 2 in (1.88 m)
- Listed weight: 260 lb (118 kg)

Career information
- Position: Tight end (No. 86, 85, 89, 81)
- High school: South (Salt Lake City, Utah, U.S.)
- College: Dixie State (1988–1990); Weber State (1990–1991)
- NFL draft: 1992: undrafted

Career history

Playing
- Kansas City Chiefs (1992)*; San Diego Chargers (1992–1997); Kansas City Chiefs (1997); New York Giants (1997–1998); San Diego Chargers (1999); Detroit Lions (2000)
- * Offseason or practice squad member only

Coaching
- Utah (2005–2007) Volunteer assistant; Southern Utah (2008–2009) Running backs/tight ends coach; Idaho (2010–2016) Tight ends coach; Weber State (2017–2018) Tight ends coach; Colorado (2019) Tight ends coach; BYU (2021–present) Offensive analyst (tight ends)

Career NFL statistics
- Receptions: 102
- Receiving yards: 1,000
- Receiving touchdowns: 3
- Stats at Pro Football Reference

Alfred Sione Pupunu (born October 16, 1969) is a former professional American football tight end who played nine seasons in the National Football League from 1992 to 2000. He played college football for the Weber State Wildcats.

== Early life ==
Pupunu attended and played high school football at South High School in Salt Lake City, Utah.

== College career ==
Pupunu played college football at Weber State University, where he went on to earn all-Big Sky Conference and All-American honors and has been inducted into the school's athletic Hall of Fame. Pupunu earned Walter Camp All-American honors after leading the nation (NCAA Division I-AA, now Football Championship Subdivision) in receptions, with 93, in 1991. The 93 receptions are the second-most ever in a single season by a tight end.

Pupunu was also an All-Conference performer at Dixie State College of Utah.

== Professional career ==
=== Playing career ===
Pupunu played for the San Diego Chargers (1992–1997, 1999), the Kansas City Chiefs (1997), the New York Giants (1998) and the Detroit Lions (2000). Pupunu made a championship appearance with the Chargers in Super Bowl XXIX in the 1994 season, and helped them get there by scoring a touchdown in the AFC title game.

Though Pupunu only scored five career touchdowns (three regular season, two postseason), he performed a unique celebration after each, in which he mimicked twisting off the top of a coconut and drinking the juice, a very popular celebration among San Diego fans. He nicknamed the gesture the "Kava Dance".

Pupunu finished his career with 102 receptions for 1,000 yards and three touchdowns in 103 games.

=== Coaching career ===
After retiring from the NFL in 2002, Pupunu worked as a graduate assistant at the University of Utah Utes Football Team for three years (2005–2007).

In 2008, Pupunu was invited by Head Coach Ed Lamb to coach the running backs and tight ends for the Southern Utah University (Cedar City, UT) Thunderbirds football team. On February 24, 2010, Pupunu was named assistant coach at the University of Idaho. Pupunu then starting coaching the tight ends at Weber State University beginning in the 2017 season.

In January 2019, he joined the University of Colorado staff as the tight end coach, hired by new CU head coach Mel Tucker. He has been an offensive analyst (tight ends) at BYU since 2021.

== Personal life ==
Pupunu was born in Vavau, Tonga, but moved to Utah with his parents as a child.
