= Jamie Martin (American football) =

American football player (born 1970)

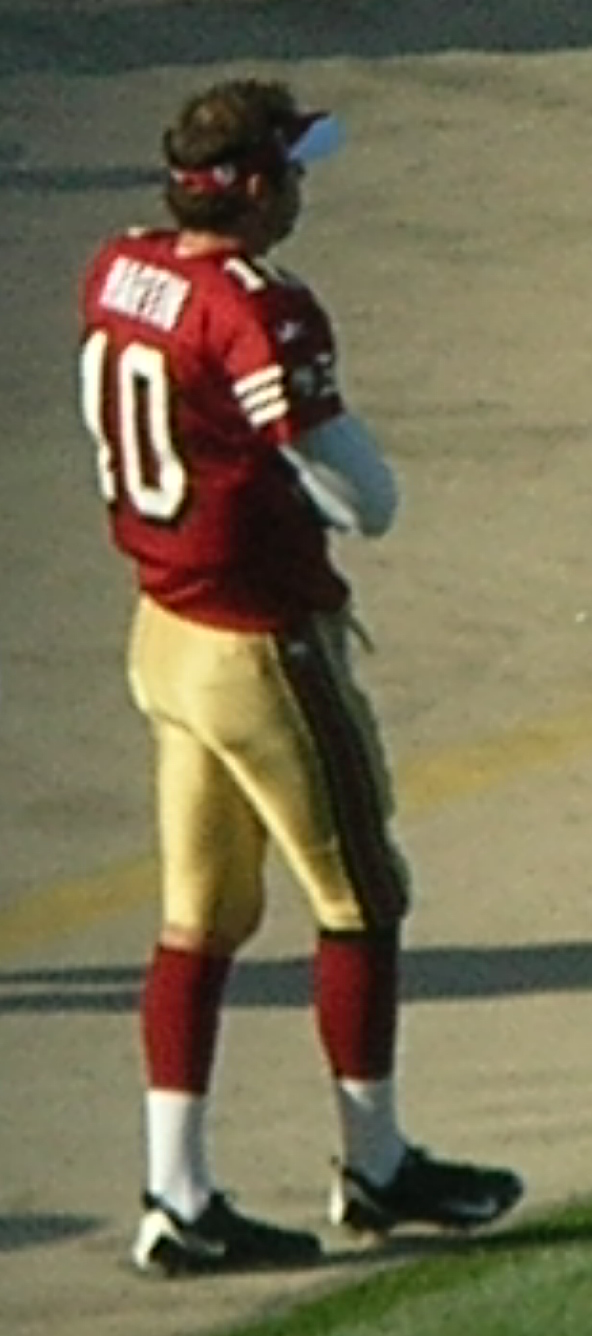
- Martin with the San Francisco 49ers in 2008

Missouri Baptist Spartans
- Title: Passing game coordinator & quarterbacks coach

Personal information
- Born: February 8, 1970 (age 56); Orange, California, U.S.
- Listed height: 6 ft 2 in (1.88 m)
- Listed weight: 205 lb (93 kg)

Career information
- Position: Quarterback (No. 10, 12, 11)
- High school: Arroyo Grande (Arroyo Grande, California)
- College: Weber State (1989–1992)
- NFL draft: 1993: undrafted

Career history

Playing
- Los Angeles / St. Louis Rams (1993–1996) →Amsterdam Admirals (1995); Washington Redskins (1997); Jacksonville Jaguars (1998); Cleveland Browns (1999); Jacksonville Jaguars (2000); St. Louis Rams (2001–2002); New York Jets (2003); St. Louis Rams (2004–2005); New Orleans Saints (2006–2007); San Francisco 49ers (2008)

Coaching
- Parkway West HS (MO) (2009–2019) Offensive coordinator & quarterbacks coach; Ogden Jets (2023–2024) Head coach; Weber State (2025) Offensive analyst; Missouri Baptist (2026–present) Passing game coordinator & quarterbacks coach

Awards and highlights
- Walter Payton Award (1991); Weber State Wildcats No. 10 retired

Career NFL statistics
- Passing attempts: 541
- Passing completions: 355
- Completion percentage: 65.6%
- TD–INT: 20–21
- Passing yards: 3,814
- Passer rating: 82.3
- Stats at Pro Football Reference

Jamie Blane Martin (born February 8, 1970) is an American football coach and former professional quarterback who played in the National Football League (NFL). He is the passing game coordinator and quarterbacks coach for Missouri Baptist University, positions he has held since 2026. He played college football for the Weber State Wildcats and was signed by the Los Angeles Rams as an undrafted free agent after the 1993 NFL draft.

Martin was also a member of the Washington Redskins, Jacksonville Jaguars, Cleveland Browns, New York Jets, New Orleans Saints, and San Francisco 49ers of the NFL, and the Amsterdam Admirals of NFL Europe.

== Early life ==
Martin attended Arroyo Grande High School in Arroyo Grande, California.

He led his team to the California Interscholastic Federation championship in 1987, when he completed 170 of 276 passes (61.6 percent) for 2,259 yards and 16 touchdowns. Overall during his prep career for AGHS, Martin accumulated 4,955 passing yards and 40 touchdowns, each Northern League records at the time.

== College career ==
Martin starred at Weber State University from 1989 to 1992. As a freshman, he played in eight games, but showed few glimpses of his future greatness. Martin struggled as he adjusted to football at the college level; he completed just 86 of 233 passes for 1,175 yards and nine touchdowns.

The next year (1990) was Martin's breakout season. He completed 256 of 428 passes for 3,700 yards and 23 touchdowns. He led the NCAA Division I-AA in passing (336.4 yards per game) and total offense (337.6 yards per game). He was named first-team All-Big Sky Conference.

Martin followed his strong sophomore campaign with a spectacular junior year (1991). He completed 310 of 500 passes for 4,125 yards and 35 touchdowns. He again led Division I-AA in passing (375.0 yards per game) and total offense (394.3 yards per game). With Martin at the helm, Weber State's offense averaged 578.5 yards per game, setting a national record. Martin set Division I-AA records for pass completions (47), passing yards (624), and total offense yards (643) in a game against Idaho State. He also had a spectacular performance against Eastern Washington, throwing seven touchdown passes in that game. For his efforts, Martin was named a First Team All-American and was awarded the Walter Payton Award, given annually to the top FCS player in the nation.

His senior season (1992) was solid, but his statistics declined from the previous year. He finished with 282 completions in 383 attempts, totaling 3,207 yards and 20 touchdown passes. He led the Big Sky in passing (291.5 yards per game) and earned third-team All-American honors.

Martin finished his career as the all-time leader in passing (12,207 yards) and total offense (12,287 yards) in the history of Division I-AA football. His 87 career touchdown passes were a Big Sky record.

He played in the 1993 East–West Shrine Game and the Hula Bowl.

== Professional career ==
=== Los Angeles / St. Louis Rams (first stint) ===
Despite his tremendous collegiate career, Martin was not drafted into the NFL. He signed a free agent contract with the Los Angeles Rams in 1993. He spent four seasons with the Rams franchise (two in Los Angeles, two after the team moved to St. Louis). He played in nine games with the Amsterdam Admirals of the NFL Europe in 1995. He saw his first action in the NFL in 1996, playing in six games with the Rams.

=== Washington ===
Martin spent 1997 as third-string quarterback for Washington Redskins of the NFL.

=== Jacksonville Jaguars (first stint) ===
After one season in Washington, Martin joined the Jacksonville Jaguars for the 1998 season. He played in four games with the Jaguars; his first pass attempt against Detroit went for a 67-yard touchdown. His first career start came December 13 against Tennessee, but an ACL injury in that game ended his season. He finished 1998 with 27 completions for 355 yards and two touchdowns; his final passer rating was 99.8 points.

=== Cleveland Browns ===
Martin joined the Cleveland Browns for the 1999 season, but spent most of the year on the inactive list.

=== Jacksonville Jaguars (second stint) ===
Martin re-joined the Jaguars in 2000, and saw limited action in five games.

=== St. Louis Rams (second stint) ===
Martin had his second stint with the Rams from 2001 to 2002. He saw significant playing time in 2002 filling in for injured quarterback Marc Bulger. He played in 5 games, starting two of them, throwing for 1,216 yards with 7 touchdowns and 10 interceptions.

=== New York Jets ===
Martin spent 2003 with the New York Jets, but did not appear in a game for them.

=== St. Louis Rams (third stint) ===
Martin joined the Rams for the third time in 2004 and spent two seasons with the team.

=== New Orleans Saints ===
Martin joined the Saints in 2006 and served as a backup to Drew Brees for two seasons.

=== San Francisco 49ers ===
On September 10, 2008, Martin was signed by the San Francisco 49ers after quarterback Alex Smith was placed on injured reserve. The move reunited Martin with 49ers offensive coordinator and former Rams head coach Mike Martz.

== Post-football career ==
On April 4, 2012, Martin, a drum player, founded Explode the Moon, an electric rock band that does cover songs. He is also the offensive coordinator for Parkway West High School in Ballwin, Missouri. His wife coaches the Parkway West varsity cheerleaders.

Martin recently took ownership of Circa Pub & Grill, a restaurant in Des Peres that serves traditional St. Louis dishes.

On November 15, 2014, at halftime of Weber State's victory over the University of Northern Colorado, his #10 jersey was retired by Weber State University.

In 2023, Martin became the head coach of the Ogden Jets, a team that is part of the private Junior College football league USA Collegiate.

After spending 2025 as a member of the Weber State football staff, Martin joined the Missouri Baptist Spartans football team as the Pass Game Coordinator, and Quarterbacks Coach.
