= Jim Schmedding =

American football player (1946–2025)

No. 56, 64
- Position: Guard

Personal information
- Born: February 10, 1946; San Diego, California, U.S.
- Died: February 15, 2025 (aged 79); Logan, Utah, U.S.
- Listed height: 6 ft 2 in (1.88 m)
- Listed weight: 250 lb (113 kg)

Career information
- High school: Granada Hills (Los Angeles, California)
- College: Weber State (1965-1967)
- NFL draft: 1968: 6th round, 154th overall pick

Career history
- Las Vegas Cowboys (1968); San Diego Chargers (1968-1970)

Career NFL/AFL statistics
- Games played: 24
- Games started: 10
- Stats at Pro Football Reference

Jim Schmedding (February 10, 1946 – February 15, 2025) was an American professional football player who was a guard for the San Diego Chargers of the American Football League (AFL) and National Football League (NFL) from 1968 to 1970. He played college football for the Weber State Wildcats. He died in Logan, Utah, on February 15, 2025, at the age of 79.
