= Nishinomiya Bruins =

American football team

General information
- Founded: 1988
- Headquartered: Nishinomiya, Hyogo, Japan
- Colors: Blue and White
- Website: http://nishinomiyafootballclub.com/

Personnel
- General manager: Norihiko Takai
- Head coach: Fukui

League / conference affiliations
- X-League X2; West

The Nishinomiya Bruins are an American football team located in Nishinomiya, Hyogo, Japan. They are a member of the X-League X2 division.

== Team history ==
- 1988 Started as a club of 12 volunteers from the Hankyu Department Store.
- 1989 Team formerly established with sponsorship from the Hankyu Department Store.
- 1990 Joined the X-League X2 division.
- 2002 Promoted from X2 to X1. Finished 5th in the West division (1 win, 4 losses).
- 2004 Finished 6th in the West division (0 wins, 5 losses). Lost X1-X2 replacement match. Demoted to X2 for the following season.
- 2011 Finished 1st in the X2 West division (5 wins, 2 losses). Won X2-X1 promotion game against the Fuji Xerox J-Stars 25-5. Promoted to X1 for the following season.
- 2012 Hankyu Department Store ends team sponsorship. Team renamed the Nishinomiya Bruins. Finished 6th in the X1 West division (2 wins, 7 losses). Won X1-X2 replacement match against the Fuji Xerox J-Stars 23-20 OT.
- 2013 Finished 5th in the X2 West division (3 wins, 6 losses).
- 2014 Finished 6th in the X1 West division (3 wins, 6 losses). Won X1-X2 replacement game against the Fuji Xerox J-Stars 30-0.
- 2015 Finished 0-2 in the Green Bowl Spring Tournament. Demoted to X2 for the Fall tournament. Finished 4th in the X2 West division (2 wins, 3 losses).

== Seasons ==
| X-League champions (1987–present) | Division champions | Final Stage/Semifinals Berth | Wild Card /2nd Stage Berth |

| Season | League | Division | Regular Season | | | | Postseason results | Awards | Head coaches |
| Season | League | Division | Finish | Wins | Losses | Ties | Postseason results | Awards | Head coaches |
|---|---|---|---|---|---|---|---|---|---|
| 2009 | X2 | West | 4th | 3 | 4 | 0 | | | Fukui |
| 2010 | X2 | West | 3rd | 4 | 3 | 0 | | | Fukui |
| 2011 | X2 | West | 1st | 5 | 2 | 0 | Won X2-X1 promotion match (at Fuji Xerox) 25-5 | | Fukui |
| 2012 | X1 | West | 6th | 2 | 5 | 0 | Lost 2nd stage relegation match (at Elecom Kobe)7-21; Lost 2nd stage relegation match (at Nagoya) 7-20; Won X1-X2 replacement match (Fuji Xerox) 23-20 OT | | Fukui |
| 2013 | X1 | West | 5th | 2 | 5 | 0 | Won 2nd stage relegation match (Nagoya) 10-7; Lost 2nd stage relegation match (at Elecom Kobe) 7-42 | | Fukui |
| 2014 | X1 | West | 6th | 2 | 5 | 0 | Lost 2nd stage relegation match (at As One Black Eagles) 14-37; Won 2nd stage relegation match (at Nagoya) 13-10; Won X1-X2 replacement match (Fuji Xerox J-Stars) 30-0 | | Fukui |
| 2015 | X2 | West | 4th | 2 | 5 | 0 | | | Fukui |
| Total | | | | | | | (2009–2015, includes only regular season) | | |
| Total | | | | | | | (2009–2015, includes only playoffs) | | |
| Total | | | | | | | (2009–2015, includes both regular season and playoffs) | | |
