= Carter Campbell =

American football player (born 1947)

No. 51, 79
- Positions: Defensive end, linebacker

Personal information
- Born: September 29, 1947 (age 79); Mobile, Alabama, U.S.
- Listed height: 6 ft 4 in (1.93 m)
- Listed weight: 240 lb (109 kg)

Career information
- High school: Vanden (Fairfield, California)
- College: Weber State
- NFL draft: 1970: 8th round, 191st overall pick

Career history
- San Francisco 49ers (1970); Denver Broncos (1971); New York Giants (1972–1973)

Awards and highlights
- Second-team Little All-American (1969)

Career NFL statistics
- Sacks: 11.5
- Fumble recoveries: 1
- Stats at Pro Football Reference

Carter Campbell (born September 29, 1947) is an American former professional football player who was a defensive end and linebacker in the National Football League (NFL). He played college football for the Weber State Wildcats. Campbell played in the NFL for the San Francisco 49ers in 1970, Denver Broncos in 1971 and New York Giants from 1972 to 1973.

Campbell was outspoken during the 1974 NFL strike and believed he was cut by the Giants before the 1974 season as punishment. Campbell stated that "Everyone who spoke out will be punished just like they are punishing me."
