= Halvor Hagen =

American football player (born 1947)

No. 64, 62, 88, 76
- Positions: Offensive lineman, Defensive end

Personal information
- Born: February 4, 1947 (age 79); Oslo, Norway
- Listed height: 6 ft 5 in (1.96 m)
- Listed weight: 245 lb (111 kg)

Career information
- High school: Ballard (Seattle, Washington, U.S.)
- College: Weber State
- NFL draft: 1969: 3rd round, 74th overall pick

Career history
- Dallas Cowboys (1969–1970); New England Patriots (1971–1972); Buffalo Bills (1973–1975); San Diego Chargers (1976)*; New Orleans Saints (1976)*; San Francisco 49ers (1976)*
- * Offseason or practice squad member only

Awards and highlights
- All-Big Sky (1968)

Career NFL statistics
- Games played: 70
- Games started: 24
- Fumble recoveries: 2
- Stats at Pro Football Reference

Halvor Reini Hagen (born February 4, 1947) is a former American football offensive tackle in the National Football League (NFL) for the Dallas Cowboys, New England Patriots, and Buffalo Bills. He was drafted in the third round of the 1969 NFL/AFL draft by the Dallas Cowboys. He played college football at Weber State University.

== Early life ==
Hagen was born in Oslo, Norway. He played football for only one season at Ballard High School (Seattle, Washington). He then enrolled and played one season of college football at Shoreline Community College, before transferring to Weber State.

As a senior in 1968, he received All-Big Sky honors for his play at defensive tackle. During his time in college, he was also an avid skier.

In 2006, he was inducted into the Weber State Athletics Hall of Fame.

== Professional career ==
=== Dallas Cowboys ===
Hagen was selected by the Dallas Cowboys in the third round (74th overall) of the 1969 NFL/AFL draft. In his rookie season he was used as a defensive lineman, before being switched to offensive guard in 1970. He was a part of the Super Bowl V team.

During the 1971 offseason, because Duane Thomas was going through a contract dispute (he requested that his 3-year contract be rewritten) and refused to report to training camp, the Cowboys traded him to the New England Patriots alongside Hagen and Honor Jackson, in exchange for Carl Garrett and the Patriots number one draft choice in the 1972 NFL draft. Within a week, because of problems with the Patriots and head coach John Mazur, in an unprecedented move, the NFL commissioner voided part of the trade, sending Thomas and Garrett back to their original teams. The Patriots kept Hagen and Jackson in exchange for a second and third round draft choices in the 1972 NFL draft, which the Cowboys eventually used to select Robert Newhouse and Mike Keller.

=== New England Patriots ===
Hagen became a starter at left guard in 1971. On April 19, 1972, he was traded along with Jim Cheyunski and Mike Montler to the Buffalo Bills, in exchange for Wayne Patrick, Edgar Chandler and Jeff Lyman.

=== Buffalo Bills ===
In 1973, he started 5 games at left defensive end over Walt Patulski. He was not effective as expected and was later moved to the team's taxi squad.

In 1974, he played offensive tackle on the offensive line that was nicknamed "The Electric Company", when they were blocking for O. J. Simpson. He appeared in 8 games with 4 starts.

On April 9, 1976, he was traded to the San Diego Chargers in exchange for a ninth-round draft choice (#241-Jeff Turner).

=== San Diego Chargers ===
In 1976, he was moved to offensive guard, during training camp. On August 10, he was traded to the New Orleans Saints in exchange for an undisclosed draft choice (not exercised).

=== New Orleans Saints ===
He was released on August 26, 1976.

=== San Francisco 49ers ===
On September 2, 1976, he was signed as a free agent by the San Francisco 49ers. He was released on September 6.

== Personal life ==
His father Gunnar Halvor was a notable skier.
