= International Business Broker's Association =

- Abbreviation: IBBA
- Formation: 1984; 42 years ago
- Founder: Tom West
- Type: Nonprofit professional association
- Location: Independence, Ohio, United States
- Region served: North America
- Members: 1,000 (2017)
- Website: www.ibba.org

The International Business Brokers Association (IBBA) is a North American professional association operating for people and firms engaged in business brokerage and mergers and acquisitions in the US and Canada.

The association provides business brokers with education, conferences, professional designations, and networking opportunities. The IBBA was formed in 1984, and most members are based in the US and Canada, though there are a few from elsewhere in the world. The IBBA strives to create a professional relationship with successful business transaction advisors (i.e., CPAs, bankers, attorneys, and other related associations), to increase the image and value of the IBBA to its members, and to be a leader in the exchange of business referrals.

As of 2025, the minimum annual fee for an individual to be a member of the IBBA was $475. IBBA offers a directory of business brokers on their site. It portrays itself as an international directory, but it is focused almost exclusively on business brokers in North America. IBBA has an arrangement with a business listing site, BizBuySell, which allows the IBBA to publish all BizBuySell's listings under the IBBA banner.

== History ==
The International Business Brokers Association (IBBA) was founded in 1984 by Tom West and a group of business brokerage professionals to promote professionalism, ethics, and education within the industry. The association provides education, professional designations such as Certified Business Intermediary (CBI), and networking opportunities for business brokers and M&A advisors.

By the mid-2000s, the IBBA had grown significantly, holding regular conferences and expanding its membership internationally although members were primely based in the United States.

== Function ==
The IBBA provides educational courses for business brokers. It awards the Certified Business Intermediary (CBI) certification and runs the courses and seminars required to obtain this certification. Certified Business Intermediary (CBI) is the designation awarded to IBBA members who satisfy educational requirements and adhere to IBBA's standards.

== Affiliates and Chapters ==
=== Affiliates ===
Regional (US)

- Arizona Business Brokers Association
- Business Brokers of Florida
- California Association of Business Brokers
- Colorado Association of Business Intermediaries
- Carolina - Virginia Business Brokers Association
- Georgia Association of Business Brokers
- Mid-Atlantic Business Brokers Association
- Michigan Business Brokers Association
- Midwest Business Brokers Intermediaries
- New England Business Brokers Association
- New York Association of Business Brokers
- Ohio Business Brokers Association
- Pennsylvania Business Brokers Association
- Texas Association of Business Brokers

Regional (Non US)

- UK: Institute of Transaction Advisers and Business Brokers
- Australia: Australian Institute of Business Brokers

=== Chapters ===
- IBBA Canada
