= Weber State Wildcats football =

Intercollegiate American football team

2026 Weber State Wildcats football team
- First season: 1962; 64 years ago
- Head coach: Eric Kjar; 1st season, 0–0 (–)
- Location: Ogden, Utah
- Stadium: Stewart Stadium (capacity: 17,312)
- NCAA division: Division I FCS
- Conference: Big Sky
- Colors: Purple and white
- All-time record: 347–355–3 (.494)

Conference championships
- Big Sky: 1965, 1968, 1987, 2008, 2017, 2018, 2019, 2020
- Rivalries: Idaho State; Northern Arizona (rivalry); Southern Utah (rivalry)
- Mascot: Waldo the Wildcat
- Website: WeberStateSports.com

The Weber State Wildcats football program is the intercollegiate American football team for Weber State University, located in Ogden, Utah. The team competes in the NCAA Division I Football Championship Subdivision (FCS) and is a charter member of the Big Sky Conference, founded in 1963. The school's first football team was fielded a year earlier in 1962. Home games are played at the 17,312-seat Stewart Stadium. The Wildcats are led by head coach Eric Kjar.

== History ==
=== Classifications ===
- 1962–1972: NCAA College Division
- 1973–1977: NCAA Division II
- 1978–present: NCAA Division I–AA / FCS

=== Conference memberships ===
- 1962: Independent
- 1963–present: Big Sky Conference

== Postseason results ==
Weber State's first postseason appearance was in 1987.

=== Division I-AA/FCS Playoffs ===
The Wildcats have appeared in the I-AA/FCS playoffs ten times, with an overall record of 8–10.

Year	Round	Opponent	Result	Head coach
1987	First Round; Quarterfinals	@ Idaho @ Marshall	W 59–30; L 23–51	Mike Price
1991	First Round	@ Northern Iowa	L 21–38	Dave Arslanian
2008	First Round; Quarterfinals	@ Cal Poly @ Montana	W 49–35; L 13–24	Ron McBride
2009	First Round	@ William & Mary	L 25–38	Ron McBride
2016	First Round	@ Chattanooga	L 14–45	Jay Hill
2017	First Round; Second Round; Quarterfinals	Western Illinois @ Southern Utah @ James Madison	W 21–19; W 30–13; L 28–31	Jay Hill
2018	Second Round; Quarterfinals	SE Missouri State; Maine	W 48–23; L 18–23	Jay Hill
2019	Second Round; Quarterfinals; Semifinals	Kennesaw State; Montana @ James Madison	W 26–20; W 17–10; L 14–30	Jay Hill
2020	First Round	Southern Illinois	L 31–34	Jay Hill
2022	First Round; Second Round	North Dakota @ Montana State	W 38–31; L 25-33	Jay Hill

== Retired numbers ==
Weber State Wildcats retired numbers
No.	Player	Pos.	Tenure	No. ret.	Ref.
10	Jamie Martin	QB	1989–1992	2014	

Jamie Martin led the NCAA Division I-AA in passing (336.4 yards per game) and total offense (337.6 yards per game) in 1990. He was named to the First-team All-Big Sky Conference.

Martin followed his strong sophomore campaign with a spectacular junior year in 1991. He completed 310 of 500 passes for 4,125 yards and 35 touchdowns. He again led the Division I-AA in passing (375.0 yards per game) and total offense (394.3 yards per game). Martin set Division I-AA records for pass completions (47), passing yards (624), and total offense yards (643) in a game against Idaho State. Martin was named First-team All-American and was awarded the Walter Payton Award, given annually to the top Division I-AA player in the nation.

In his senior season in 1992, he led the Big Sky in passing (291.5 yards per game) and earned Third-team All-American honors. Martin finished his career as the all-time leader in passing (12,207 yards) and total offense (12,287 yards) in the history of Division I-AA football. His 87 career touchdown passes were a Big Sky record. He played in the 1993 East–West Shrine Game and the Hula Bowl.

== Rivalries ==
=== Idaho State ===
Idaho State University, residing in Pocatello, Idaho, is the closest conference member to Weber State, the driving distance between the two campuses being about 130 miles. The teams first competed in October 1962, and have played each other annually since becoming charter members of the Big Sky Conference in July 1963. Weber State leads the series 49-17 (.743).

In the 2024 season, the Train Bell Trophy, a rivalry trophy between the two schools, was reintroduced, having not been used since the 1970s. Idaho State defeated Weber State in Ogden to gain possession of the trophy, the first time the Wildcats have lost against the Bengals at home since 1984.

=== Northern Arizona ===
Weber State first played Northern Arizona in the 1964 season, and have played them annually since then, with the exception of the 2017 season. The series is tied 29-29 (.500) through the 2025 fall season.

=== Southern Utah ===
Between 1984 and 2011, Weber State played Southern Utah 17 times, winning all but three times. In the 2011 season, Southern Utah officially joined the Big Sky Conference, making the rivalry game annual. In 2021, Southern Utah vacated the Big Sky Conference for the Western Athletic Conference, who had recently reinstated football as a sport, and the two schools have not played against each other since then. However, Southern Utah, along with Utah Tech, will be joining the Big Sky Conference in the 2026 season, renewing the rivalry. Weber State leads the series 21-8 (.724).

== National award winners ==
- Walter Payton Award

Walter Payton Award
Year	Name	Position
1991	Jamie Martin	Quarterback

The Walter Payton Award is awarded annually to the most outstanding offensive player in the NCAA Division I Football Championship Subdivision (formerly Division I-AA) of college football.

- Jerry Rice Award

Jerry Rice Award
Year	Name	Position
2018	Josh Davis	Runningback

The Jerry Rice Award is awarded annually in the United States to the most outstanding freshman player in the NCAA Division I Football Championship Subdivision (FCS) of college football.

== All-Americans ==
- Sid Otton, OT- 1965 (2nd Team)
- Ron McCall, LB - 1966 (1st Team)
- Lee Schmeeding, OG - 1967 (1st Team)
- Lee White, FB - 1967 (1st Team)
- Carter Campbell, DT - 1969 (1st Team)
- Henry Reed, DT - 1970 (1st Team)
- Dave Taylor, OT - 1971 (1st Team)
- Rod Bockwoldt, QB - 1976 (2nd Team)
- Dennis Duncanson, DB - 1977 (1st Team)
- Dennis Duncanson, DB - 1978 (1st Team)
- Randy Jordan, WR - 1978 (1st Team)
- Mike Humiston, LB - 1980 (1st Team)
- Danny Rich, LB - 1981 (1st Team)
- Peter Macon, TE - 1989 (1st Team)
- Mike Babb, DB - 1989 (2nd Team)
- Brent Chuhaniuk, P - 1989 (2nd Team)
- Jamie Martin, QB - 1990 (1st Team)
- Trevor Shaw, TE - 1990 (2nd Team)
- Jamie Martin, QB - 1991 (1st Team)
- Bruce Covernton, OT - 1991 (1st Team)
- Alfred Pupunu TE - 1991 (1st Team)
- Geoff Mitchell RB - 1991 (Honorable Mention)
- Jamie Martin, QB - 1992 (3rd Team)
- Rob Hitchcock DB - 1993 (1st Team)
- Pat McNerney TE - 1993 (2nd Team)
- Rob Hitchcock DB - 1994 (2nd Team)
- Pokey Eckford WR - 1995 (1st Team)
- Scott Shields PK - 1995 (2nd Team)
- Cam Quayle TE - 1996 (1st Team)
- Scott Shields PK - 1996 (1st Team)
- Cam Quayle TE - 1997 (1st Team)
- Scott Shields P/PK/DB - 1997 (1st Team)
- Scott Shields P/PK/DB - 1998 (1st Team)
- Ryan Prince TE - 2000 (1st Team)
- Brady Fosmark DE - 2003 (2nd Team)
- Nick Chournos RB - 2003 (3rd Team)
- Matt McFadden LB - 2003 (3rd Team)
- Brady Fosmark DE - 2004 (1st Team)
- Joe Johnson K PK - 2004 (1st Team)
- Paul McQuistan OT - 2005 (1st Team)
- Brady Fosmark DE - 2005 (2nd Team)
- David Hale OT - 2006 (2nd Team)
- David Hale OT - 2007 (2nd Team)
- Bryant Eteuati KR - 2007 (Honorable Mention)
- Trevyn Smith RB - 2007 (Honorable Mention)
- Trevyn Smith RB - 2007 (2nd Team)
- Tim Toone WR - 2008 (2nd Team)
- Paul Carpenter OT - 2008 (3rd Team)
- Beau Hadley S - 2008 (3rd Team)
- Cameron Higgins QB- 2008 (3rd Team)
- Cody Nakamura TE - 2008 (3rd Team)
- Bryce Scanlon DT - 2008 (3rd Team)
- Kevin Linehan DE - 2008 (Honorable Mention)
- Marcus Mailei FB - 2008 (Honorable Mention)
- Josh Morris CB - 2008 (Honorable Mention)
- Josh Morris CB - 2009 (1st Team)
- Kyle Mutcher C - 2009 (1st Team)
- Tim Toone WR - 2009 (1st Team)
- Bo Bolen FB - 2009 (2nd Team)
- J.C. Oram OG - 2010 (2nd Team)
- Vai Tafuna FB - 2010 (2nd Team)
- Joe Collins WR - 2010 (3rd Team)
- J.C. Oram OG - 2011 (1st Team)
- Joe Hawkins C - 2015 (1st Team)
- Andrew Vollert TE - 2016 (3rd Team)
- Xequille Harry KR - 2017 (1st Team)
- Taron Johnson CB - 2017 (1st Team)
- Brady May FB - 2017 (1st Team)
- Rashid Shaheed KR - 2017 (1st Team)
- Trey Tuttle PK - 2017 (1st Team)
- LeGrand Toia LB - 2017 (2nd Team)
- Andrew Vollert TE - 2017 (2nd Team)
- Sua Opeta OG - 2017 (3rd Team)
- Brady May FB - 2018 (1st Team)
- Sua Opeta OG - 2018 (1st Team)
- LeGrand Toia LB - 2018 (1st Team)
- Rashid Shaheed KR - 2018 (2nd Team)
- Josh Davis RB - 2018 (3rd Team)
- Adam Rodriguez DE - 2018 (3rd Team)
- Filipe Sitake DT - 2018 (3rd Team)
- Jonah Williams DT -(1st Team)
- Trey Tuttle PK - 2019 (2nd Team)
- Josh Davis RB - 2019 (3rd Team)
- Adam Rodriguez DE - 2019 (3rd Team)
- Conner Mortensen LB - 2020-21 (1st Team)
- Ty Whitworth OG - 2020-21 (1st Team)
- Rashid Shaheed KR - 2020-21 (2nd Team)
- Preston Smith S - 2020-21 (2nd Team)
- Rashid Shaheed KR - 2021 (1st Team)
- Maxwell Anderson CB - 2022 (1st Team)
- Eddie Heckard CB - 2022 (1st Team)
- Abraham Williams KR - 2022 (1st Team)
- Noah Atagi OT - 2022 (3rd Team)
- Winston Reid LB - 2022 (3rd Team)
- Noah Atagi OT - 2023 (1st Team)
- Winston Reid LB - 2023 (1st Team)
- Maxwell Anderson CB - 2023 (2nd Team)
- Jack Burgess P - 2023 (2nd Team)
- Abraham Williams KR - 2023 (3rd Team)
- Kemari Munier-Bailey DE - 2024 (3rd Team)
- Kyle Thompson PK - 2024 (Honorable Mention)

== Notable former players ==
- Robb Akey
- Bob Bees
- Jeff Carlson
- Carter Campbell
- Bruce Covernton
- Chris Darrington
- Wade Davis
- John Fassel
- J.D. Folsom
- Halvor Hagen
- David Hale
- Josh Heupel
- Cameron Higgins
- Taron Johnson
- Al Lolotai
- Jamie Martin
- Anthony Parker
- Ryan Prince
- Bob Pollard
- Darryl Pollard
- Alfred Pupunu
- Marcus Mailei
- Pat McQuistan
- Paul McQuistan
- Sua Opeta
- Brad Otton
- Cam Quayle
- Henry Reed
- Roger Ruzek
- Jim Schmedding
- Rashid Shaheed
- Scott Shields
- Tim Toone
- Andrew Vollert
- Jonah Williams

== Future non-conference opponents ==
Announced schedules as of November 5, 2026.

2027	2028	2029	2030
at BYU	Lamar	Northern Iowa	at BYU
South Dakota State	at South Dakota State	at Utah	
at Northern Iowa			
