= Business broker =

Intermediary between businesses

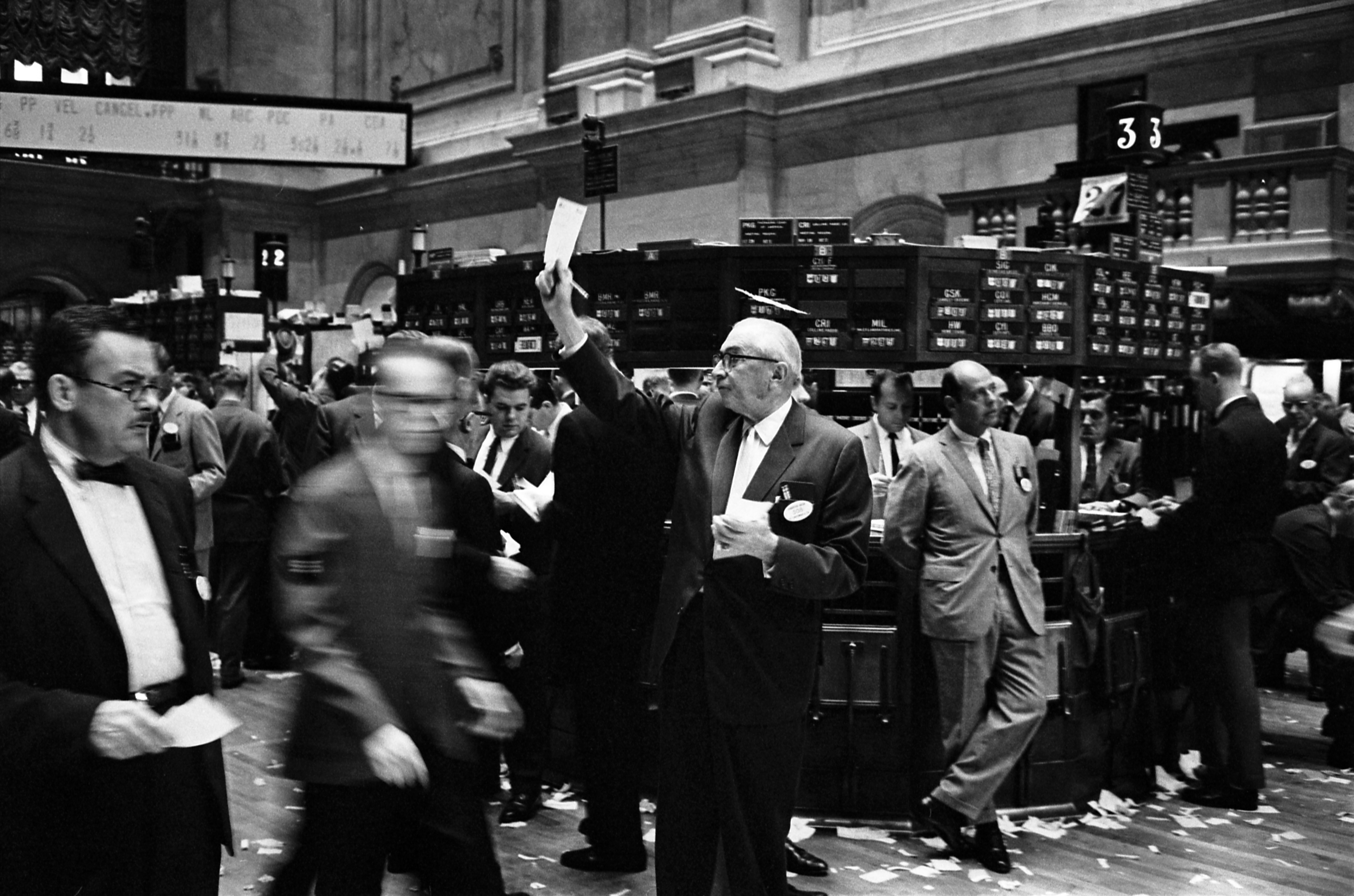

Business brokers, also called business transfer agents, or intermediaries, assist buyers and sellers of privately held businesses in the buying and selling process. They typically estimate the value of the business; advertise it for sale with or without disclosing its identity; handle the initial potential buyer interviews, discussions, and negotiations with prospective buyers; facilitate the progress of the due diligence investigation and generally assist with the business sale.

The use of a business broker is not a requirement for the sale or conveyance of a business in most parts of the world.

In the US, using a broker is also not a requirement for obtaining a small business or SBA loan from a lender. However, once a broker is used, a special escrow attorney sometimes called a settlement attorney (very similar to a Real Estate Closing in practice) ensures that all parties involved get paid. In the UK, that service is provided by a commercial solicitor specializing in transaction activity.

Business brokers generally serve the lower market, also known as the Main Street market, where most transactions are outright purchases of businesses. Investment banks, transaction advisors, corporate finance firms and others serve the middle market space for larger privately held companies as these transactions often involve mergers and acquisitions (M&A), recapitalizations, management buyouts and public offerings which require a different set of skills and, often, licensing from a regulatory body. Business brokers and M&A firms do overlap activities in the lower end of the M&A market.

== Agency relationships with clients and customers ==
Traditionally, the broker provides a conventional full-service, commission-based brokerage relationship under a signed agreement with a seller or a “buyer representation” agreement with a buyer. In most US states, this creates, under common law, an agency relationship with fiduciary obligations. Some states also have statutes that define and control the nature of the representation and have specific business broker licensing requirements.

=== Transactions brokers ===
In some U.S. states, business brokers act as transaction brokers. A transaction broker represents neither party as an agent, but works to facilitate the transaction and deals with both parties on the same level of trust. In the UK, it is generally only business brokers specialised in the sale of accountancy practices who operate as transaction brokers. A transaction broker typically gets paid by both the buyer and the seller.

=== Dual or limited agency ===
Dual agency occurs when the same brokerage represents both the seller and the buyer under written agreements. Individual state laws vary and interpret dual agency rather differently.

- If state law allows for the same agent to represent both the buyer and the seller in a single transaction, the brokerage/agent is typically considered to be a dual agent. Special laws and rules often apply to dual agents, especially in negotiating price.
- In some U.S. states (notably Maryland), Dual agency can be practiced in situations where the same brokerage (but not agent) represent both the buyer and the seller. If one agent from the brokerage has a business listed and another agent from that brokerage has a buyer-brokerage agreement with a buyer who wishes to buy the listed business, dual agency occurs by allowing each agent to be designated as "intra-company" agent. Only the principal broker himself/herself is the dual agent.

== General ==
The sellers and buyers themselves are the principals in the sale, and business brokers (and the principal broker's agents) are their agents as defined in the law. However, although a business broker commonly does work such as creation of an information memorandum for a seller or completing the offer to purchase form on behalf of a buyer, agents are typically not given power of attorney to sign closing documents; the principals sign these documents. The respective business brokers may include their brokerages on the contract as the agents for each principal.

== Typical Business Brokerage Fee ==
There are three forms of brokers compensation: hourly, retainer, and success fee (commission upon a closing). A broker may use any one, or combination of these when providing services. Some charge on reaching certain milestones such as creation of the Information Memorandum or signing of Heads of Terms.

In the U.S., standard business brokerage fees for the sale of a business or asset selling for under $10 million are usually 10% to a specific target price, and then 12% thereafter. This success fee is usually subject to a minimum fee payment of $50,000, and clients usually pay an initial research and preparation fee of 1% of revenue.

In the UK, many brokers handling the sale of smaller businesses often operate on a no retainer basis and with their entire compensation being paid only on successful sale of the business. Others charge a small retainer ranging from a few hundred pounds to a few thousand. Larger businesses may pay several tens of thousands in retainers followed by a success fee ranging from 5% to 10%. Commissions are negotiable between seller and broker.

== Licensing of business brokers ==
In the US, licensing of business brokers varies by state, with some states requiring licenses, some not; and some requiring licenses if the broker is commissioned but not requiring a license if the broker works on an hourly fee basis. State rules also vary about recognizing licensees across state lines, especially for interstate types of businesses like national franchises. Some states, like California, require either a broker license or law license to even advise a business owner on issues of sale, terms of sale, or introduction of a buyer to a seller for a fee. All Canadian provinces with the exception of Alberta, require a real estate license in order to commence a career. According to an IBBA convention seminar in 2000, at least 13 states required business brokers to have a real estate license. The following states require a license to practice as a business broker: Arizona, California, Colorado, Florida, Georgia, Idaho, Illinois (registration only), Minnesota, Nebraska, Nevada, Oregon (only if real estate transfer is part of the transaction), Rhode Island, South Dakota, Utah, Wisconsin, and Wyoming.

The licensing of business brokers varies from country to country. In the UK there is no licensing system in place and no formal requirements for practising as a business broker. In Australia, business brokers are required to be licensed in the same way as real estate agents, and licensing is managed by the relevant state licensing bodies which oversee real estate licenses.

Certain types of M&A transactions involve securities and may require that these "middlemen" be securities licensed in order to be compensated, though there was a major change to the law in late 2022 to exempt smaller transactions. The governing authority in the US is the U.S. Securities and Exchange Commission and they describe a broker as any person engaged in the business of effecting transactions in securities for the account of others. The equivalent regulatory authority in the UK is the Financial Conduct Authority and in the EU it is the European Securities and Markets Authority.

== Business Broker Associations ==
Business brokers have a number of National, Regional and local Associations in the United States that provide education, regulatory and annual conferences for its members. One of the largest is the IBBA which has over 500 business broker members across the United States. The IBBA also has a Canadian arm.

In the UK the national body is the Institute for Transaction Advisers and Business Brokers. In Australia the national body is the Australian Institute of Business Brokers.

=== Business Broker Associations ===
Business brokers have a number of national, regional, and local associations...

Major Business Broker Associations by Region and Scope

Association	Region	Key Features	Source
IBBA	U.S./Canada	Certifications (CBI), education, BizBuySell partnership	
IUCAB	Global (70+ years)	Represents 21 national associations, 600K+ agents	
Australian Institute	Australia	National licensing standards	
Industry Publication	United States		
FITA	Global (450+ groups)	Trade leads, customs/tariffs resources for 80+ countries	
