= Pearl Bowl =

- パールボウル
- Stadium: Tokyo Dome
- Location: Tokyo, Japan
- Previous stadiums: Korakuen Stadium (1976–1987); Yokohama Stadium (1996)
- Operated: 1976–present
- Conference tie-ins: X-League 1976-present
- Previous conference tie-ins: Kantoh Collegiate American Football Association 1976-1987

The Pearl Bowl (パールボウル) is the championship game of a yearly tournament held in the spring involving the twelve teams from the East and Central Divisions of the X-League, that are based in the Kanto region.

== History ==
The Pearl Bowl was started in 1976, but matched a university team against a corporate or club team. The university teams won eight years in a row up to 1984.

The format was changed from the 10th edition in 1985 as a game between corporate or club teams. The Renown Rovers won the first of three straight titles that year.

Originally played at Korakuen Stadium, the championship game has been held in Tokyo Dome since it replaced Korakuen in 1988. The only exception has been 1996, when it was played at Yokohama Stadium. That year, West Division teams were allowed to participate, and the Matsushita Denko Impulse won the title.

The Lixil Deers have won the most titles with eight.

Year	Bowl	Stadium	Winner	Score	Runner-up	Most Valuable Player (MVP)	Attendance
1976	Pearl Bowl I	Korakuen Stadium	Nihon U. Phoenix	21-6	Tokyo Vanguards		
1977	Pearl Bowl II	Korakuen Stadium	Meiji U. Griffins	14-12	Tokyo Vanguards		
1978	Pearl Bowl III	Korakuen Stadium	Nihon U. Phoenix	62-13	Renown Rovers		
1979	Pearl Bowl IV	Korakuen Stadium	Nihon U. Phoenix	55-7	Futaba Gumi		
1980	Pearl Bowl V	Korakuen Stadium	Nihon U. Phoenix	62-6	Renown Rovers		
1981	Pearl Bowl VI	Korakuen Stadium	Nihon U. Phoenix	31-18	Nissan		
1982	Pearl Bowl VII	Korakuen Stadium	Nihon U. Phoenix	7-3	Nissan		
1983	Pearl Bowl VIII	Korakuen Stadium	Nihon U. Phoenix	51-0	Nissan		
1984	Pearl Bowl IX	Korakuen Stadium	Nihon U. Phoenix	21-17	Renown Rovers		
1985	Pearl Bowl X	Korakuen Stadium	Renown Rovers	63-7	Nissan		
1986	Pearl Bowl XI	Korakuen Stadium	Renown Rovers	45-24	Nissan		
1987	Pearl Bowl XII	Korakuen Stadium	Renown Rovers	24-8	Sanwa Bank		
1988	Pearl Bowl XIII	Tokyo Dome	NEC Falcons	23-17	Renown Rovers		
1989	Pearl Bowl XIV	Tokyo Dome	Onward Oaks	41-7	Renown Rovers		
1990	Pearl Bowl XV	Tokyo Dome	Onward Oaks	21-19	NEC Falcons		
1991	Pearl Bowl XVI	Tokyo Dome	NEC Falcons	7-2	Onward Oaks		
1992	Pearl Bowl XVII	Tokyo Dome	Onward Skylarks	28-0	Fujitsu Frontiers		
1993	Pearl Bowl XVIII	Tokyo Dome	Onward Skylarks	32-27	Fujitsu Frontiers		
1994	Pearl Bowl XIX	Tokyo Dome	Onward Skylarks	29-28	Fujitsu Frontiers		
1995	Pearl Bowl XX	Tokyo Dome	Kashima Deers	42-21	Renown Rovers		
1996	Pearl Bowl XXI	Yokohama Stadium	Matsushita Denko Impulse	18-13	Onward Skylarks		
1997	Pearl Bowl XXII	Tokyo Dome	Recruit Seagulls	31-12	Asahi Beer Silver Star		
1998	Pearl Bowl XXIII	Tokyo Dome	Kashima Deers	10-7	Onward Skylarks		
1999	Pearl Bowl XXIV	Tokyo Dome	Kashima Deers	31-7	Nissan Prince Tokyo Skyliners	DL Tsuyoshi Sekizawa, Kashima	
2000	Pearl Bowl XXV	Tokyo Dome	Recruit Seagulls	7-3	Kashima Deers	DB Yasumasa Tamanoi, Recruit	
2001	Pearl Bowl XXVI	Tokyo Dome	Onward Skylarks	34-21	Kashima Deers	Teruhiro Ura, Onward	
2002	Pearl Bowl XXVII	Tokyo Dome	Kashima Deers	20-19 OT	Recruit Seagulls	Tatsuya Shida, Kashima	
2003	Pearl Bowl XXVIII	Tokyo Dome	Fujitsu Frontiers	14-13	Obic Seagulls	Mizuguchi Takao, Fujitsu	
2004	Pearl Bowl XXIX	Tokyo Dome	Kashima Deers	17-7	Onward Skylarks	CB Tsuna Sano, Kashima	
2005	Pearl Bowl XXX	Tokyo Dome	Obic Seagulls	27-2	Asahi Beer Silver Star	QB Manabu Tasumura, Obic	
2006	Pearl Bowl XXXI	Tokyo Dome	Fujitsu Frontiers	20-6	Onward Skylarks	Makoto Tsukino, Fujitsu	13,634
2007	Tournament not held, because of the 2007 IFAF World Championship						
2008	Pearl Bowl XXXII	Tokyo Dome	Kashima Deers	27-14	Fujitsu Frontiers	RB Yasuhiro Maruta, Kashima	15,326
2009	Pearl Bowl XXXIII	Tokyo Dome	Kashima Deers	20-17	Obic Seagulls	RB Shoichiro Sato, Kashima	11,823
2010	Pearl Bowl XXXIV	Tokyo Dome	Obic Seagulls	15-13	Fujitsu Frontiers	Taiki Matsubayashi, Obic	14,066
2011	Tournament not held, because of the 2011 IFAF World Championship						
2012	Pearl Bowl XXXV	Tokyo Dome	Obic Seagulls	31-10	Fujitsu Frontiers	WR Noriaki Kinoshita, Obic	13,125
2013	Pearl Bowl XXXVI	Tokyo Dome	Kashima Deers	17-10	Fujitsu Frontiers	WR Yujiro Iwai, Kashima	19,250
2014	Pearl Bowl XXXVII	Tokyo Dome	Obic Seagulls	37-34 OT	Fujitsu Frontiers	WR Noriaki Kinoshita, Obic	16,869
2015	Tournament not held, because of the 2015 IFAF World Championship						
2016	Pearl Bowl XXXVIII	Tokyo Dome	IBM Big Blue	21-20	LIXIL Deers	WR Takeshi Kurihara, IBM	15,875
2017	Pearl Bowl XXXIX	Tokyo Dome	Obic Seagulls	29-27	IBM Big Blue	WR Taro Mizuno, Obic	16,281
2018	Pearl Bowl XL	Tokyo Dome	Obic Seagulls	28-2	IBM Big Blue	QB Skyler Howard, Obic	
2019	Pearl Bowl XLI	Tokyo Dome	Obic Seagulls	31-15	IBM Big Blue	Sachiyo Karamatsu, Obic	12,936
2020	Tournament not held, because of the COVID-19 pandemic						

== See also ==
- Green Bowl
