= Paul Rusch Cup =

- Awarded for: Most Valuable Player award for "most dominating player in the game"
- First award: January 3, 1984 to Yasuhisa Umezu
- Website: http://ricebowl.americanfootball.jp/paulrusch.html

The Paul Rusch Cup is awarded annually to the most outstanding player in American football in Japan.

== Winners ==
Year	Name	School/Team
1984	Yasuhisa Umezu	Kyoto University Gangsters
1985	Hideki Matsuka	Nihon University Phoenix
1986	Hideki Matsuka	Renown Rovers
1987	Tatsuya Tokai	Kyoto University Gangsters
1988	Tatsuya Tokai	Kyoto University Gangsters
1989	Real Suzuki	Nihon University Phoenix
1990	Toshihiko Yamaguchi	Nihon University Phoenix
1991	Yasumichi Sunaga	Nihon University Phoenix
1992	Ichiri Yamaguchi	Onward Oaks
1993	Takashi Nomure	Asahi Beer Silver Star
1994	Takashi Nomure	Asahi Beer Silver Star
1995	Sheng Uruta	Panasonic Impulse
1996	Takuro Abe	Kyoto University Gangsters
1997	Yasutaka Nakano	Obic Seagulls
1998	Jun Ogawa	Kajima Deers
1999	Nobutaka Horie	Obic Seagulls
2000	Tomo Nakamura	Asahi Beer Silver Star
2001	Tamon Nakamura	Asahi Soft Drink Challengers
2002	Yosuke Ozaki	Kwansei Gakuin Fighters
2003	Kota Yagi	Ritsumeikan Panthers
2004	Tetsuo Takada	Ritsumeikan Panthers
2005	Masahiro Nomura	Panasonic Impulse
2006	Takuya Furutani	Obic Seagulls
2007	Takashi Kojima	Onward Oaks
2008	Takuya Furutani	Panasonic Impulse
2009	Daishi Matsuda	Ritsumeikan Panthers
2010	Takashi Makiuchi	Kajima Deers
2011	Shun Sugawara	Obic Seagulls
2012	Shun Sugawara	Obic Seagulls
2013	Shun Sugawara	Obic Seagulls
2014	Takuto Hara	Obic Seagulls
2015	Gino Gordon	Fujitsu Frontiers
2016	Shun Yokota	Panasonic Impulse
2017	Colby Cameron	Fujitsu Frontiers
2018	Colby Cameron	Fujitsu Frontiers
2019	Trashaun Nixon	Fujitsu Frontiers
2020	Tsubasa Takagi	Fujitsu Frontiers

== Trophies won by school/team ==
School/team	Trophies held
Obic Seagulls	7
Fujitsu Frontiers	5
Kyoto University Gangsters	4
Nihon University Phoenix	4
Panasonic Impulse	3
Asahi Beer Silver Star	3
Ritsumeikan Panthers	3
Onward Oaks	2
Kajima Deers	2
Renown Rovers	1
Kwansei Gakuin Fighters	1
Asahi Soft Drink Challengers	1

== See also ==
- Paul Rusch
