= Gyo Shojima =

American-Japanese football player (born 1993)

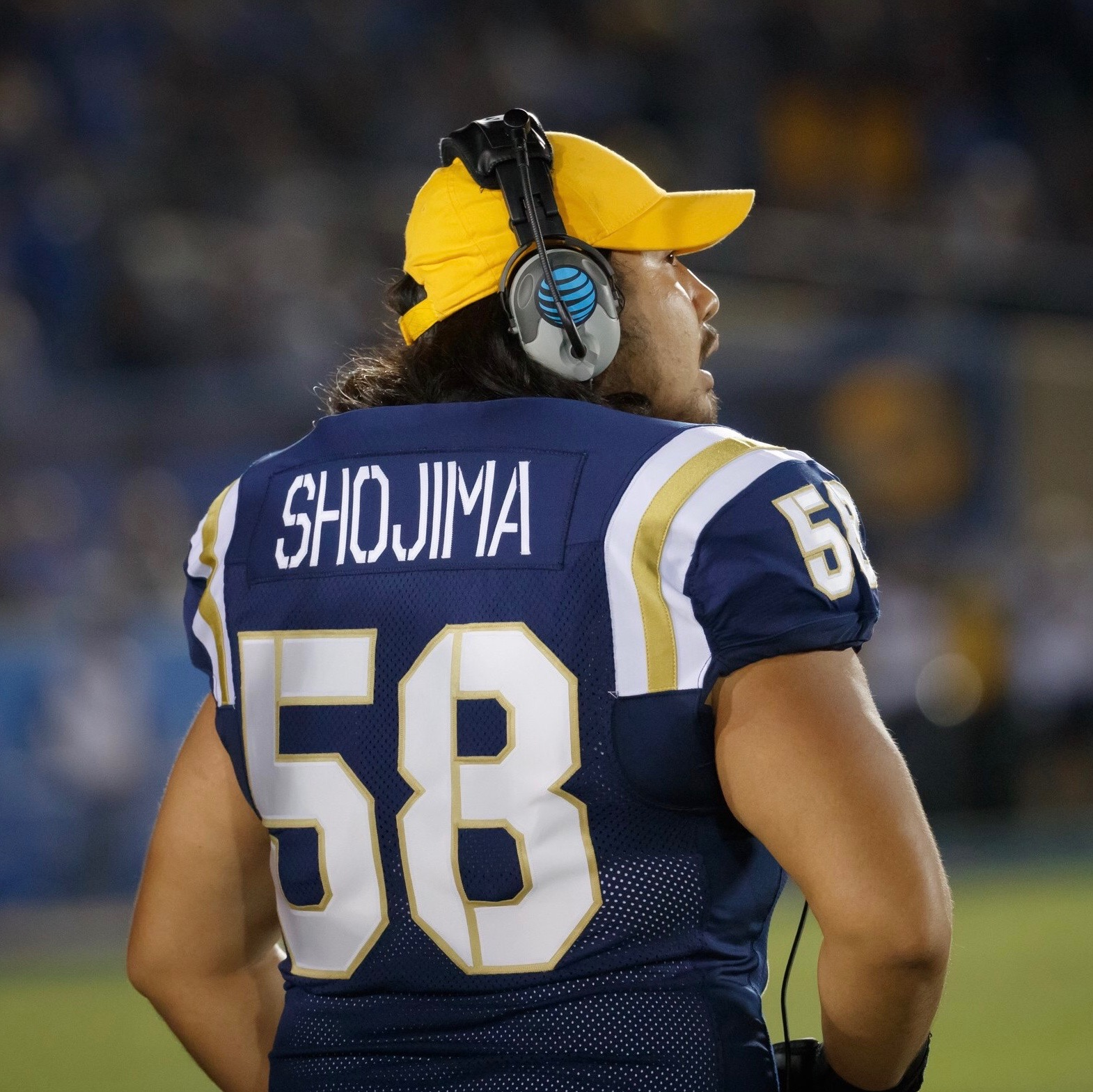
- Shojima as a redshirt junior with UCLA in 2016

No. 58
- Position: Center

Personal information
- Born: August 18, 1993 (age 33); Shibuya, Tokyo, Japan
- Listed height: 6 ft 2 in (1.88 m)
- Listed weight: 300 lb (136 kg)

Career information
- High school: (Redondo Beach, CA) Redondo Union; (Suginami, Tokyo) Tokyo Nishi Metropolitan
- College: Santa Monica College (2013–2014); UCLA (2015–2018)

Career history
- Obic Seagulls (2020–2022)

Awards and highlights
- HUDDLE magazine All X-League Offensive First-Team (2020)

Tatsuaki Gyo Shojima (庄島 辰尭 born August 18, 1993) is a former professional American football center who spent his three-year career with the Obic Seagulls of the Japanese X-League. He played college football for the UCLA Bruins as a walk-on student-athlete under head coach Jim Mora. As a redshirt junior, Shojima became the first Japanese-born student-athlete of full Japanese heritage, nationality and citizenship to play in an NCAA Division I Football Bowl Subdivision (FBS) game.

== Early life ==
Shojima was born in Tokyo, Japan to Tatsuhiro and Hiroko Shojima and at age nine, moved to Redondo Beach, California with his family.

He grew up learning Shorinji Kempo, an esoteric Japanese martial art in which he holds a black belt. He was not introduced to American football until he entered high school.

On September 30, 2010, he subdued an armed robber at a gas station. Shojima thanks his martial arts background and football experience for this accomplishment.

== Early life ==
Shojima attended Redondo Union High School, a public high school in Redondo Beach, California before transferring to Tokyo Nishi Metropolitan High School in Tokyo, Japan.

Upon graduating high school in 2012, he was selected onto the Japan national football team to compete in the IFAF Junior World Championship hosted at Austin, Texas from June 30 to July 8.

Gyo Shojima
Medal record

Men's American football

Representing Japan

IFAF Junior World Championship
Bronze medal – third place	2012 Austin, Texas	Team competition

== College career ==
=== Santa Monica College ===
After graduating from Tokyo Nishi Metropolitan high school, Shojima attended Santa Monica College. While playing for the Santa Monica Corsairs football team, he earned a starting position under head coach Gifford Lindheim. In his second season, he took on a role as a team captain. After completing two consecutive seasons as American Pacific Conference Champions at Santa Monica College, Shojima transferred to UCLA as a preferred walk-on.

=== University of California, Los Angeles ===
A Geography and Environmental Studies major, Shojima began taking classes at UCLA in September 2015. As a Bruin, he redshirted his first year and contributed on the scout team; earning a scout player award in week 4 against University of Arizona.

He continued to contribute as a scout team player during his second year at UCLA, and earned back-to-back scout player awards in week 2 against UNLV, and week 3 against BYU. During the winning game against UNLV, Shojima saw action as a reserve center, becoming the first Japanese-born student-athlete of full Japanese heritage, nationality and citizenship to play in an NCAA Division I FBS game. He continued to see action as a member of special teams versus BYU, Oregon State, USC, and Cal. He took on a role of sideline signal caller during his second season as well.

In his third and final year at UCLA, Shojima saw action as a reserve center during week 2 against University of Hawaii, and started in all 13 games as a special teams performer. In the season opener against Texas A&M, the UCLA Bruins overcame a 34-point deficit, the largest comeback in school history and the second-most ever in the Football Bowl Subdivision (FBS). After defeating California in their regular season finale, the Bruins became bowl-eligible and stayed undefeated at home for the first time since 2005. Although the Bruins were defeated by the Kansas State Wildcats in the 2017 Cactus Bowl, Shojima once again had the honor of becoming the first Japanese player to play in the Division I FBS Bowl Game.

Shojima has been named to the athletic director's academic honor roll in six consecutive academic quarters since the Spring 2016 quarter.

== Professional career ==
=== Obic Seagulls ===
In 2020, Shojima signed with the Obic Seagulls, an American football team in the Japanese X-League. He was named the starting center in the pre-season, and made his professional debut against the Tokyo Gas Creators on November 7, 2020. The Seagulls finished their season undefeated, winning their 9th national championship title after defeating the Fujitsu Frontiers 13–7 in the Japan X Bowl XXXIV and Kansei Gakuin Fighters 35–18 in the Rice Bowl LXXIV. Shojima was honored with HUDDLE magazine's First-Team X-League All Japan Offensive Player Award.

In 2021, Shojima overcame an achilles injury from earlier in the year, and made his regular season debut in Game 4 against the Tokyo Gas Creators. He started in five games with the Seagulls in 2021. Despite making the playoffs, his season ended in a 10–17 defeat against the Fujitsu Frontiers in the playoff semi-finals.

In 2022, Shojima started in the first two games with the Seagulls against the Otonari Fukuoka Suns and Elecom Kobe Finnies. However, he suffered a lower-body injury which sidelined him until the playoff semi-final game against the Panasonic Impulse. The Seagulls suffered an 10–30 defeat against Panasonic, ending their season once again in the playoff semi-final.

After completing his third season with the Obic Seagulls, Shojima announced his retirement on February 8, 2023.
