= David Stant =

American football coach

Current position
- Title: Head coach
- Team: Keio
- Conference: Kantoh Collegiate American Football Association

Playing career
- ????: Southern Oregon
- ????: Arizona Western
- 1987–1989: Hawaii
- Positions: Linebacker, Defensive lineman

Coaching career (HC unless noted)
- 1990–1992: Obic (DC/OC)
- 1993–1999: Obic
- 2003–2006: IBM Big Blue
- 2007–2012: Kamehameha Schools Kapalāma (HI) HS
- 2013–present: Keio University

Head coaching record
- Overall: 135–71–2

David Stant is an American football coach who is currently head coach of the Keio Unicorns.

== Playing career ==
=== High school ===
Stant graduated from Kahuku High School in 1981.

=== College ===
After high school Stant played for Southern Oregon, until a knee injury ended his career. He would later go on to play linebacker at Arizona Western on scholarship, then at Hawaii.

=== X-League ===
Stant did not enter the NFL draft, but rather went to Japan to play in the X-League 1990 after being scouted by the Recruit Seagulls. He started his coaching career for the Seagulls after the X-League ruled against allowing import foreign players at that time..

== Coaching career ==
=== Obic ===
In 1990, the Recruit Seagulls hired Stant to also be defensive coordinator. He also took over as offensive coordinator the next season and was promoted to head coach the next season 1993 and stayed through 1999. He would then serve as a consultant for the team the next three seasons.

=== IBM ===
In 2003, the IBM Big Blue hired Stant as their new head coach. He would stay with the team until 2006, where he compiled a 9–11–1 record.

=== Kamehameha Schools Kapālama High School ===
In February 2007, Stant was selected to serve as Kamehameha Schools Kapālama High School's new varsity head football coach. He would lead the Warriors to an HHSAA state championship and an ILH championship in 2009. The Warriors would also finish 2nd in the ILD Division II in the following 3 seasons before Stant stepped down as head coach to take the head coaching position at Keio University in Japan.

=== Keio University ===
In 2013, Stant became the head coach of the Keio Unicorns.

== Head coaching record ==
=== College ===
Year	Team	Overall	Conference	Standing	Bowl/playoffs	Coaches^{#}	AP^{°}
Keio Unicorns (Kanto League) (2013–present)
2013	Keio	9–5	6–4	3rd (Conference B)			
2014	Keio	10–5	8–3	3rd (Top 8)			
2015	Keio	10–5	8–4	4th (Top 8)			
2016	Keio	11–4	6–4	2nd (Top 8)	L,(Ritsumeikan) 6–44 Tokyo Bowl		
2017	Keio	5–9	4–8	5th (Top 8)			
Keio:		45–28	32–23				
Total:		0–0					
National championship Conference title Conference division title or championship game berth
^{†}Indicates Bowl Coalition, Bowl Alliance, BCS, or CFP / New Years' Six bowl.; ^{#}Rankings from final Coaches Poll.

=== X-League ===
Team	Year	Regular season					Postseason			
Team	Year	Won	Lost	Ties	Win %	Finish	Won	Lost	Win %	Result
Obic	1993	3	2	0	.600	3rd in East Division	—	—	—	—
Obic	1994	4	1	0	.800	2nd in East Division	—	—	—	—
Obic	1995	5	0	0	1.000	1st in East Division	1	1	.500	Lost to Matsushita Denko Impulse in Tokyo Super Bowl IX
Obic	1996	4	1	0	.800	1st in Central Division	4	0	1.000	Tokyo Super Bowl X Champions; 50th Rice Bowl Champions
Obic	1997	4	2	0	.667	3rd in Central Division	—	—	—	—
Obic	1998	4	1	0	.800	2nd in Central Division	4	0	1.000	Tokyo Super Bowl XXII Champions; 52nd Rice Bowl Champions
Obic	1999	4	1	0	.800	2nd in Central Division	1	1	.500	Lost to Kajima Deers in Semi-finals match
Obic total		28	8	0	.778		10	2	.833	
IBM	2003	0	5	0	.000	6th in East Division	—	—	—	—
IBM	2004	1	3	1	.300	4th in East Division	—	—	—	—
IBM	2005	4	1	0	.800	3rd in Central Division	—	—	—	—
IBM	2006	4	2	0	.667	3rd in East Division	—	—	—	—
IBM total		9	11	1	.452		—	—	—	
Total		37	19	1	.658		10	2	.833	
