= Noriaki Kinoshita =

Japanese gridiron football player (born 1982)

No. 18 – Obic Seagulls
- Position: Wide receiver

Personal information
- Born: December 29, 1982 (age 43); Osaka, Japan
- Listed height: 5 ft 10 in (1.78 m)
- Listed weight: 179 lb (81 kg)

Career information
- College: Ritsumeikan

Career history
- Amsterdam Admirals (2005–2007); Atlanta Falcons (2007–2008)*; New York Sentinels (2009); Obic Seagulls (2011–present)
- * Offseason or practice squad member only

Awards and highlights
- All-NFL Europe (2006); Japan X Bowl MVP award (2011); X-League Most Valuable Player (MVP) award (2012–2013); All X-League Team (2012–2014); Pearl Bowl MVP award (2012, 2014)

Noriaki Kinoshita
Medal record

Men's American football

Representing Japan

World Championship
Bronze medal – third place	2011 Austria	Team competition
Silver medal – second place	2015 USA	Team competition

Noriaki Kinoshita (木下 典明, Kinoshita Noriaki), born December 29, 1982) is a Japanese football wide receiver who currently plays for the Obic Seagulls of the X-League. He was signed by the Amsterdam Admirals in 2005. He played college football for the Ritsumeikan Panthers.

== Early life ==
Kinoshita began playing American football at the age of five, demonstrating early talent. He played in various positions: quarterback, running back, receiver, defensive back and on special teams, before settling as receiver at Ritsumeikan University, after his coach advised him that he would have the best chance in making the team if he stuck with that position.

== College career ==
He attended Ritsumeikan University, where he majored in business administration and was a standout wide receiver for the Ritsumeikan Panthers. He helped his team reach four Koshien Bowls, winning three, and helping the Panthers win 2 out of those 3 Rice Bowl (Japanese championship) games. He earned Koshien Bowl honors three times (Mills Cup, MVP, NFL Special Award).

== Professional career ==
=== Amsterdam Admirals ===
He struggled throughout the 2005 season due to an injury early on (broken finger), and difficulties with English conversation and crowd noise. He posted one reception for 12 yards and 21 yards on a single kickoff return. He was a member of the Admirals team that won the first World Bowl in their franchise history; World Bowl XIII.

Kinoshita had a standout season in 2006, helping the Amsterdam Admirals ascend to a World Bowl XIV berth for the second year in a row. He led NFL Europa on kickoff returns with an average of 27.9 for a total of 530 yards in 19 attempts with a long of 82 yards, in addition to a 59-yard punt return for a touchdown as well as 12 receptions for a total of 188 yards as a receiver. He was named Special Teams Player of the Week twice and selected to the all-NFL Europa team 2006 as special teams player.

He returned to the Amsterdam Admirals for his third NFL Europa season. In 2007, Kinoshita led NFL Europa with a 15.9-yard punt return average and ranked third with a 23.2-yard kickoff-return average. He also added 23 receptions for 364 yards and two touchdowns in what would be the final season of NFL Europa.

=== Atlanta Falcons ===
On June 28, Kinoshita signed with his favorite team, the Atlanta Falcons, and competed throughout training camp for a roster spot. "I am very excited to compete at the Falcons' training camp with other great players," says Kinoshita. "It is exciting as a Japanese player to compete with American players, and I want to appeal to the fans in Atlanta. At the same time, I want to show the Japanese people how exciting the great game of football is." He was released by the Falcons at the end of training camp.

On July 23, 2008, Kinoshita was assigned to the Falcons as an International Practice Squad player. Kinoshita was the only Japanese player of the 16 international players to sign onto NFL practice squads.

=== New York Sentinels ===
Along with players such as Adam Archuleta and B. J. Sams, Kinoshita was drafted in the first ever UFL draft by the New York Sentinels.

=== Obic Seagulls ===
As of May 2011, Kinoshita was playing for the Obic Seagulls in Japan's X-League. In 2019, he caught three touchdowns in Obic's 31–15 victory over IBM Big Blue in the Pearl Bowl and was named the game's MVP.

== Statistics ==
Year	Team	GP	GS	Receiving				Rushing			
Year	Team	GP	GS	Rec	Yards	YPC	TD	Att	Yds	Avg	TD
2011	Obic Seagulls	12	12	37	667	18.0	8	7	47	6.7	0
2012	Obic Seagulls	14	14	49	917	18.7	10	8	72	9.0	1
2013	Obic Seagulls	12	12	49	831	17.0	10	3	−3	−1.0	0
2014	Obic Seagulls	12	12	57	1,016	17.8	12	2	2	1.0	1
2015	Obic Seagulls	10	10	23	379	16.5	3	1	2	2.0	0
	Total	60	60	215	3,810	17.7	43	21	120	5.7	2
