= Skyler Howard =

American gridiron football player (born 1994)

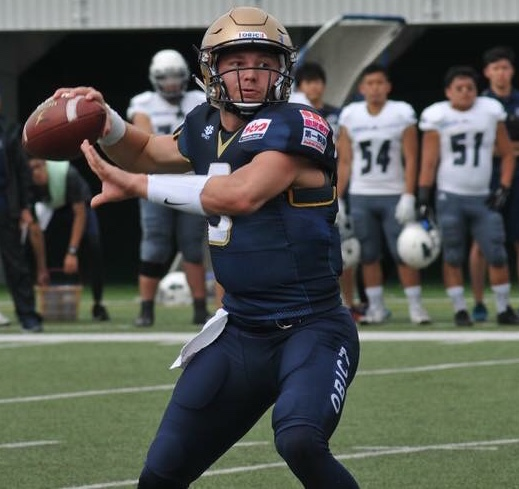

No. 3
- Position: Quarterback

Personal information
- Born: November 6, 1994 (age 32); Fort Worth, Texas, U.S.
- Listed height: 6 ft 0 in (1.83 m)
- Listed weight: 198 lb (90 kg)

Career information
- High school: Fort Worth (TX) Brewer
- College: West Virginia (2014–2016)
- NFL draft: 2017: undrafted

Career history
- Seattle Seahawks (2017)*; Toronto Argonauts (2017)*; Obic Seagulls (2018–2019)
- * Offseason or practice squad member only

Awards and highlights
- X-League: Pearl Bowl champion (2018); Pearl Bowl MVP (2018); College: Cactus Bowl champion (2016 Cactus Bowl); Cactus Bowl Offensive MVP (2016)

Skyler Howard (born November 6, 1994) is a former American professional football quarterback that most recently played for the Obic Seagulls of the Japanese X-League.

== Early life and college ==
Howard was born in Fort Worth, Texas and attended Brewer High School. Howard originally signed to play as a walk on for Stephen F. Austin State University, before opting to transfer to Riverside City College. Howard passed for over 3,000 yards and 33 touchdowns while playing for Riverside City College.

Howard transferred to WVU and joined the Mountaineers as a sophomore in 2014, playing only four games that season.

The following year, in 2015, Howard started for the Mountaineers, playing in 13 games. He helped lead his team to victory over Arizona State in the 2016 Cactus Bowl.

In 2016, Howard had the best year of his career, throwing for 3328 yards, 26 touchdowns, 10 interceptions, and a career high in completion percentage, 61.1 on 404 attempts. The Mountaineers started 6-0, but their win streak came to an end at unranked Oklahoma State, where WVU lost, 37-20, with Howard throwing 2 interceptions. Though he also threw three interceptions in a game at Texas, they still won 24-20. In Howard's final game in the 2016 Russel Athletic Bowl (now known as the Pop Tarts Bowl), WVU lost to Miami (FL), who would end a 10 year drought of bowl wins.

=== College statistics ===
Year	Team	G	GS	W – L	Passing								Rushing			
Year	Team	G	GS	W – L	Comp	Att	Pct	Yds	Y/A	TD	Int	Rtg	Att	Yds	Avg	TD
2014	West Virginia	4	2	1–1	56	110	50.9	829	7.5	8	0	138.2	22	140	6.4	0
2015	West Virginia	13	13	8–5	221	403	54.8	3145	7.8	26	14	134.7	158	502	3.2	6
2016	West Virginia	13	13	10–3	247	404	61.1	3328	8.2	26	10	146.6	142	463	3.3	10
	Total	30	28	19–9	524	917	57.1	7302	8.1	60	24	140.4	322	1105	3.4	16

== Professional career ==
=== Seattle Seahawks ===
Howard signed with the Seattle Seahawks as an undrafted free agent on May 12, 2017. He was waived by the Seahawks on June 15.

=== Toronto Argonauts ===
On September 20, 2017, Howard was signed to the practice roster of the Toronto Argonauts of the Canadian Football League. He was released from their practice roster on October 3.

=== Obic Seagulls ===
==== 2018 ====
Howard began playing overseas for the X-League of Japan. Howard started his first game completing 7 of 12 for 134 yards and 3 touchdowns, rushing 69 yards and 1 touchdown, leading the team to rout the Meijiyasuda PentaOcean Pirates 59–0 on Thursday, May 3, 2018, in the preliminary round of the Pearl Bowl preseason tournament at Fujitsu Stadium Kawasaki.

During the second round, Howard completed 12 out of 20 passes including 2 touchdowns and rushed 36 yards that helped secure a 21–6 victory over the Fujitsu Frontiers to clinch a place in the semifinals of the Pearl Bowl tournament.

Despite wet and sloppy playing conditions, Howard was leading the Obic Seagulls to a 23–10 win over the Lixil Deers. The Obic Seagulls advanced to the championship game against the IBM BigBlue on June 28 in the Tokyo Dome.

In the Pearl Bowl final, Howard completed 7 out of 14 passes for 102 yards with 1 touchdown, and rushed 63 yards. The Obic Seagulls won the IBM BigBlue 28–2. For his efforts, he was awarded the Pearl Bowl MVP.

=== Statistics ===
==== Preseason ====
Year	Team	G	GS	W – L	Passing								Rushing			
Year	Team	G	GS	W – L	Comp	Att	Pct	Yds	Y/A	TD	Int	Rtg	Att	Yds	Avg	TD
2018	Obic	4	4	4–0	39	75	52.0	640	8.5	8	2	153.5	35	229	6.5	1
	Total	4	4	4–0	39	75	52.0	640	8.5	8	2	153.5	35	229	6.5	1

==== Regular season ====
Year	Team	G	GS	W – L	Passing								Rushing			
Year	Team	G	GS	W – L	Comp	Att	Pct	Yds	Y/A	TD	Int	Rtg	Att	Yds	Avg	TD
2018	Obic	6	6	4–2	39	75	52.0	562	7.5	7	6	129.7	57	468	8.2	4
2019	Obic	5	5	4–1	54	93	58.1	763	8.2	6	4	139.7	55	210	3.8	3
	Total	11	11	8–3	93	168	55.4	1325	7.9	13	10	135.2	112	678	6.1	7
