= Tom Pratt (American football) =

American football player and coach (born 1935)

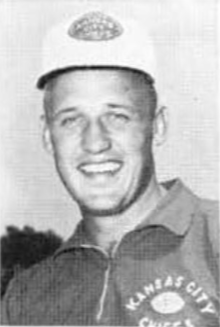
- Pratt, c. 1974

Profile
- Position: Pass rush specialist

Personal information
- Born: June 21, 1935 (age 91); Edgerton, Wisconsin, U.S.

Career information
- High school: Beloit (WI) Memorial
- College: Miami (FL)
- NFL draft: 1957: undrafted

Career history
- Miami Hurricanes (1957–1960) Assistant; Southern Miss Golden Eagles (1961–1962) Line coach; Kansas City Chiefs (1963–1977) Defensive line coach; New Orleans Saints (1978–1980) Defensive line coach; Cleveland Browns (1981–1988) Defensive line coach; Kansas City Chiefs (1989–1994) Defensive line coach; Tampa Bay Buccaneers (1995) Defensive line coach; Coast Guard Bears (1997) Defensive line coach; Asahi Challengers (1998–2000) Football ambassador; Kansas City Chiefs (2000) Assistant defensive line coach; Arizona Cardinals (2013–2017) Pass rush specialist

Awards and highlights
- Super Bowl champion (IV); 2× AFL champion (1966, 1969)

Thomas Samuel Pratt (born June 21, 1935) is an American former football coach in the National Football League (NFL) and American Football League (AFL). He played college football at the University of Miami.

== Early life ==
Pratt played high school football at Beloit Memorial High School in Beloit, Wisconsin. He earned all-state honors as a guard in 1952 while the team went undefeated.

== College career ==
Pratt played offensive guard and linebacker for the Miami Hurricanes from 1953 to 1956, earning All-American honors at linebacker his senior year in 1956. He graduated from Miami with a degree in education in 1957. He was inducted into the University of Miami Sports Hall of Fame in 1991.

== Coaching career ==
Pratt was an assistant coach for the Miami Hurricanes at the University of Miami from 1957 to 1960. He was the head freshman coach in 1957. He was then the coach of varsity guards and linebackers for the next three years. Pratt served as line coach for the Southern Miss Golden Eagles at the University of Southern Mississippi from 1961 to 1962. Pratt was the defensive line coach for the Kansas City Chiefs from 1963 to 1977, helping the team win the AFL championship in 1966 and 1969 while also winning Super Bowl IV. He served as defensive line coach of the New Orleans Saints from 1978 to 1980. He was defensive line coach of the Cleveland Browns from 1981 to 1988. Pratt served as defensive line coach of the Kansas City Chiefs from 1989 to 1994. He was defensive line coach of the Tampa Bay Buccaneers in 1995.

Pratt served as defensive line coach of the Coast Guard Bears at the United States Coast Guard Academy in 1997. He served as a football ambassador in Osaka, Japan for the Asahi Challengers of the X-League from 1998 to 1999. He returned to help the Challengers win the Japan Super Bowl in 2000. He returned to the Chiefs as the assistant defensive line coach in 2000. Pratt became pass rush specialist for the Arizona Cardinals in 2013. He had previously spent three years as a defensive coordinator consultant with IMG Academy prior to joining the Cardinals.

== Personal life ==
Pratt has also spent time as a consultant to Kyoto University.
