= Taku Lee =

Japanese gridiron football player (born 1995)

No. 29 – Obic Seagulls
- Position: Running back

Personal information
- Born: February 20, 1995 (age 31); Nagoya, Japan
- Listed height: 5 ft 11 in (1.80 m)
- Listed weight: 195 lb (88 kg)

Career information
- High school: Nanzan (Nagoya)
- College: Keio University
- CFL draft: 2021G: 3rd round, 24th overall pick

Career history
- Obic Seagulls (2017–2020); Montreal Alouettes (2021–2022); Obic Seagulls (2023–present)

Awards and highlights
- X-League champion (2020); Rice Bowl champion (2020); Japan X Bowl MVP (2020); 2x All X-League Team (2019, 2020); X-League Best Rookie Award (2017)
- Stats at CFL.ca

Taku Lee (born February 20, 1995) is a Japanese professional gridiron football running back for the Obic Seagulls of the Japanese X-League.

== Early life ==
After enrolling in Nanzan Junior High School, Lee started playing American football. He played as a running back from that time on.

== College career ==
After graduating high school, he went on to Keio University's Faculty of Policy Management, where he joined the American football club. During his time at Keio, he served as team captain and was the leading rusher in the Kantō region in his junior and senior years and was selected for the Kanto Best 11. In his senior year, he won the MVP award at the College Bowl. As a member of the Japanese national team, he was selected to represent Japan in the U-19 World Championship in his sophomore year (but did not participate). In his junior year, he was selected to represent Japan in the Senior World Championship. In his senior year, he also represented Japan in the University World Championship as a member of the college team.

== Professional career ==
=== Obic Seagulls ===
After graduating from Keio, Lee joined Japan Airlines, but in parallel, he joined the Obic Seagulls in 2017. In the same year, he won the X-League's Best Rookie Award. In 2018, he served as vice captain and offensive leader and left Japan Airlines in the fall of the same year to focus on American football and challenge the NFL. In the spring of 2019, he participated in The Spring League scouting event and was invited to try out for the XFL. In the spring of 2020, Lee was invited to the Canadian Football League (CFL) Global Combine. (Note: The 2020 season had later been cancelled due to the COVID-19 pandemic.) He was selected for the All X-League Team for two consecutive years in 2019 and 2020. He won the MVP award at the 2020 Japan X Bowl. In January 2021, Lee was invited to the NFL's International Player Pathway (IPP) program camp as a candidate player.

=== Montreal Alouettes ===
On April 15, 2021, Lee was selected in the 2021 CFL global draft by the Montreal Alouettes in the third round as the 24th overall pick. He had been aiming to join the NFL, but after not being drafted he gave up and joined Montreal. On September 18, he played in a game against the BC Lions, becoming the third Japanese player to play in the CFL after Les Maruo (Winnipeg Blue Bombers) and Takeru Yamasaki (BC Lions).

=== Obic Seagulls (second stint) ===
On November 1, 2022, with the end of the CFL regular season, Lee returned to Japan and joined the Seagulls, returning to his former team. From this season, he renewed his contract as a professional player with Japanese nationality.

== Personal life ==
Since Lee was in high school, his goal was to become an airline pilot. After graduating from college, he joined Japan Airlines as a pilot trainee, a position that is said to have a 100 to 1 ratio, and was assigned to Narita International Airport. However, he left the company after a year and a half to focus on his challenge in the NFL.

Lee is a fourth-generation Korean resident of Japan who later acquired Japanese citizenship in 2014.

== Professional record ==
| Season | Team | Match | | Run | | | | | Return | | |
| Season | Team | GP | GS | Att | Yds | Avg | Lng | TD | Att | Yds | TD |
|---|---|---|---|---|---|---|---|---|---|---|---|
| 2019 | OS | 7 | 6 | 54 | 527 | 9.8 | 68 | 2 | - | - | - |
| 2020 | OS | 2 | 2 | 22 | 175 | 8.0 | 34 | 2 | - | - | - |
| 2021 | MTL | 4 | 4 | - | - | - | - | - | 2 | 48 | 0 |
| 2022 | MTL | 0 | 0 | - | - | - | - | - | - | - | - |
| 2023 | OS | 5 | 5 | 40 | 271 | 6.8 | 54 | 1 | - | - | - |
| Total | | 48 | 17 | 116 | 973 | 8.4 | 54 | 5 | 2 | 48 | 0 |
