= Kansai Kaisers football =

2016 Kansai Kaisers football team
- First season: 1935
- Location: Suita, Osaka, Japan
- Conference: Kansai Collegiate American Football League
- Division: Division 1
- Colors: Blue and Gold
- Website: Kansai Kasiers football

The Kansai Kaisers football program represents Kansai University in college football. Kansai is a member of the Kansai Collegiate American Football League (KCAFL).

== History ==
In 1935, Kansai Kaisers was established. They are one of the three members which established KCAFL.

In 1948, they won their first Koshien Bowl, beating Meiji University 6–0. They qualified to Koshien for two consecutive years but this time they were defeated by Keio Gijuku University 7–14.

For next 6 decades, they missed Koshien Bowl as Kwansei Gakuin University dominates Kansai League. Also, rise of Ritsumeikan University and Kyoto University led the Kaisers to relegation to Div. 2 from late 1980's to early 2000's.

However, the team started rising and in 2009, their hard work paid off and became a national champion for the first time in 61 years. In 2010, they became back to back league champion, along with Fighters and Panthers but could not make it to Koshien Bowl after losing to Fighters in the play-off.

In 2023, they became the league champion for the first time in 13 years, along with Fighters and Panthers. However, the Kaisers missed the playoff since Fighters got the tickets after the drawing of lots.

In 2024, new play-off system was introduced this season as the league expanded the number of teams to qualify for the knockout stages to 3 teams. Kaisers secured 3rd seed as they won final league game against Kyoto University. However, they lost against Waseda University in Quarterfinal.
