= Nojima Sagamihara Rise =

American football team based in Sagamihara City, Kanagawa, Japan

General information
- Founded: 2009
- Headquartered: Sagamihara City, Kanagawa
- Colours: Navy and Orange
- Website: https://www.sagamihara-rise.com/

Personnel
- Head coach: Ichiro Jogataki

League / conference affiliations
- X-League; X1 Super Division

Championships
- Division championships: 2 (2017, 2018)

The Nojima Sagamihara Rise are an American football team located in Sagamihara City, Kanagawa, Japan. They are a member of the X-League.

Similar to how fellow X-League member Elecom Kobe Finies's visual identity is inspired by the National Football League's Dallas Cowboys, the Nojima Sagamihara Rise's visual identity is inspired by the Denver Broncos, primarily in respect to its colors (navy blue and orange), logo (A charging horse with a flame-like mane) and uniforms (The Rise's home jersey is navy blue with orange accents - similar to the Broncos' 1997-2011 home jersey/2012-present alternate jersey), though the shade of orange which the Rise uses is closer to red.

== Team history ==
- 2009 Team founded. First named Sagamihara Rise. Promoted from X3 to X2 at the end of the year.
- 2010 Won X-League replacement game. Promoted from X2 to X1 for the following year.
- 2011 Naming rights contract with the Nojima Corporation. Team name changed to Nojima Sagamihara Rise. Advanced to the Final Stage.
- 2012 Advanced to the Final stage for the 2nd consecutive year.
- 2015 Advanced to the Final stage. Lost to eventual champion Panasonic Impulse 45-17.

== Seasons ==
X-League champions (1987–present)	Division champions	Final Stage/Semifinals Berth	Wild Card /2nd Stage Berth

Season	League	Division	Regular Season				Postseason results	Awards	Head coaches
Season	League	Division	Finish	Wins	Losses	Ties	Postseason results	Awards	Head coaches
2009	X3	East	1st	7	0	0			
2010	X2	East	1st	8	0	0	Won X2 Semi-Final match (Sony Solidstate) 55-0; Won X2-X1 Promotion match (Hurricanes) 57-0		
2011	X1	Central	2nd	4	3	0	Won 2nd stage match (As One) 35-7; Won 2nd stage match (Kashima) 27-20 OT; Lost Final stage match (Fujitsu) 3-38		Takayuki Sunaga
2012	X1	East	2nd	6	2	0	Lost 2nd stage match (IBM)17-48; Won 2nd stage match (at Panasonic) 28-27; Lost Final stage match (at Obic) 10-24		Takayuki Sunaga
2013	X1	Central	2nd	6	2	0	Won 2nd stage match (at As One) 42-7; Lost 2nd stage match (at Fujitsu) 24-45		Takayuki Sunaga
2014	X1	East	3rd	5	3	0	Won 2nd stage match (Elecom Kobe) 44-14; Lost 2nd stage match (at Obic) 21-44.		Takayuki Sunaga
2015	X1	East	2nd	4	3	0	Won 2nd stage match (Asahi Beer) 14-7 OT; Lost 2nd stage match (at Panasonic) 0-36; Lost Final stage match (at Panasonic) 17-45		Takayuki Sunaga
2016	X1	Central	3rd	3	6	0	Won Super9/Battle9 classification match (Tokyo Gas) 69-7	Devin Gardner (ROY)	Takayuki Sunaga
2017	X1	Central	1st	6	3	0	Lost Quarterfinals match (Obic) 22-41		Takayuki Sunaga
2018	X1	Central	1st	6	3	0	Lost Quarterfinals match (Obic) 25-42		Takayuki Sunaga
2019	X1	Super	8th	3	7	0	Won X1 Super-Area relegation match (Asahi Beer) 32-20		Takayuki Sunaga
2020	X1	Super	2nd	2	1	0		Kurt Palandech (X1 Super ROY)	Ichiro Jogataki
2021	X1	Super	5th	3	4	0			Ichiro Jogataki
2022	X1 Super	Div. A	3rd	3	2	0	Lost Quarterfinals match (at Obic) 9-21		Ichiro Jogataki
2023	X1 Super	Div. A	3rd	6	4	0	Lost Quarterfinals match (IBM) 21-24		Ichiro Jogataki
2024	X1 Super		6th	3	3	1	Lost Quarterfinals match (at Obic) 14-20	Tayvian Cunningham (X1 Super ROY)	Ichiro Jogataki
2025	X1 Super	Central	2nd	6	2	1	Lost Quarterfinals match (Fujitsu) 28-42		Ichiro Jogataki
Total				78	44	2	(2009–2025, includes only regular season)		
Total				10	13		(2009–2025, includes only playoffs)		
Total				88	57	2	(2009–2025, includes both regular season and playoffs)		

== Current import players ==
Jersey #	Name	Position	Years with the team	Alma mater	Achievements
#19	Tayvian Cunningham	WR	2024–present	University of Arizona	X1 Super ROY Award (2024); 2x All-X1 Super Team member (2024, 2025)
#6	Kurt Palandech	QB	2020–present	UNLV	X1 Super ROY Award (2020); All-X1 Super Team member (2025)
#99	Philip Redwine	LB	2023–present	Oklahoma State	All X1 Super Team member (2025)

Former import players

Name	Position	Years with the team	Alma mater	Achievements
Kris Vaghn	WR	2023	UC Davis	
Colby Campbell	LB	2023	Duke	
Daniel Jenkins	TE	2021–2022	Rocky Mountain College	
Lee Hightower	S	2018–2022	Houston	
Mike Scott Jr.	DL	2021	Oklahoma State	
Jimmy Laughrea	QB	2018–2019	UC Davis	
Quentin Jones	DB	2019	Lehigh	
Damien Parris	LT	2019	Houston	
Hayden Plinke	TE	2018	UTEP	
Michael Griffin	CB	2018	Ashland	
Sione Houma	RB	2017	Michigan	
Mario Ojemudia	DL	2017	Michigan	
Devin Gardner	QB	2016–2017	Michigan	ROY award (2016); All X-League Team member (2017)
Earnest Thomas III	SS	2016	Illinois	
Art Laurel	OLB	2015–2016	Hawai'i	
Jeremy Gallon	WR	2016	Michigan	All X-League Team member (2016)
Tavita Woodard	DE	2014	Hawai'i	
Loka Kanongataa	S	2013–2014	San Diego	
Keith Ah-Soon	OG	2011–2013	Hawai'i	All X-League Team member (2013)
Rocky Pouta-Alo	FS/RB	2010–2011	Indiana State	
Reggie Mitchell	CB	2009–2012	UNLV	All X-League Team member (2008)
Benjamin Anderson	QB	2015	UAPB	
Derek Faavi	OT	2011–2015	Hawai'i	2x All X-League Team member (2011, 2014)
Manu Ngatikaura	CB	2015	San Jose State	
Tuika Tufaga	DT	2012–2013	Hawai'i	
