= Stant =

Stant is a surname. Notable people with the surname include:

- Charlotte Stant, character in The Golden Bowl
- David Stant (born 1964), American American football coach
- Phil Stant (born 1962), English football player
- Shane Stant, involved in the 1994 Cobo Arena attack
