= Shay Fields =

American gridiron football player (born 1996)

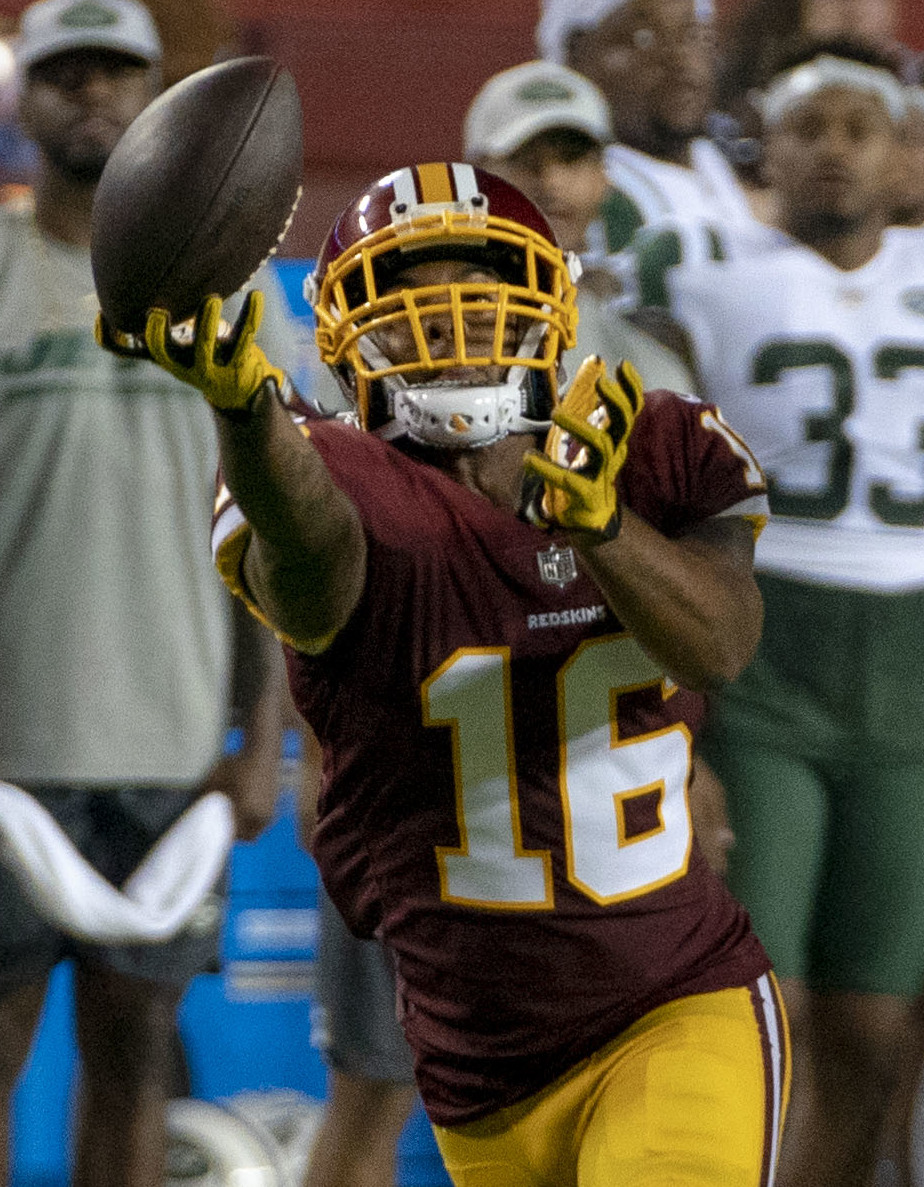
- Fields with the Washington Redskins in 2018

No. 16
- Position: Wide receiver

Personal information
- Born: June 22, 1996 (age 30); Bellflower, California, U.S.
- Listed height: 5 ft 11 in (1.80 m)
- Listed weight: 188 lb (85 kg)

Career information
- High school: St. John Bosco (Bellflower, California)
- College: Colorado
- NFL draft: 2018: undrafted

Career history
- Washington Redskins (2018)*; Denver Broncos (2018)*; San Diego Fleet (2019); Calgary Stampeders (2019)*; Panasonic Impulse (2021); Vegas Knight Hawks (2022)
- * Offseason or practice squad member only

Shay Fields (born June 22, 1996) is an American former professional football wide receiver. He played college football for Colorado. He previously played for the Washington Redskins and Denver Broncos of the National Football League (NFL), San Diego Fleet of the Alliance of American Football (AAF), Calgary Stampeders of the Canadian Football League (CFL), and Panasonic Impulse of the X-League.

== College career ==
Fields ranked second in Colorado history in receiving yards (2,552), third in receptions (190) and tied for third in receiving touchdowns (21).

== Professional career ==
=== Washington Redskins ===
Fields was signed by the Washington Redskins as an undrafted free agent on May 2, 2018.

On September 1, 2018, Fields was waived for final roster cuts before the start of the 2018 season.

=== Denver Broncos ===
On December 11, 2018, Fields was signed to the Denver Broncos practice squad.

=== San Diego Fleet ===
On January 10, 2019, Fields signed with the San Diego Fleet of the Alliance of American Football (AAF). However, he was placed on injured reserve before the start of the regular season. He was waived on February 23, 2019. He was added to the team's rights list and re-signed to a contract on March 19. He was activated to the roster on March 20.

=== Calgary Stampeders ===
After the AAF suspended operations, Fields signed with the Calgary Stampeders of the Canadian Football League (CFL) on April 29, 2019.

=== Panasonic Impulse ===
In 2021, Fields signed with the Panasonic Impulse in the X-League in Japan.

=== Vegas Knight Hawks ===
On May 4, 2022, Fields signed with the Vegas Knight Hawks in the Indoor Football League (IFL).
