= Mike Phair =

American football coach (born 1969)

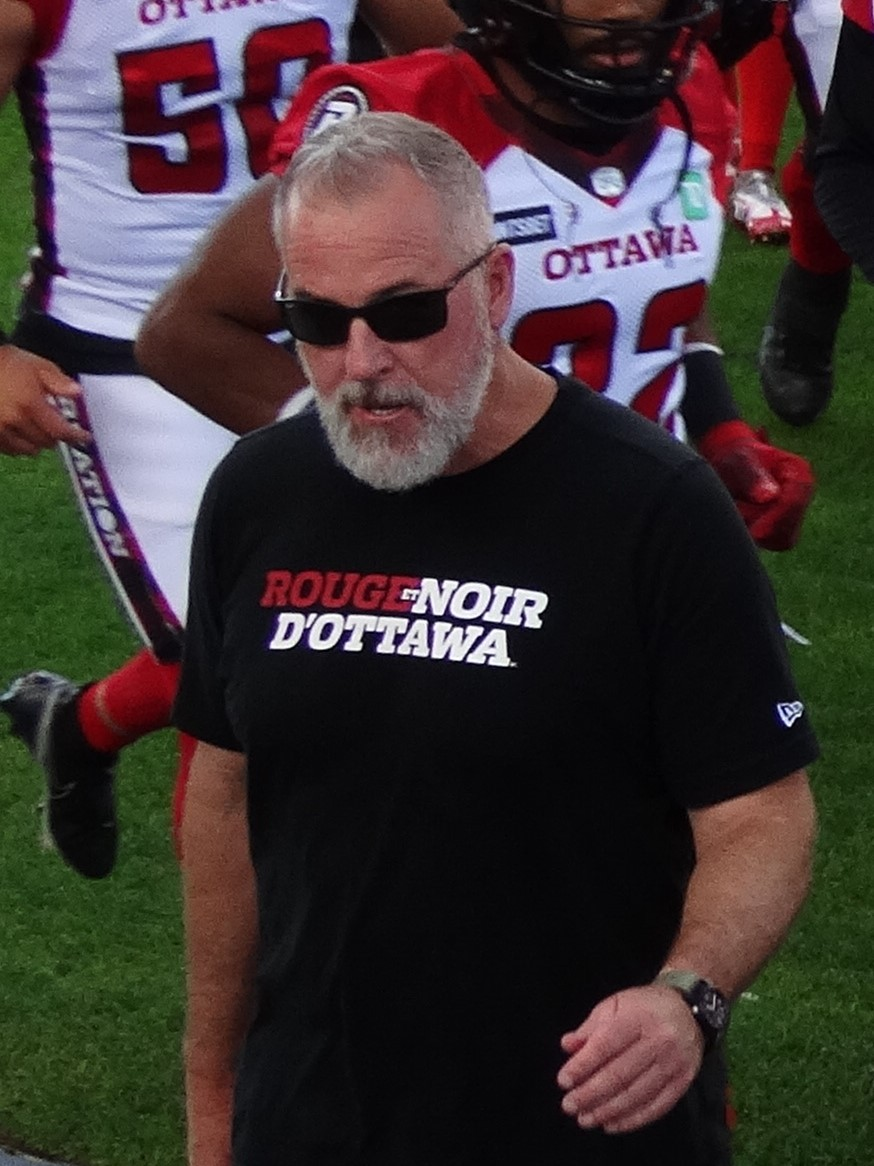
- Phair with the Ottawa Redblacks in 2022

Orlando Storm
- Title: Linebackers coach

Personal information
- Born: November 8, 1969 (age 56); Mesa, Arizona, U.S.

Career information
- High school: Mesa, Arizona
- College: Arizona State

Career history

Coaching
- Arizona State (1999–2000) Graduate assistant & defensive line coach; Tiffin (2001) Linebackers coach & special teams coach; Seattle Seahawks (2008) Assistant linebackers coach; Seattle Seahawks (2009) Assistant defensive line coach; Seattle Seahawks (2010) Defensive assistant; Chicago Bears (2011–2013) Defensive line coach; Tampa Bay Buccaneers (2014) Assistant defensive line coach; Illinois (2015) Co-defensive coordinator & defensive line coach; Illinois (2016–2017) Run game coordinator & defensive line coach; Indianapolis Colts (2018–2019) Defensive line coach; Carolina Panthers (2020) Defensive line coach; Stanford University (2021) Defensive Assistant Volunteer; Ottawa Redblacks (2022) Defensive line coach; Ottawa Redblacks (2023) Run game coordinator & defensive line coach; IBM Big Blue (2023) Defense consultant; IBM Big Blue (2024–2025) Head coach & General Manager; Orlando Storm (2026–present) Linebackers coach

Operations
- Tampa Bay Buccaneers (2002–2004) Scout; Seattle Seahawks (2005–2007) Scout

Awards and highlights
- Super Bowl champion (XXXVII) 2003

Mike Phair (born November 8, 1969) is an American football coach who is current the linebackers coach for the Orlando Storm of the United Football League (UFL). He previously served as an assistant coach for the Seattle Seahawks, Chicago Bears, Tampa Bay Buccaneers, Indianapolis Colts, Carolina Panthers, and Ottawa Redblacks.

== Coaching career ==
=== Arizona State ===
In 1999, Phair began his coaching career as a graduate assistant and defensive line coach at Arizona State.

=== Tiffin University ===
In 2001, Phair was hired as a linebackers coach and special teams coach at Tiffin University.

=== Seattle Seahawks ===
After three years as a scout with the organization, in 2008, Phair was hired by the Seattle Seahawks as an assistant linebackers coach. In 2009, he was promoted to assistant defensive line coach. In 2010, he served as a defensive assistant.

=== Chicago Bears ===
In 2011, Phair was hired by the Chicago Bears as their defensive line coach.

=== Tampa Bay Buccaneers ===
In 2014, Phair was hired by the Tampa Bay Buccaneers as an assistant defensive line coach.

=== Illinois ===
In 2015, Phair was hired as a co-defensive coordinator and defensive line coach at Illinois. In 2016, he moved to run game coordinator and defensive line coach.

=== Indianapolis Colts ===
On January 26, 2018, Phair was hired by the Indianapolis Colts as their defensive line coach under head coach Frank Reich.

=== Carolina Panthers ===
On January 13, 2020, Phair was hired by the Carolina Panthers as their defensive line coach under head coach Matt Rhule.

=== Stanford University ===
On August 4, 2021, Phair was hired by Stanford Football as a Defensive Assistant Volunteer under head coach David Shaw.

=== Ottawa Redblacks ===
On April 25, 2022, it was announced that Phair had been hired by the Ottawa Redblacks as their defensive line coach under head coach Paul LaPolice. In 2023, he moved to run game coordinator and defensive line coach.
