= Les Maruo =

Japanese gridiron football player (born 1996)

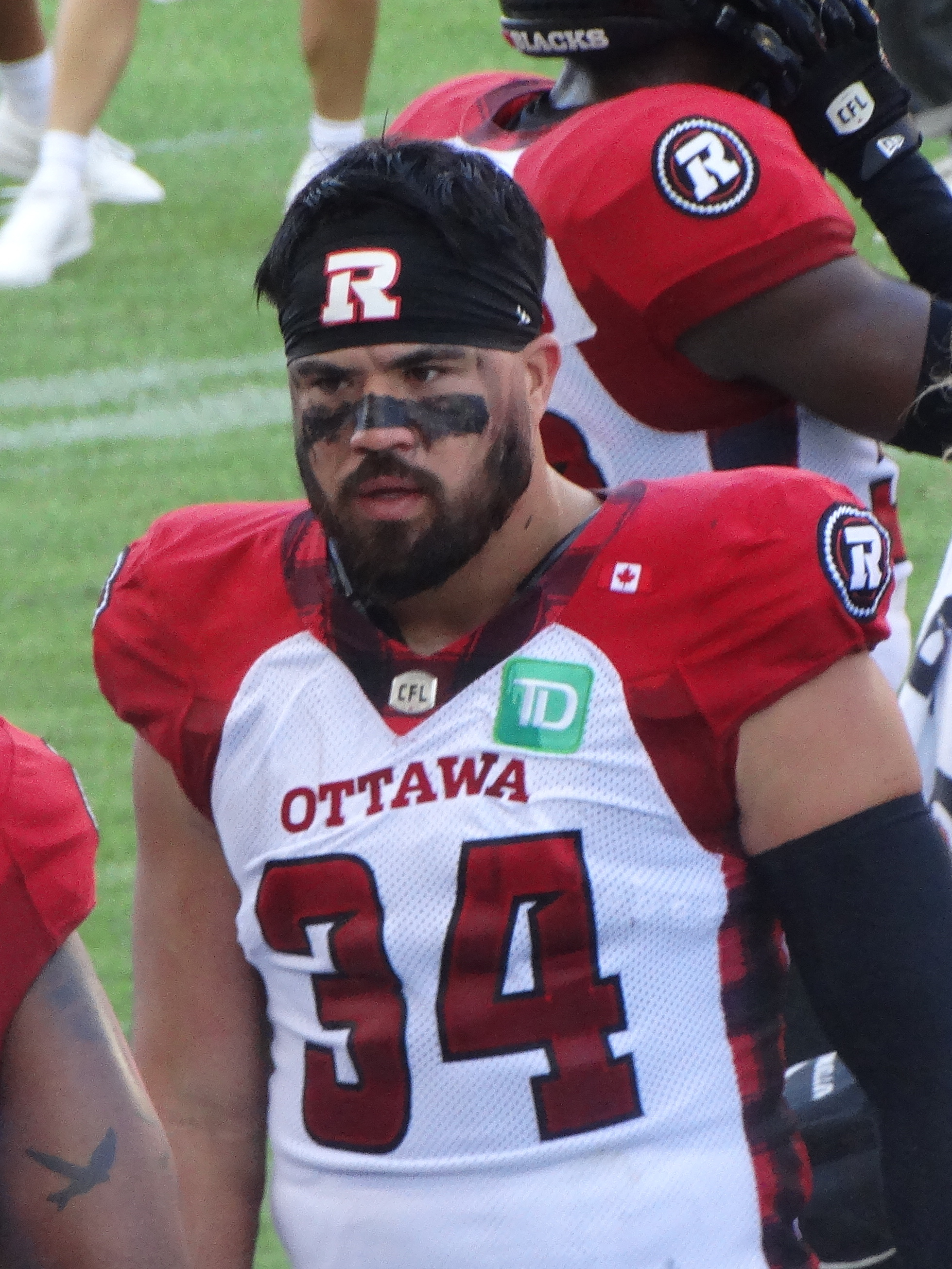
- Maruo with the Ottawa Redblacks in 2025

Profile
- Position: Linebacker

Personal information
- Born: February 14, 1996 (age 30); Yokkaichi, Mie, Japan
- Listed height: 6 ft 0 in (1.83 m)
- Listed weight: 225 lb (102 kg)

Career information
- High school: Goddard (Goddard, Kansas, U.S.)
- College: Texas-San Antonio; Hutchinson Community College
- CFL draft: 2021G: 1st round, 4th overall pick

Career history
- 2019–2020: Asahi Soft Drink Challengers
- 2021–2023: Winnipeg Blue Bombers
- 2024: Edmonton Elks
- 2025: Ottawa Redblacks

Awards and highlights
- Grey Cup champion (2021)
- Stats at CFL.ca

Les Maruo (丸尾 玲寿里, Maruo Resuri, born February 14, 1996) is a Japanese professional gridiron football linebacker. He most recently played for the Ottawa Redblacks of the Canadian Football League (CFL).

== Early life ==
Maruo attended Goddard High School in Wichita, Kansas. As a senior on the football team, he recorded 79 tackles in nine games.

== College career ==
Maruo first played college football for the Hutchinson Blue Dragons from 2014 to 2015. He then transferred to the University of Texas at San Antonio, though he used a redshirt season in 2016 after compartment syndrome forced him to undergo surgery on both of his calves. He played for the Roadrunners from 2017 to 2018 where he started all 12 games in his senior year.

== Professional career ==
=== Asahi Soft Drink Challengers ===
After being overlooked by the National Football League and Canadian Football League, Maruo began his professional career with the Asahi Soft Drink Challengers of the X-League in 2019. He played for the Challengers for two years.

=== Winnipeg Blue Bombers ===
Maruo originally participated in the 2020 CFL Global Combine, but he was under contract with the Challengers, and could not play in the CFL. Instead, he returned in 2021 where he was selected with the fourth overall pick in the 2021 CFL global draft by the Winnipeg Blue Bombers and signed with the team on April 26, 2021.

Following training camp, Maruo made the team's active roster and made his CFL debut in week 1 against the Hamilton Tiger-Cats on August 5, 2021. He played in the team's first seven games where he had six special teams tackles before shifting to the practice roster for the remainder of the year. While he didn't play in the game, Maruo became a Grey Cup champion when the Blue Bombers defeated the Tiger-Cats in the 108th Grey Cup. He re-signed with the Blue Bombers on December 28, 2021.

In 2022, Maruo again made the team's opening day roster and began to see more playing time on defense. He recorded his first career sack on July 22, 2022, in a game against the Edmonton Elks when he tackled Taylor Cornelius. He played in 17 regular season games that year where he had 14 defensive tackles, seven special teams tackles, and one sack. He also played in both postseason games, including the 109th Grey Cup, where he recorded two special teams tackles in the loss to the Toronto Argonauts.

=== Edmonton Elks ===
Maruo was signed to the practice roster of the Edmonton Elks on July 7, 2024. He played in nine regular season games where he recorded eight special teams tackles. He became a free agent on February 11, 2025.

=== Ottawa Redblacks ===
On June 1, 2025, Maruo signed a practice roster agreement with the Ottawa Redblacks. He appeared in three regular season games where he had two special teams tackles. He became a free agent upon the expiry of his contract on February 10, 2026.

== Personal life ==
Maruo was born in Yokkaichi, Mie, Japan, and moved to Shizuoka when he was three years old. He then moved to Wichita, Kansas, with his family when he was nine years old. He picked up the English language in less than a year. His brother, Sean, went on to play college baseball at Nebraska–Kearney.

Maruo's father was Scottish but died due to a car accident when Maruo was three years old.
