= Keio Unicorns football =

2016 Keio Unicorns football team
- First season: 1935
- Head coach: David Stant
- Location: Minato, Tokyo, Japan
- Conference: Kantoh Collegiate American Football Association
- Division: Top 8
- Colors: Blue and Red

National championships
- Claimed: 2 (1946, 1948)
- Outfitter: Under Armour
- Website: Keio American Football Team

The Keio Unicorns football program represents the Keio University in college football. They are members of the Kantoh Collegiate American Football Association. They are coached by David Stant.
