= Asahi Beer Silver Star =

Japanese football team

Oriental Bio Silver Star

General information
- Founded: 1970
- Headquartered: Kawasaki City, Kanagawa
- Colors: Navy Blue and Silver
- Website: http://www.asahibeer.co.jp/silver/

Personnel
- Head coach: Hayato Arima

League / conference affiliations
- X-League; East

Championships
- Japan X Bowl titles: 4 (1989, 1992, 1993, 1999)
- Division championships: 3 (1997, 2006, 2009)

The Oriental Bio Silver Star are an American football team located in Kawasaki City, Kanagawa, Japan. They are a member of the X-League.

== Team history ==
- 1970 Team founded as Asahi Beer Silver Star
- 1989 Won first Tokyo Super Bowl championship.
- 1993 Won first Rice Bowl National Championship.
- 1999 Won fourth Tokyo Super Bowl championship.
- 2009 Won Eastern divisional title. Advanced to the Final stage where they lost to eventual X-League runner up, the Fujitsu Frontiers 31–21.
- 2024 Asahi Breweries ends team sponsorship. Oriental Bio Co, LTD. takes over sponsorship. Team renamed Oriental Bio Silver Star

== Seasons ==
X-League champions (1987–present)	Division champions	Final Stage/Semi-finals Berth	Wild Card /2nd Stage Berth

Season	Division	Regular Season				Postseason results	Awards	Head coaches
Season	Division	Finish	Wins	Losses	Ties	Postseason results	Awards	Head coaches
1997	East	1st	5	1	0	Won Wild card match ( Nissan Prince Tokyo) 31–13; Lost semi-finals match (at Matsushita Electric Works) 6–26		Abe
1998	East	2nd	4	1	0	Won Wild card match (at Matsushita Electric Works) 26–10; Won Semi-finals match (Kashima) 38–13; Lost Tokyo Super Bowl XII (at Recruit) 24–45		Abe
1999	Central	2nd	4	1	0	Won Wild card match (Onward) 23–13; Won Semi-finals match (at Asahi Soft Drinks) 20–15; Won Tokyo Super Bowl XIII (Kashima) 18–16; Won 53rd Rice Bowl National Championship game (Kwansei Gakuin 33–17		Abe
2000	East	2nd	4	2	0	Lost Wild card match (at Asahi Soft Drinks)		Abe
2001	Central	2nd	4	2	0	Lost Wild card match (at Asahi Soft Drinks) 6–24		Abe
2002	Central	3rd	3	3	0			Fukabori
2003	East	2nd	6	2	2	Won Wild Card match (at Kashima) 7–3; Won Semi-finals match (at Matsushita Electric Works) 21–14; Lost Japan X Bowl XVII (at Onward) 10–13		Fukabori
2004	East	2nd	5	4	0	Won Wild Card match (at Asahi Soft Drinks) 10–7; Won Semi-finals match (at Onward) 13–10; Lost Japan X Bowl XVIII (at Matsushita Denko) 6–15		Fukabori
2005	Central	2nd	9	2	0	Won Wild Card match (at Asahi Soft Drinks) 22–19; Lost semi-finals match (at Obic) 7–13		Fukabori
2006	Central	1st	7	2	0	Lost Wild Card match (Kashima) 6–14		
2007	East	3rd	6	1	0			
2008	East	3rd	9	3	0			
2009	East	1st	8	2	0	Won 2nd stage match (Suita) 22–20; Lost 2nd Stage match (Kashima) 14–24; Lost final stage match (Fujitsu) 21–31		Kiyoshi Oka
2010	East	3rd	6	4	0	Lost 2nd stage match (Panasonic) 19–24; Lost 2nd stage match (Fujitsu) 3–34		Kiyoshi Oka
2011	Central	3rd	5	3	1	Lost 2nd stage match (Panasonic) 10–28; Lost 2nd stage match (Fujitsu) 14–58		Kiyoshi Oka
2012	East	3rd	6	3	0	Lost 2nd stage match (at Obic) 7–69; Won 2nd stage match (Asahi Soft Drinks) 26–20 OT		Kiyoshi Oka
2013	East	3rd	4	3	0	Lost 2nd stage match (at Obic) 7–21; Won 2nd stage match (Asahi Soft Drinks) 34–10		Kiyoshi Oka
2014	Central	3rd	5	3	0	Lost 2nd stage match (at Fujitsu) 0–65; Lost 2nd stage match (Panasonic) 3–65		Kiyoshi Oka
2015	Central	3rd	6	1	0	Lost 2nd stage match (Panasonic) 14–38; Lost 2nd Stage match (at Nojima Sagamihara) 7–14 OT	Mason Mills (ROY)	Kiyoshi Oka
2016	East	3rd	4	5	0	Lost quarterfinals match (at Panasonic) 14–21; Won Super9/Battle9 classification match (All Mitsubishi) 17–0		Kiyoshi Oka
2017	East	3rd	3	6	0	Lost Wildcard match (All Mitsubishi) 17–20		Hayato Arima
2018	East	3rd	3	6	0	Lost Wildcard match (All Mitsubishi) 6–17		Hayato Arima
2019	X1 Area East	1st	5	4	0	Won X1 Area Final (Asahi Soft Drinks) 34–31; Lost X1 Area-Super promotional match (at Nojima Sagamihara) 20–32		Hayato Arima
2020	X1 Area East		2	1	0			Hayato Arima
2021	X1 Area East	1st	6	0	0		Hiroshi Kawamura (X1 Area MVP)	Hayato Arima
2022	X1 Super Div. A	4th	2	3	0	Lost quarterfinals match (at Fujitsu) 3–53		Hayato Arima
2023	X1 Super Div. B	4th	3	4	0	Lost quarterfinals match (at Panasonic) 0–27		Hayato Arima
2024	X1 Super	9th	3	5	0			Hayato Arima
2025	X1 Super Central	3rd	2	6	0			Kiyoshi Oka
Total			127	77	3	(1997–2025, includes only regular season)		
Total			16	24	0	(1997–2025, includes only playoffs)		
Total			143	101	3	(1997–2025, includes both regular season and playoffs)		

== Current import players ==
Jersey #	Name	Position	Years with the team	Alma mater	Achievements
#11	Donovan Isom	QB	2025–present	Texas Wesleyan University	
#1	Devin Phelps	WR	2023–present	Shepherd	
#90	Nicolas Rabi	DL	2024–present	Southern Illinois University	

Former import players

Name	Position	Years with the team	Alma mater	Achievements
Darrius Sample	QB	2024	University at Albany	
Jimmy Laughrea	QB	2022–2023	UC Davis	
Ponce de Leon	DB	2023	Shepherd	
Ryan Boehm	DL	2022–2023	Fresno State	Team MVP award (2022), Team Defensive Player of the Year award (2022)
Ridge Jones	WR	2019	New Mexico	
KeDarius Humphries	QB	2019	Murray State	
Jonah Hodges	RB	2018–2019	San Diego	
Anthony Wallace	LB	2019–2020	North Texas	
Jared Stegman	QB	2018	Queensland	
Mason Mills	QB	2015–2016	San Diego	ROY award (2015), All X-League Team member (2015)
Roman Wilson	WR	2015	Princeton	All X-League Team member (2015)
