= Rice Bowl =

Annual American football championship tournament held in Japan

- Japan Championship Rice Bowl presented by Prudential
- Stadium: Tokyo Dome
- Location: Tokyo, Japan
- Previous stadiums: National Stadium (1984–1990)
- Operated: 1948–present
- Conference tie-ins: X-League

Sponsors
- GA technologies Japan American Football Association

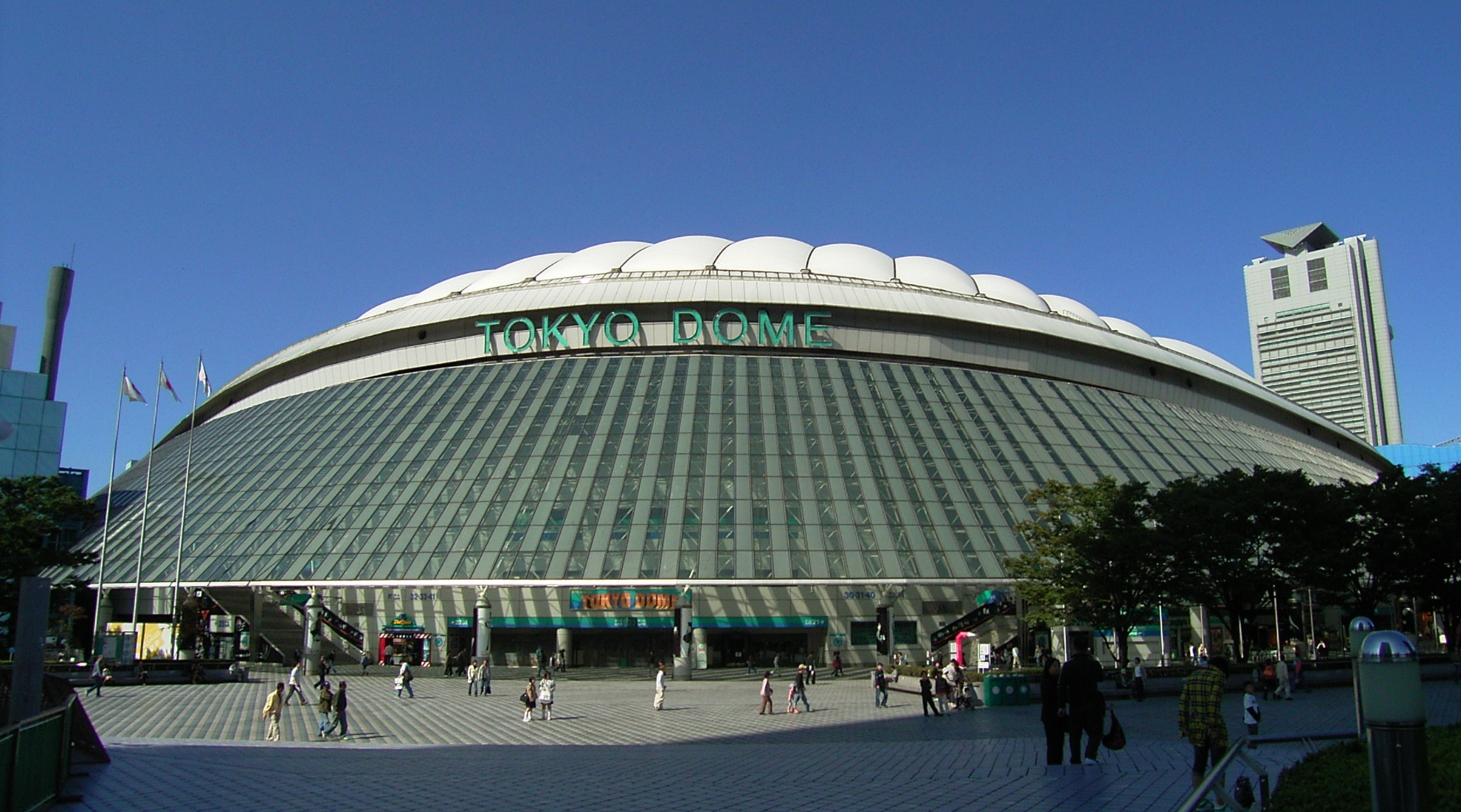
The Japan Championship Rice Bowl is currently held in the Tokyo Dome

The Japan Championship Rice Bowl is an annual American football national championship game held in Japan every January 3 that determines the champion of the X-League. The game was originally a collegiate all-star game until 1983. From 1984 to 2021, the game matched the champions of the Japan X Bowl with the college Koshien Bowl winners. However, after lopsided victories to the professional teams, discussions took place over whether this was a reasonable contest, and from 2022 the contest was changed so that it was between the two top professional teams. The game can draw over 30,000 spectators.

== Current champions ==
The current 2026 champions are the Panasonic Impulse. This is the first time the Impulse has won back-to-back Rice Bowl titles.

== All Star Era ==
Date	Game	Eastern Army	Score	Western Army	Stadium
January 17, 1948	1	Kanto University Selection	33-12	Kansai University Selection	Nile Kinnick Stadium
January 2, 1949	2	Kanto University Selection	52-0	Kansai University Selection	Nile Kinnick Stadium
January 4, 1950	3	Kanto University Selection	13-19	Kansai University Selection	Nile Kinnick Stadium
January 1, 1951	4	Kanto University Selection	27-6	Kansai University Selection	Nile Kinnick Stadium
January 5, 1952	5	Kanto University Selection	20-7	Kansai University Selection	Meiji Jingu Gaien Stadium
January 1, 1953	6	Kanto University Selection	43-0	Kansai University Selection	Meiji Jingu Gaien Stadium
January 1, 1954	7	Kanto University Selection	20-7	Kansai University Selection	Meiji Jingu Gaien Stadium
January 1, 1955	8	Kanto University Selection	20-0	Kansai University Selection	Meiji Jingu Gaien Stadium
January 1, 1956	9	Kanto University Selection	19-0	Kansai University Selection	Meiji Jingu Gaien Stadium
January 13, 1957	10	Kanto University Selection	13-21	Kansai University Selection	Korakuen Velodrome
January 1, 1958	11	Kanto University Selection	31-0	Kansai University Selection	Korakuen Stadium
January 1, 1959	12	Kanto University Selection	25-0	Kansai University Selection	National Stadium
January 1, 1960	13	Kanto University Selection	68-0	Kansai University Selection	National Stadium
January 1, 1961	14	Kanto University Selection	22-12	Kansai University Selection	National Stadium
January 1, 1962	15	Kanto University Selection	42-16	Kansai University Selection	Korakuen Velodrome
January 1, 1963	16	Kanto University Selection	40-8	Kansai University Selection	Korakuen Velodrome
January 1, 1964	17	Kanto University Selection	6-12	Kansai University Selection	Korakuen Velodrome
January 1, 1965	18	Kanto University Selection	44-6	Kansai University Selection	National Stadium
January 15, 1966	19	Kanto University Selection	14-20	Kansai University Selection	National Stadium
January 15, 1967	20	Kanto University Selection	30-34	Kansai University Selection	National Stadium
January 15, 1968	21	Kanto University Selection	8-18	Kansai University Selection	National Stadium
January 15, 1969	22	Kanto University Selection	16-12	Kansai University Selection	National Stadium
January 15, 1970	23	Kanto University Selection	8-14	Kansai University Selection	National Stadium
January 15, 1971	24	Kanto University Selection	6-28	Kansai University Selection	National Stadium
January 16, 1972	25	Kanto University Selection	30-20	Kansai University Selection	National Stadium
January 15, 1973	26	Kanto University Selection	26-28	Kansai University Selection	National Stadium
January 13, 1974	27	Kanto University Selection	0-47	Kansai University Selection	National Stadium
January 12, 1975	28	Kanto University Selection	31-7	Kansai University Selection	National Stadium
January 11, 1976	29	Kanto University Selection	10-14	Kansai University Selection	National Stadium
January 9, 1977	30	Kanto University Selection	7-21	Kansai University Selection	National Stadium
January 16, 1978	31	Kanto University Selection	26-14	Kansai University Selection	National Stadium
January 4, 1979	32	Kanto University Selection	21-0	Kansai University Selection	National Stadium
January 4, 1980	33	Kanto University Selection	42-14	Kansai University Selection	National Stadium
January 4, 1981	34	Kanto University Selection	35-15	Kansai University Selection	National Stadium
January 10, 1982	35	Kanto University Selection	20-9	Kansai University Selection	National Stadium
January 16, 1983	36	Kanto University Selection	37-34	Kansai University Selection	National Stadium

== National Championship Era ==
=== X-League vs College Era Results ===
Date	Game	College team	Score	X-League	Stadium	Attendance
January 3, 1984	37	Kyoto	29-28	Renown Rovers	National Stadium	—
January 3, 1985	38	Nihon	53-21	Renown Rovers	National Stadium	—
January 3, 1986	39	Kwansei Gakuin	42-45	Renown Rovers	National Stadium	—
January 3, 1987	40	Kyoto	35-34	Renown Rovers	National Stadium	—
January 3, 1988	41	Kyoto	42-8	Renown Rovers	National Stadium	—
January 3, 1989	42	Nihon	47-7	Renown Rovers	National Stadium	—
January 3, 1990	43	Nihon	42-14	Asahi Beer Silver Star	National Stadium	—
January 3, 1991	44	Nihon	35-13	Matsushita Electric Works Impulse	Tokyo Dome	—
January 3, 1992	45	Kwansei Gakuin	6-28	Onward Oaks	Tokyo Dome	—
January 3, 1993	46	Kyoto	20-29	Asahi Beer Silver Star	Tokyo Dome	—
January 3, 1994	47	Kwansei Gakuin	23-28	Asahi Beer Silver Star	Tokyo Dome	—
January 3, 1995	48	Ritsumeikan	14-16	Matsushita Electric Works Impulse	Tokyo Dome	—
January 3, 1996	49	Kyoto	35-21	Matsushita Electric Works Impulse	Tokyo Dome	—
January 3, 1997	50	Kyoto	16-19	Recruit Seagulls	Tokyo Dome	—
January 3, 1998	51	Hosei	0-39	Kashima Deers	Tokyo Dome	—
January 3, 1999	52	Ritsumeikan	16-30	Recruit Seagulls	Tokyo Dome	—
January 3, 2000	53	Kwansei Gakuin	17-33	Asahi Beer Silver Star	Tokyo Dome	—
January 3, 2001	54	Hosei	13-52	Asahi Soft Drink Challengers	Tokyo Dome	—
January 3, 2002	55	Kwansei Gakuin	30-27	Asahi Soft Drink Challengers	Tokyo Dome	—
January 3, 2003	56	Ritsumeikan	36-13	Obic Seagulls	Tokyo Dome	—
January 3, 2004	57	Ritsumeikan	28-16	Onward Oaks	Tokyo Dome	—
January 3, 2005	58	Ritsumeikan	7-26	Matsushita Electric Works Impulse	Tokyo Dome	28,000
January 3, 2006	59	Hosei	17-47	Obic Seagulls	Tokyo Dome	28,041
January 3, 2007	60	Hosei	29-30	Onward Skylarks	Tokyo Dome	32,598
January 3, 2008	61	Kwansei Gakuin	38-52	Panasonic Electric Works Impulse	Tokyo Dome	34,487
January 3, 2009	62	Ritsumeikan	17-13	Panasonic Electric Works Impulse	Tokyo Dome	34,655
January 3, 2010	63	Kansai	16-19	Kashima Deers	Tokyo Dome	35,742
January 3, 2011	64	Ritsumeikan	0-24	Obic Seagulls	Tokyo Dome	35,750
January 3, 2012	65	Kwansei Gakuin	28-38	Obic Seagulls	Tokyo Dome	25,059
January 3, 2013	66	Kwansei Gakuin	15-21	Obic Seagulls	Tokyo Dome	27,371
January 3, 2014	67	Kwansei Gakuin	16-34	Obic Seagulls	Tokyo Dome	29,564
January 3, 2015	68	Kwansei Gakuin	24-33	Fujitsu Frontiers	Tokyo Dome	30,361
January 3, 2016	69	Ritsumeikan	19-22	Panasonic Impulse	Tokyo Dome	31,345
January 3, 2017	70	Kwansei Gakuin	13-30	Fujitsu Frontiers	Tokyo Dome	33,521
January 3, 2018	71	Nihon	9-37	Fujitsu Frontiers	Tokyo Dome	34,500
January 3, 2019	72	Kwansei Gakuin	17-52	Fujitsu Frontiers	Tokyo Dome	33,242
January 3, 2020	73	Kwansei Gakuin	14-38	Fujitsu Frontiers	Tokyo Dome	31,345
January 3, 2021	74	Kwansei Gakuin	18-35	Obic Seagulls	Tokyo Dome	8,851

== X-League Championship Era ==
Date	Game	Team	Score	Team	Stadium	Attendance
January 3, 2022	75	Panasonic Impulse	18–24	Fujitsu Frontiers	Tokyo Dome	14,610
January 3, 2023	76	Panasonic Impulse	21–29	Fujitsu Frontiers	Tokyo Dome	16,796
January 3, 2024	77	Panasonic Impulse	10–16	Fujitsu Frontiers	Tokyo Dome	20,202
January 3, 2025	78	Fujitsu Frontiers	27–34	Panasonic Impulse	Tokyo Dome	17,694
January 3, 2026	79	Obic Seagulls	7–9	Panasonic Impulse	Tokyo Dome	20,214

== Records of teams ==
College Teams
Team	Times Participated	Wins	Losses
Kwansei Gakuin University Fighters	14	1	13
Ritsumeikan University Panthers	8	3	5
Kyoto University Gangsters	6	4	2
Nihon University Phoenix	5	4	1
Hosei University Orange	4	0	4
Kansai University Kaisers	1	0	1

X-League teams
Team	Times Participated	Wins	Losses
Panasonic Impulse	12	6	6
Obic Seagulls	10	8	2
Fujitsu Frontiers	9	8	1
Renown Rovers	6	1	5
Asahi Beer Silver Star	4	3	1
Onward Skylarks	3	2	1
Lixil Deers	2	2	0
Asahi Soft Drink Challengers	2	1	1
