= Meiji Griffins football =

Meiji University college football team in Tokyo, Japan

2015 Meiji Griffins football team
- First season: 1934
- Location: Tokyo, Japan
- Conference: Kantoh Collegiate American Football Association
- Division: Division 1 (Top 8)
- Colors: Gold and Navy
- Website: Meiji-griffins.net

The Meiji Griffins football program, established in 1934, represents Meiji University in college football. Nihon is a member of the Kantoh Collegiate American Football Association.
