= Panasonic Impulse =

American football team in Japan

General information
- Founded: 1974
- Headquartered: Kadoma, Osaka
- Colours: Panasonic Blue, Black and Yellow
- Website: http://panasonic.co.jp/es/go-go-impulse/

Personnel
- General manager: Tetsuro Shikata
- Head coach: Tadashi Araki

League / conference affiliations
- X-League; X1 Super Division

Championships
- Japan X Bowl titles: 9 (1990, 1994-95, 2004, 2007-08, 2015 & 2024-25)
- Division championships: 16 (1997, 2000, 2002-07, 2009-13, 2015-18)

The Panasonic Impulse is an American football team based in Kadoma, Osaka, Japan. The Impulse compete in the X-League, and are a member of the top tier X1 Super division along with Fujitsu Frontiers, Obic Seagulls, IBM Big Blue, Nojima Sagamihara Rise, Elecom Kobe Finies, Tokyo Gas Creators, and All Mitsubishi Lions. The team currently holds 8 Japan X Bowl championship titles along with 4 Rice Bowl Championships.

== Team history ==
- 1974 Team founded. Team known as the Matsushita Electric Works Impulse
- 1995 Won first Tokyo Super Bowl title. Also won first Rice Bowl National Championship.
- 2004 Team celebrates 30th anniversary of founding. Won 2nd Rice Bowl National Championship.
- 2008 Team name changed to Panasonic Electric Works Impulse. Won 3rd Rice Bowl National Championship.
- 2011 Team name changed to Panasonic Impulse.
- 2015 Won 7th Japan X Bowl title and 4th Rice Bowl National Championship.
- 2024 Won 8th Japan X Bowl title.
- 2025 Won 9th Japan X Bowl title.

== Seasons ==
X-League champions (1987–present)	Division champions	Final stage/semifinals berth	Wild card/second stage berth

Season	Division	Regular season				Postseason results	Awards	Head coaches
Season	Division	Finish	Wins	Losses	Ties	Postseason results	Awards	Head coaches
1997	West	1st	5	0	0	Won semi-finals match (Asahi Beer) 26-6; Lost Tokyo Super Bowl XI (Kashima) 12-48		Kawaguchi
1998	West	2nd	4	1	0	Lost Wild card match (Asahi Beer) 10-26		Kawaguchi
1999	West	3rd	3	2	0			Murakami
2000	West	1st	7	1	0	Won semi-finals match (Fujitsu); Lost Tokyo Super Bowl XIV (Asahi Soft Drinks) 18-20		Murakami
2001	West	1st	9	0	0	Won semi-finals match (Recruit) 10-7 OT; Lost Tokyo Super Bowl XV (at Asahi Soft Drinks) 7-14		Murakami
2002	West	1st	7	1	0	Lost semi-finals match (Fujitsu) 0-7		Murakami
2003	West	1st	8	1	0	Lost semi-finals match (Asahi Beer) 14-21		Murakami
2004	West	1st	10	0	0	Won semi-finals match (Obic) 10-7; Won Japan X Bowl XVIII (Asahi Beer) 15-6; Won 58th Rice Bowl National Championship game (at Ritsumeikan) 26-7		Murakami
2005	West	1st	8	2	0	Won semi-finals match (Kashima) 3-0; Lost Japan X Bowl XIX (at Obic) 16-25		Murakami
2006	West	1st	7	1	0	Lost semi-finals match (Kashima) 6-13		
2007	West	1st	9	0	0	Won semi-finals match (Obic) 29-26 OT; Won Japan X Bowl XXI (Fujitsu) 33-13; Won 61st Rice Bowl National Championship game (Kwansei Gakuin) 52-38		
2008	West	2nd	8	1	0	Won Wild card match (Obic) 49-7; Won semi-finals match (Onward) 44-17; Won Japan X Bowl XXII (Kashima) 28-14; Lost 62nd Rice Bowl National Championship game (Ritsumeikan) 13-17		
2009	West	1st	8	0	0	Won 2nd stage match (IBM) 49-7; Won 2nd stage match (Obic) 23-20; Lost final stage match (Kashima) 26-34		
2010	West	1st	9	0	0	Won 2nd stage match (Asahi Beer) 24-19; Won 2nd stage match (Fujitsu) 23-6; Won final stage match (IBM) 31-28; Lost Japan X Bowl XXIV (Obic) 16-20		
2011	West	1st	8	2	0	Won 2nd stage match (Asahi Beer) 28-10; Lost 2nd stage match (Fujitsu) 10-24		
2012	West	1st	7	3	0	Won 2nd stage match (at IBM) 34-17; Lost 2nd stage match (Nojima Sagamihara) 27-28	Ryohei Imanishi (MVP)	Nobuyoshi Araki
2013	West	1st	9	1	0	Won 2nd stage match (at IBM) 55-24; Lost 2nd stage match (Kashima) 45-47; Lost final stage match (at Fujitsu) 13-28	Tetsuo Takata (MVP); David Motu (ROY)	Nobuyoshi Araki
2014	West	2nd	7	1	0	Won 2nd stage match (at Asahi Beer) 65-3; Lost 2nd stage match (Fujitsu) 24-48		Nobuyoshi Araki
2015	West	1st	7	0	0	Won 2nd stage match (at Asahi Beer) 38-14; Won 2nd stage match (Nojima Sagamihara) 36-0; Won final stage match (Nojima Sagamihara) 45-17; Won Japan X Bowl XXIX (at Fujitsu) 24-21; Won 69th Rice Bowl National Championship game (Ritsumeikan) 22-19	Tetsuo Takata (MVP)	Nobuyoshi Araki
2016	West	1st	8	1	0	Won quarterfinals match (Asahi Beer) 21-14; Lost semi-finals match (at Obic) 6-9 OT		Nobuyoshi Araki
2017	West	1st	9	0	0	Won quarterfinals match (All Mitsubishi) 20-3; Lost semifinals match (IBM) 24-31	Benjamin Anderson (MVP)	Nobuyoshi Araki
2018	West	1st	8	1	0	Won quarterfinals match (Tokyo Gas) 45-0; Lost semifinals match (IBM) 17-24		Nobuyoshi Araki
2019	X1 Super	3rd	5	3	0	Won semifinals match (Obic) 24-14; Lost Japan X Bowl XXXIII (at Fujitsu) 26-28		Nobuyoshi Araki
2020	X1 Super	N/A	1	1	0	Lost semifinals tournament match (Obic) 35-34		Nobuyoshi Araki
2021	X1 Super	1st	6	0	0	Won semifinals match (IBM) 38-31; Lost 75th Rice Bowl Championship (Fujitsu) 18-24	Jaboree Williams (MVP)	Nobuyoshi Araki
2022	X1 Super Div. A	1st	7	0	0	Won quarterfinals match (Asahi Soft Drinks) 38-28; Won semifinals match (Obic) 30-10; Lost 76th Rice Bowl Championship (Fujitsu) 21-29	Jaylon Henderson (ROY)	Nobuyoshi Araki
2023	X1 Super Div. A	1st	7	0	1	Won quarterfinals match (Asahi Beer) 27-0; Won semifinals match (IBM) 47-23; Lost 77th Rice Bowl Championship (Fujitsu) 10-16		Nobuyoshi Araki
2024	X1 Super	2nd	9	0	0	Won quarterfinals match (Elecom Kobe) 24-3; Won semifinals match (Obic) 24-5; Won 78th Rice Bowl Championship (at Fujitsu) 34-27		Naoya Takayama
2025	X1 Super West	1st	8	0	0	Won quarterfinals match (IBM) 52-14; Won semifinals match (Fujitsu) 23-20; Won 79th Rice Bowl Championship (Obic) 9-7		Naoya Takayama
Total			208	22	1	(1997–2025, includes only regular season)		
Total			40	22	0	(1997–2025, includes only playoffs)		
Total			248	44	1	(1997–2025, includes both regular season and playoffs)		

== Import players ==
Current import players

Jersey #	Name	Position	Years with team	Alma mater	Achievements
#85	Caleb Phillips	TE	2024–present	University of Hawai'i	
#23	Joshua Cox	DB	2019–present	Central Michigan University	4x All X-League Team member (2020, 2023–2025)
#4	Jaboree Williams	LB	2020–present	Wake Forest University	3X All X-League Team member (2021, 2022, 2024); X1 Super MVP (2021)

Japanese-American players

Jersey #	Name	Position	Years with team	Alma mater	Achievements
#12	Tsubasa Brennan	WR	2021–present	Waseda University	
#10	Les Maruo	LB	2023–present	University of Texas at San Antonio	
#5	Victor Jamal Mitchell	RB	2019–present	University of Virginia's College at Wise	Japan National Team Selection (2020); 4x All X-League Team member (2020–2022, 2025)
#40	Moses Kaito Wiseman	LB	2019–present	Nihon University	Japan National Team Selection (2020); 3x All X-1 Super Team member (2023–2025)

Former import players

Name	Position	Years with the team	Alma mater	Achievements
Dax Raymond	TE	2023	Utah State University	
Shay Fields	WR	2020–2021, 2023	University of Colorado Boulder	
Jaylon Henderson	QB	2022	Boise State University	X-1 Super ROY award (2022)
Alfonso Onunwor	WR	2022	Idaho	4x All X-League Super team member (2019–2022)
Anthony Lawrence	QB	2019–2021	University of San Diego	All X-League Team member (2021)
Gabe Ahner	OL	2019	University of Louisville	
Aaron Ahner	DL	2017–2019	University of Louisville	
Daniel Wise	WR	2019	Colorado State Pueblo	
Carlton Jones	DE	2015–2019	Alabama State	All X-League Team member (2017)
Edmond Davis	C	2015–2018	Alabama State	4x All X-League Team member (2015–2018)
Benjamin Anderson	QB	2017–2018	UAPB	MVP award (2017)
Edward Burns	CB	2018	Elon	
Emory Polley	CB	2015–2017	Brown	2x All X-League Team member (2016–2017)
Ben Dupree	RB	2015–2016	The Citadel	All X-League Team member (2015)
Matthew Oh	LB	2014	Dartmouth	

== Notable coaches ==
Name	Role	Years with the team	Alma mater	Achievements
Tim Goins	Offensive coordinator & director of international football operations	2014-2015	UNLV	The first American coach in Panasonic Impulse history Recruited the Impulse’s first full roster of import players Japan National Champion (2015)
