= Asahi Soft Drink Challengers =

American football team in Japan

Sekisui Challengers

General information
- Founded: 1978
- Headquartered: Amagasaki, Hyogo
- Colors: Asahi Blue and White
- Mascot: Orange Bayarisu boy
- Website: http://www.challengers-net.com/

Personnel
- Owner: Katsuhiko Kishigami
- General manager: Shigeru Kaji
- Head coach: Shinichi Takeda

League / conference affiliations
- X-League; West Division

Championships
- Japan X Bowl titles:: 2 (2000, 2001)
- Division championships: 3 (1998-1999, 2008)

The Sekisui Challengers are an American football team located in Amagasaki, Hyogo, Japan. They are a member of the X-League.

== Team history ==
- 1978 Team founded as a practice team for the Momoyama Gakuin University's football team. Team was nicknamed the "Silver Tigers" due to a majority of the team being fans of the Hanshin Tigers professional baseball team.
- 1979 Joined the X-League X2 division.
- 1985 Promoted from X2 to X1.
- 1989 Team name changed from Silver Tigers to Red Bears.
- 1993 Sponsorship agreement with Asahi Soft Drinks. Team name changed from Red Bears to Wild Jo. Finished the season 5th in the division. Lost X2-X1 replacement game. Demoted to X2 for the following season.
- 1996 Team promoted from X2 to X1.
- 1998 Team name changed to Challengers. Advanced to the Final6 Semifinals.
- 2000 Won first Tokyo Super Bowl and Rice Bowl Championships.
- 2001 Won second Tokyo Super Bowl championship. Lost to Kwansei Gakuin 30-27 in the Rice Bowl.
- 2007 Won West division title. Lost to Kashima in the Final6 Semi-finals 7-24.
- 2024 Sponsorship with Asahi Soft Drinks ended. Team reaches sponsorship agreement with Sekuisui Chemical Co., LTD. Team renamed "Sekisui Challengers".

== Seasons ==
X-League champions (1987–present)	Division champions	Final Stage/Semifinals Berth	Wild Card /2nd Stage Berth

Season	Division	Regular Season				Postseason results	Awards	Head coaches
Season	Division	Finish	Wins	Losses	Ties	Postseason results	Awards	Head coaches
1997	West	6th	1	4	0			Hiroshi Yamazaki
1998	West	1st	5	0	0	Lost semi-finals match (at Recruit) 16-21		Satoshi Fujita
1999	West	1st	5	0	0	Lost semi-finals match (Asahi Beer) 15-20		Satoshi Fujita
2000	West	2nd	5	1	0	Won Wild card match (Asahi Beer); Won Semi-finals match (at Recruit); Won Tokyo Super Bowl XIV (at Matsushita Electric Works) 20-18; Won 54th Rice Bowl National Championship game (Hosei) 52-13		Satoshi Fujita
2001	West	2nd	4	3	0	Won Wild card match (Asahi Beer) 24-6; Won Semi-finals match (at Kashima) 21-13; Won Tokyo Super Bowl XV (Matsushita Denko) 14-7; Lost 55th Rice Bowl National Championship game (at Kwansei Gakuin) 27-30		Satoshi Fujita
2002	West	2nd	4	2	0	Won Wild card match (Kashima) 28-10; Lost semi-finals match (at Obic) 0-30		Takeshi Yamakawa
2003	West	2nd	5	1	0	Won Wild card match (Obic) 16-9; Lost semi-finals match (at Onward) 17-41		Takeshi Yamakawa
2004	West	2nd	4	2	0	Lost Wild card match (Asahi Beer) 7-10		Masato Takahashi
2005	West	2nd	5	1	0	Lost Wild card match (Asahi Beer) 19-22		Masato Takahashi
2006	West	3rd	4	2	0			Masato Takahashi
2007	West	2nd	5	2	0	Lost Wild card match (Onward) 0-20		Masato Takahashi
2008	West	1st	7	1	0	Lost semi-finals match (Kashima) 7-24		Yoshito Fujimoto
2009	West	2nd	6	2	0	Won 2nd stage match (Nihon Unisys) 55-13; Lost 2nd stage match (Fujitsu) 21-43		Yoshito Fujimoto
2010	West	2nd	6	1	0	Won 2nd stage match (Meiji Yasuda) 29-24; Lost 2nd stage match (Kashima) 23-38		Yoshito Fujimoto
2011	West	2nd	5	2	1	Won 2nd stage match (All Mitsubishi) 24-3; Lost 2nd stage match (Obic) 13-20		Yoshito Fujimoto
2012	West	2nd	5	2	0	Lost 2nd stage match (at Asahi Beer) 20-26 OT; Lost 2nd stage match (at Obic) 12-29		Yabe
2013	West	2nd	5	2	0	Lost 2nd stage match (Asahi Beer) 10-34; Lost 2nd stage match (at Obic) 17-44		Yabe
2014	West	3rd	5	3	0	Lost 2nd stage match (Lixil) 7-23; Lost 2nd stage match (at IBM) 10-37		Tatsuhide Fukuda
2015	West	2nd	6	2	0	Lost 2nd stage match (at Obic) 9-52; Lost 2nd stage match (IBM) 20-37		Naoto Matsumoto
2016	West	3rd	3	6	0	Won Wildcard match (All Mitsubishi) 20-6; Lost quarterfinals match (at Fujitsu) 6-42; Won Super9/Battle9 classification match (AS ONE) 39-7		Naoto Matsumoto
2017	West	3rd	4	5	0	Won Super9/Battle9 classification match (AS ONE) 27-7		Takashi Kubo
2018	West	3rd	4	5	0			Takashi Kubo
2019	X1 Area West	1st	9	0	0	Lost X1 Area Final (at Asahi Beer) 31-34	Garret Safron (X1 Area MVP & ROY)	Takashi Kubo
2020	X1 Area West	1st	3	0	0			Takashi Kubo
2021	X1 Area West	1st	5	1	0			Takashi Masahige
2022	X1 Super Div. B	4th	3	4	0	Lost quarterfinals match (at Panasonic) 28-38		Takashi Masahige
2023	X1 Super Div. A	5th	3	4	0			Takashi Masahige
2024	X1 Super	4th	5	3	0	Won Quarterfinals Match (Tokyo Gas) 21-0; Lost Semifinals Match (at Fujitsu) 21-52		Takashi Masahige
2025	X1 Super West	2nd	6	3	0	Lost Quarterfinals Match (Tokyo Gas) 13-16		Shinichi Takeda
Total			132	63	1	(1997–2025, includes only regular season)		
Total			16	25	0	(1997–2025, includes only playoffs)		
Total			148	88	1	(1997–2025, includes both regular season and playoffs)		

== Head coaches ==
Coach	Years	Record
Hiroshi Yamazaki	1997	1–4 (.200)
Satoshi Fujita	1998–2001	26–7 (.813)
Takeshi Yamakawa	2002–2003	15–5 (.750)
Masato Takahashi	2004–2007	18–10 (.630)
Yoshito Fujimoto	2008–2011	27–10–1 (.730)
Yabe	2012–2013	10–8 (.556)
Tatsuhide Fukuda	2014	5–5 (.500)
Naoto Matsumoto	2015–2016	11–11 (.500)
Takashi Kubo	2017–present	21–11 (.656)

== Current import players ==
Jersey #	Name	Position	Years with the team	Alma mater	Achievements
#0	Tre'Vaughn Craig	DB	2023–present	Central Oklahoma	2x All X1 Super Team member (2024, 2025)
#8	Garrett Safron	QB	2019–present	Sacramento State	X-League Area MVP & ROY (2019); All X1 Area Team member (2019); All X1 Super Team member (2024)
#1	Boogie Knight	WR	2023–present	Louisiana-Monroe	X1 Super ROY (2023); 3x All X1 Super Team member (2023–2025); X1 Super MVP (2025)

Former Import players

Name	Position	Years with the team	Alma mater	Achievements
Robert Earl Johnson II	WR	2018–2022	Mississippi State	All X-League Area Team member (2019)
Davion Washington	DB	2022	Wingate	
Robbie Wallace	LB	2022	Wingate	
Brison Burris	DB	2019–2021	Miami University	All X-League Area Team member (2019)
Michael R. Taylor Jr.	LB	2019–2021	Florida	All X-League Area Team member (2019)
Clint Floyd	LB	2017–2018	Arizona State	
Alex Niznak	QB	2017–2018	Central Michigan	
Brandon Berry	LB	2018	Buffalo	
Donnie King	WR	2015–2017	Hawai'i	
Makani Kema-Kaleiwahea	DL	2017	Hawaii	
Darwin Rogers	TE	2016	Arizona State	
Paul Porras	SS	2016	Rice	
Albert Griffin	DE	2015	Lindenwood	
Kaniela Tuipulotu	DT	2014	Hawaii	
Siasau Matagiese	DT	2014	Hawaii	
