= IBM Big Blue (X-League) =

American football team in Chiba Prefecture, Japan

General information
- Founded: 1976
- Headquartered: Makuhari, Chiba, Japan
- Colours: Blue, black, grey, and white
- Website: http://www.bigblue-football.com/

Personnel
- General manager: Mike Phair
- Head coach: Mike Phair

League / conference affiliations
- X-League; X1 Super Division

Championships
- Division championships: 2 (2001 and 2015)

The IBM Big Blue are an American football team located in the Tsukuba, Ibaraki. They are a member of the X-League.

== Team history ==
- 1976 Team founded as the IBM Thinkers.
- 1977 Joined the X-League.
- 1989 Team name changed to IBM Big Blue.
- 1996 Won X2 Central Divisional title. Defeated Penta-Ocean Construction Co. 28-27 in X2-X1 replacement game.
- 1997 Promoted from X2 to X1.
- 2010 Advanced to Final stage. Lost to Panasonic Impulse 28-31.
- 2014 Defeated the Lixil Deers in the Final stage to advance to the Japan X Bowl. Lost to the Fujitsu Frontiers 10-44.
- 2016 Celebrated 40th anniversary of team founding.

== Seasons ==
X-League champions (1987–present)	Division champions	Final Stage/Semifinals Berth	Wild Card /2nd Stage Berth

Season	League	Division	Regular Season				Postseason results	Awards	Head coaches
Season	League	Division	Finish	Wins	Losses	Ties	Postseason results	Awards	Head coaches
1997	X2	Central	3rd	3	2	0			
1998	X2	Central	3rd	3	2	0			
1999	X2	Central	3rd	3	2	0			
2000	X2	Central	2nd	4	0	1			
2001	X2	Central	1st	5	0	0			
2002	X1	East	5th	1	4	1			Matoba
2003	X1	East	6th	0	5	0			David Stant
2004	X1	East	4th	2	3	1			David Stant
2005	X1	Central	3rd	4	1	0			David Stant
2006	X1	East	3rd	4	2	0			David Stant
2007	X1	Central	3rd	5	2	0			
2008	X1	Central	3rd	5	2	0			
2009	X1	East	3rd	4	3	0	Lost 2nd match (Panasonic Denko) 7-49; Lost 2nd stage match (Obic) 14-44		Shinzo Yamada
2010	X1	East	2nd	6	2	0	Won 2nd match (Suita) 42-10; Lost 2nd stage match (Obic) 27-55; Lost final stage match (Panasonic) 28-31		Shinzo Yamada
2011	X1	Central	4th	3	4	0	Won 2nd stage relegation match (Fuji Xerox) 70-14; Won 2nd stage relegation match (Meiji Yasuda) 38-8		Shinzo Yamada
2012	X1	Central	3rd	4	3	0	Lost 2nd stage match (Panasonic Impulse) 17-34; Won 2nd stage match (Nojima Sagamihara) 48-17	Kevin Craft (ROY)	Shinzo Yamada
2013	X1	Central	3rd	4	3	0	Lost 2nd stage match (Panasonic) 24-55; Won 2nd stage match (Kashima) 56-35		Shinzo Yamada
2014	X1	Central	2nd	6	2	0	Won 2nd stage match (at Asahi Soft Drinks) 37-10; Won 2nd stage match (at Lixil) 38-10; Won Final stage match (Lixil) 69-54; Lost Japan X Bowl XXVIII (at Fujitsu) 10-44		Shinzo Yamada
2015	X1	East	1st	4	3	0	Lost 2nd stage match (at Obic) 26-34; Won 2nd stage match (at Asahi Soft Drinks) 37-20		Shinzo Yamada
2016	X1	East	2nd	6	3	0	Won Quarterfinals match (at LIXIL) 37-16; Lost semi-finals match (at Fujitsu) 26-28		Shinzo Yamada
2017	X1	Central	2nd	7	3	0	Won Quarterfinals match (at LIXIL) 51-31; Won Semifinals match (at Panasonic) 31-24; Lost Japan X Bowl XXXI (at Fujitsu) 23-63		Shinzo Yamada
2018	X1	East	2nd	8	2	0	Won Quarterfinals match (at Elecom Kobe) 34-23; Won Semifinals match (at Panasonic) 24-17; Lost Japan X Bowl XXXII (at Fujitsu) 18-35		Kevin Craft
2019	X1	Super	5th	6	5	0			Kevin Craft
2020	X1	Super	7th	0	3	0			Kevin Craft
2021	X1	Super	4th	3	3	1	Lost semifinals match (Panasonic) 31-38		Kevin Craft
2022	X1 Super	Div. A	2nd	5	2	0	Lost quarterfinals match (Elecom Kobe) 25-35		Kevin Craft
2023	X1 Super	Div. B	2nd	5	2	0	Won quarterfinals match (Nojima Sagamihara) 24-21; Lost Semi-finals match (at Panasonic) 23-47		Kevin Craft
2024	X1 Super		8th	3	4	1	Lost quarterfinals match (at Fujitsu) 14-49		Mike Phair
2025	X1 Super	East	3rd	2	6	0	Lost quarterfinals match (at Panasonic) 14-52		Mike Phair
Total				115	78	4	(1997–2025, includes only regular season)		
Total				15	16	0	(1997–2025, includes only playoffs)		
Total				130	94	4	(1997–2025, includes both regular season and playoffs)		

== Current import players ==
Jersey #	Name	Position	Years with the team	Alma mater	Achievements
#5	Tommy Auger	TE	2025–present	St. John's (MN)	
#92	Thomas Schaffer	DE	2025–present	Stanford	

Former import players

Name	Position	Years with the team	Alma mater	Achievements
Charlie Darape	DB	2024	Vanderbilt	
Logan Stewart	DB	2023–2024	Colorado State	
Sinodinos Dimitrios	QB	2024	McGill	
Victor Viramontes	QB	2023	UNLV	
Christian Onyechi	DE	2023	Colorado State	
John Stanton	TE	2012–2023	St. John's (MN)	5x All X-League Team member (2013, 2014, 2016, 2017, 2021)
James Brooks	DE	2014–2022	Arizona State	4x All X-League Team member (2014–2017)
Michael R. Taylor Jr.	LB	2022	Florida	All X-League Area Team member (2019)
Jhurell Pressley	RB	2022	New Mexico	All X1 Super Team member (2022)
Jason Smith	WR	2021	Auburn	
Herbert Gamboa	LB	2020–2021	Montana	All X1 Super Team member (2020)
Kevin Craft	QB	2012–2020	UCLA	ROY award (2012), 2x All X-League Team member (2012, 2013)
Charles Tuaau	DT	2017–2019	Texas A&M–Commerce	
Rykeem Yates	DT	2016	Nevada	All X-League Team member (2016)
Demetrius Eaton	DE	2015	Northwestern	
Tuika Tufaga	DT	2014	Hawai'i	
Jabali Miller	CB	2012–2013	San José State	
Albert Griffin	S	2010–2013	Lindenwood	
Rocky Pouta-Alo	FS/RB	2007–2008	Indiana State	
Ian Sample	WR	2008	Hawai'i	
Jon Giesel	OG	2005	California	All X-League Team member (2005)

== See also ==
IBM Big Blue (rugby union)
