= Tainai Deers =

General information
- Founded: 1989
- Headquartered: Chofu, Tokyo, Japan
- Colours: Burgundy and white
- Mascot: Deer-kun
- Website: http://www.deers.jp

Personnel
- Owner: Yoshiaki Fujimori
- Head coach: Motohide Takano

League / conference affiliations
- X-League; Central Division

Championships
- Japan X Bowl titles: 2 (1997 and 2009)
- Division championships: 14 (1997–99, 2001, 2003–05, 2007–12, 2014)

The Tainai Deers is an American football team located in Chofu, Tokyo, Japan. They are a member of the X-League.

== Team history ==
- 1989 Team founded by the Kajima Business group. Team known as the Kajima Deers
- 1992 Promoted from X2 to X1.
- 1997 Won first Tokyo Super Bowl title.
- 2009 Won 2nd Japan X Bowl title and 1st Rice Bowl National Championship
- 2014 Kajima Group ends team sponsorship. Lixil Group offers new sponsorship. Team renamed the LIXIL Deers.
- 2021 Lixil Group end sponsorship. Team renamed Deers Football Club.
- 2022 Team renamed Tainai Deers.

== Seasons ==
X-League champions (1987–present)	Division champions	Final Stage/Semifinals Berth	Wild Card /2nd Stage Berth

Season	Division	Regular Season				Postseason results	Awards	Head coaches
Season	Division	Finish	Wins	Losses	Ties	Postseason results	Awards	Head coaches
1989	East	1st	4	0	0			Makoto Kaneji
1990	East	1st	8	0	0			Makoto Kaneji
1991	East	1st	10	2	0	Won X2-X1 promotion match (Silver Ox) 24–16		Makoto Kaneji
1992	East	3rd	6	4	0			Makoto Kaneji
1993	East	4th	7	6	0			Shigeru Saito
1994	East	1st	6	2	1	Lost semifinals match (Onward) 6–34		Shigeru Saito
1995	East	3rd	8	3	0			Shigeru Saito
1996	Central	3rd	6	2	0			Motohide Takano
1997	Central	1st	10	1	0	Won Semifinals match (Onward) 23–20 2OT; Won Tokyo Super Bowl XI (Matsushita Electric Works) 48–12; Won 51st Rice Bowl National Championship game (Hosei) 39–0		Motohide Takano
1998	Central	1st	8	2	0	Lost semifinals match (Asahi Beer) 13–38		Motohide Takano
1999	Central	1st	9	0	0	Won Semifinals match (Recruit) 20–13; Lost Tokyo Super Bowl XIII (Asahi Beer) 16–18		Motohide Takano
2000	Central	3rd	6	3	0			Kiyoyuki Mori
2001	Central	1st	9	1	0	Lost semi-finals match (Asahi Soft Drinks) 13–21		Kiyoyuki Mori
2002	East	2nd	9	3	0	Lost Wildcard match (Asahi Soft Drinks) 10–28		Kiyoyuki Mori
2003	Central	1st	7	1	0	Lost Wild Card match (Asahi Beer) 3–7		Kiyoyuki Mori
2004	East	1st	10	0	0	Lost Wild Card match (Obic) 3–10		Kiyoyuki Mori
2005	Central	1st	9	2	0	Won Wild card match (Onward) 27–6; Lost semi-finals match (Matsushita Denko) 0–3		Kiyoyuki Mori
2006	East	2nd	5	3	0	Won Wild Card match (Asahi Beer) 14–6; Won Semi-finals match (Matsushita Denko) 13–6; Lost Japan X Bowl XX (Onward) 21–24		Kiyoyuki Mori
2007	Central	1st	6	2	0	Lost Wild Card match (Obic) 13–19 OT		Kiyoyuki Mori
2008	Central	1st	10	0	0	Won Wild Card match (Fujitsu) 21–19; Won Semi-finals match (Asahi Soft Drinks) 24–7; Lost Japan X Bowl XXII (Panasonic Denko) 14–28		Kiyoyuki Mori
2009	Central	1st	8	1	0	Won 2nd stage match (Suita) 32–19; Won 2nd stage match (Asahi Beer) 24–14; Won Final stage match (Panasonic) 34–26; Won Japan X Bowl XXIII (Fujitsu) 21–14; Won 63rd Rice Bowl National Championship game (Kansai) 19–16		Kiyoyuki Mori
2010	East	1st	7	1	0	Won 2nd stage match (Meiji Yasuda) 52–13; Lost 2nd stage match (Asahi Soft Drinks) 38–23; Lost final stage match (Obic) 21–28 OT		Kiyoyuki Mori
2011	East	1st	7	0	0	Won 2nd stage match (As One) 55–7; Lost 2nd stage match (Nojima Sagamihara) 20–27 OT; Lost final stage match (Obic) 20–45		Kiyoyuki Mori
2012	East	1st	7	1	0	Won 2nd stage match (at As One) 40–6; Won 2nd stage match (Fujitsu) 27–15; Won Final stage match (Fujitsu) 24–14; Lost Japan X Bowl XXVI (at Obic) 24–27	Yasuhiro Maruta (MVP); Kohei Arai (ROY)	Kiyoyuki Mori
2013	East	2nd	7	1	0	Lost 2nd stage match (IBM) 35–56; Won 2nd stage match (at Panasonic) 47–45; Lost final stage match (at Obic) 12–21		Kiyoyuki Mori
2014	Central	1st	7	1	0	Won 2nd stage match (at Asahi Soft Drinks) 23–7; Lost 2nd stage match (IBM) 10–38; Lost final stage match (at IBM) 54–69		Kiyoyuki Mori
2015	Central	2nd	5	2	0	Won 2nd stage match (at Elecom Kobe) 35–8; Lost 2nd stage match (at Fujitsu) 24–34		Kiyoyuki Mori
2016	Central	2nd	7	3	0	Lost quarterfinals match (IBM) 16–37		Kiyoyuki Mori
2017	East	2nd	6	3	0	Lost quarterfinals match (IBM) 31–51		Tominaga Hajime
2018	Central	3rd	4	5	0	Lost Wildcard match (at Tokyo Gas) 7–14 OT		Tominaga Hajime
2019	X1 Area Central	1st	6	3	0			Motohide Takano
2020	X1 Area Central	N/A	3	0	0			Motohide Takano
2021	X1 Area Central	1st	4	2	0			Motohide Takano
2022	X1 Super Div. A	5th	3	5	0			Motohide Takano
2023	X1 Super Div. B	6th	1	5	1	Lost X1 Super Ranking match (Asahi Soft Drinks) 8–14; Lost X1 Super/X1 Area replacement match (All Mitsubishi) 17–31		Yasushi Nakagawa
2024	X1 Area Central	1st	9	0	0	Lost X1 Super/X1 Area replacement match (FujiFilm Ebina) 17–20		Takashi Kubo
2025	X1 Area Central	1st	9	0	0	Won X1 Area East Japan Championship (Dentsu) 21–16		Takashi Kubo
Total			249	68	2	(1989–2025, includes only regular season)		
Total			24	27	0	(1989–2025, includes only playoffs)		
Total			273	95	2	(1989–2025, includes both regular season and playoffs)		

== Head coaches ==
Coach	Years	Record
Makoto Kaneji	1989–1992	29–6 (.829)
Shigeru Saito	1993–1995	21–12–1 (.618)
Motohide Takano	1996–1999, 2019–22	46–10 (.821)
Kiyoyuki Mori	2000–2016	154–54 (.760)
Tominaga Hajime	2017–18	10–10 (.500)
Yasushi Nakagawa	2023	1–7–1 (.125)
Takashi Kubo	2024–present	19–1 (.950)

== Current Import Players ==
Jersey #	Name	Position	Years with the team	Alma mater	Achievements
#21	Paul Morant	DB	2025–present	Old Dominion University	X1 Area ROY (2025)

Former Import players

Name	Position	Years with the team	Alma mater	Achievements
Michael Hawkins	CB	2022–24	University of San Diego	
Ian Park	LT	2019–2023	Northwestern University	2x All X-League Area Team member (2019 & 2020)
Joseph Marton	DL	2022	SGS College	
Joe Mathis	OLB	2020	Washington	2x All X-League Team member (2018 & 2020)
Dakota Torres	TE	2019	University of Hawaii at Manoa	
Max Look	CB	2019	Pacific University	All X-League Area Team member (2019)
Fred Wyatt	DT	2019	Northwestern University	
Derrick Bryant	LB	2018	University of Indianapolis	
