= Obic Seagulls =

American football team in Japan

General information
- Founded: 1983
- Headquartered: Narashino, Japan
- Colours: Navy, gold, aqua green, and white
- Mascot: Seagull-kun
- Website: http://www.seagulls.jp

Personnel
- Head coach: Masakatsu Tsukada

League / conference affiliations
- X-League; X1 Super Division

Championships
- Japan X Bowl titles: 9 (1996, 1998, 2002, 2005, 2010-13, 2020)
- Division championships: 10 (1988, 1996, 2000-2002, 2005, 2010-2013)

The Obic Seagulls are an American football team located in the Narashino, Chiba, Japan. They are a member of the X-League. The Obic Seagulls have won over 17 championships during their team history (8 Rice Bowl championships and 9 Japan X Bowl championships) the most of any American football team in Japan.

== Team history ==
- 1983 Team founded as the "Recruit Seagulls"
- 1989 Promoted from X2 to X1
- 1995 Won first Division Title
- 1996 Won first league and national title.
- 1998 Won second league and national title.
- 1999 Following an economic downturn, the team transitioned from a corporate team under Recruit Co., Ltd., to a club team.
- 2002 Recruit withdraws team sponsorship. Team became a self-supporting club team under the name "Seagulls".
- 2003 Obic Co., Ltd., becomes new team sponsor. Team name changed to Obic Seagulls.
- 2005 Won third League and national title.
- 2012 Went on record as being the 1st club team in Japan (Among currently registered X-League teams) to play in an international exhibition game (Germany/Dresden Monarchs).
- 2013 Played in an international exhibition game in Dusseldorf, Germany vs. the Dusseldorf Panthers. Became the first Japanese team to win 4 consecutive national championships dating back to 2010.
- 2014 Played in a sister cities international exhibition game in Tuscaloosa, Alabama, U.S.A. vs. the APDFL(Amateur to Professional Developmental Football League) Blazers.

== Seasons ==
X-League champions (1987–present)	Division champions	Final Stage/Semifinals Berth	Wild Card /2nd Stage Berth

Season	Division	Regular Season				Postseason results	Awards	Head coaches
Season	Division	Finish	Wins	Losses	Ties	Postseason results	Awards	Head coaches
1988	East	1st	5	0	0			Eiichi Nakata
1989	East	2nd	3	1	0			Mitsuru Taisha
1990	East	5th	1	3	1			Mitsuru Taisha
1991	East	5th	1	3	1			Mitsuru Taisha
1992	East	2nd	3	1	1			Mitsuru Taisha
1993	East	3rd	3	2	0			David Stant
1994	East	2nd	4	1	0			David Stant
1995	East	1st	5	0	0	Won semi-finals match (Asahi Beer) 33-27; Lost Tokyo Super Bowl XIX (Matsushita Denko) 20-54		David Stant
1996	Central	1st	4	2	0	Won Wild Card match (Sanwa Bank) 27-0; Won semi-finals match (Matsushita Denko) 22-13; Won Tokyo Super Bowl XX (Onward) 30-10; Won 50th Rice Bowl National Championship game (Kyoto) 19-16		David Stant
1997	Central	3rd	5	2	0			David Stant
1998	Central	2nd	4	2	0	Won Wild Card match (Nissan Prince Tokyo) 56-21; Won semi-finals match (Asahi Soft Drinks) 21-16; Won Tokyo Super Bowl XXII (Asahi Beer) 45-24; Won 52nd Rice Bowl National Championship game (Ritsumeikan) 30-16		David Stant
1999	Central	2nd	4	2	0	Won Wild Card match (Mycal) 37-7; Lost semi-finals match (Kashima) 13-20		David Stant
2000	Central	1st	6	0	0	Lost semi-finals match(Asahi Soft Drinks) 15-23		Makoto Ohashi
2001	Central	1st	5	0	0	Won Wild Card match (Fujits) 24-14; Lost semi-finals match(at Matsushita Denko) 7-10 OT		Makoto Ohashi
2002	Central	1st	5	1	0	Won semi-finals match (Asahi Soft Drinks) 30-0; Won Tokyo Super Bowl XVI (Fujitsu) 14-7; Lost 56th Rice Bowl National Championship game (at Ritsumeikan) 13-36		Makoto Ohashi
2003	Central	2nd	4	2	0	Lost Wild Card match (Asahi Soft Drinks) 9-16		Makoto Ohashi
2004	East	2nd	4	2	0	Won Wild Card match (Kashima) 10-3; Lost semifinals match (Matsushita Denko) 7-10		Makoto Ohashi
2005	East	1st	6	0	0	Won Semifinals match (Asahi Beer) 13-7; Won Japan X Bowl XIX (Matsushita Denko) 25-16; Won 59th Rice Bowl National Championship game (Hosei) 47-17	Kevin Jackson (MVP)	Makoto Ohashi
2006	East	1st	4	1	0	Won Wild Card match (Naigai Denki) 74-13; Lost semifinals match (Onward) 13-17		Makoto Ohashi
2007	East	2nd	6	1	0	Won Wild Card match (Kashima) 19-13; Lost semifinals match (Matsushita Denko) 26-29		Makoto Ohashi
2008	Central	2nd	6	2	0	Lost Wild Card match (Panasonic) 14-20		Makoto Ohashi
2009	East	2nd	7	2	0	Won 2nd stage match (IBM) 21-7; Lost 2nd Stage match (Panasonic) 20-23		Makoto Ohashi
2010	Central	1st	8	1	0	Won 2nd stage match (Suita) 56-2; Won 2nd stage match (IBM) 55-27; Won Final stage match (Kajima) 28-21; Won Japan X Bowl XXIV (Panasonic) 20-16; Won 64th Rice Bowl National Championship game (at Ritsumeikan) 24-0		Makoto Ohashi
2011	Central	1st	7	0	0	Won 2nd stage match (All Mitsubishi) 49-0; Won 2nd stage match (Asahi Soft Drinks) 20-13; Won Final stage match (Kajima 45-20; Won Japan X Bowl XXV (Fujitsu) 24-17; Won 65th Rice Bowl National Championship game (Kwansei Gakuin) 38-0		Makoto Ohashi
2012	Central	1st	9	0	0	Won 2nd stage match (Asahi Beer) 69-7; Won 2nd stage match (Asahi Soft Drinks) 29-12; Won Final stage match (Nojima) 24-10; Won Japan X Bowl XXVI (Kajima) 27-24; Won 66th Rice Bowl National Championship game (at Kwansei Gakuin) 21-15	Noriaki Kinoshita (MVP)	Makoto Ohashi
2013	Central	1st	6	1	0	Won 2nd stage match (Asahi Beer) 21-7; Won 2nd stage match (Asahi Soft Drinks) 34-10; Won Final stage match (Kajima 21-12; Won Japan X Bowl XXVII (Fujitsu) 24-16; Won 67th Rice Bowl National Championship game (Kwansei Gakuin) 34-16	Noriaki Kinoshita (MVP); Kealakai Maiava (ROY)	Makoto Ohashi
2014	Central	2nd	7	2	0	Won 2nd stage match (Nojima) 44-21; Won 2nd stage match (at Elecom) 45-0; Lost final stage match (at Fujitsu) 17-27		Makoto Ohashi
2015	East	3rd	5	2	0	Won 2nd stage match (IBM) 34-26; Won 2nd stage match (Asahi Soft Drinks) 52-9; Lost final stage match (at Fujitsu) 6-27		Makoto Ohashi
2016	Central	1st	8	1	0	Won Quarterfinals match (Elecom Kobe) 35-0; Won Semifinals match (Panasonic) 9-6 OT; Loss Japan X Bowl XXX (at Fujitsu) 3-16		Naoki Kosho
2017	Central	3rd	7	3	0	Won Quarterfinals match (at Nojima Sagamihara) 41-22; Lost semifinals match (at Fujitsu) 0-7	Taku Li (ROY)	Naoki Kosho
2018	Central	2nd	8	2	0	Won Quarterfinals match (at Nojima Sagamihara) 42-25; Lost semifinals match (at Fujitsu) 10-13		Naoki Kosho
2019	X1 Super	2nd	10	1	0	Lost semifinals match (at Panasonic) 14-24		Naoki Kosho
2020	X1 Super		2	0	0	Won Japan X Bowl XXXIV (Fujitsu) 13-7; Won 74th Rice Bowl National Championship (Kwansei Gakuin U.) 35-18		Makoto Ohashi
2021	X1 Super	3rd	5	2	0	Lost semifinals Match (at Fujitsu) 10-17		Makoto Ohashi
2022	X1 Super Div. B	2nd	3	1	1	Won Quarterfinals Match (Nojima Sagamihara) 21-9; Lost Semifinals Match (at Panasonic) 10-30		Makoto Ohashi
2023	X1 Super Div. B	2nd	7	1	0	Won Quarterfinals Match (Elecom Kobe) 17-7; Lost Semifinals Match (at Fujitsu) 17-24		Hiroshi Ono
2024	X1 Super	3rd	8	1	0	Won Quarterfinals Match (Nojima Sagamihara) 20-14; Lost Semifinals Match (at Panasonic) 5-24		Hiroshi Ono
2025	X1 Super East	1st	9	0	0	Won Quarterfinals Match (Elecom Kobe) 10-7; Won Semifinals Match (Tokyo Gas) 35-9; Lost 79th Rice Bowl Championship (at Panasonic) 7-9	Pierce Holley (X1 Super ROY)	Masakatsu Tsukada
Total			199	46	4	(1988–2025, includes only regular season)		
Total			55	21	0	(1988–2025, includes only playoffs)		
Total			254	67	4	(1988–2025, includes both regular season and playoffs)		

== Head coaches ==
Coach	Years	Record
Eiichi Nakata	1988	5-0 (1.000)
Mitsuru Taisha	1989-1992	8-8-3 (.500)
David Stant	1993-1999	39-13 (.750)
Makoto Ohashi	2000-2015	129-28 (.822)
Naoki Kosho	2016-present	37-11 (.771)
Makoto Ohashi	2020-2022	
Hiroshi Ono	2023-24	
Masakatsu Tsukada	2025-present	

== Current import players ==
Jersey #	Name	Position	Years with the team	Alma mater	Achievements
#3	Pierce Holley	QB	2025–present	Eastern Illinois University	X1 Super ROY (2025)
#8	Jason Smith	CB	2022–present	Auburn	All X1 Super Team (2025)
#85	Holden Huff	TE	2018–present	Boise State	3x All X-1 Super Team member (2022, 2024, 2025)

Former import players

Name	Position	Years with the team	Alma mater	Achievements
Tyler Kulka	QB	2023–2024	Lawrence Tech	
Cardell Rawlings	DL	2022–2023	Wingate	All X-League Super team member (2020)
Sean Draper	CB	2022	University of Iowa	3x All X-League Team member (2019, 2020, 2022)
Byron Beatty Jr.	DE/LB	2012–2021	Colorado	4x All X-League Team member (2013, 2016, 2019, 2021)
Jimmy Laughrea	QB	2020–2021	UC Davis	
Jason Fanaika	DL/LB	2019	Utah	
Skyler Howard	QB	2018–2019	West Virginia	
Kevin Jackson	DE	2005–2018	Hawai'i	10x All X-League Team member (2005–2014) 2x JXB MVP (2005, 2013) X League MVP (2005)
Ikaika Woolsey	QB	2017	Hawai'i	
Kealakai Maivai	OT	2013–2017	UCLA	X-League Rookie of the Year (2013), 3x All X-League Team member (2013, 2016, 2017)
Jerry Neuheisel	QB	2016	UCLA	
Frank Fernandez	C	2012–2015	Harvard	2x All X-League Team member (2008, 2011)
Karl Noa	DE	2009–2011	Hawai'i	All X-League Team member (2011)
Jabali Miller	CB	2005–2006	San Jose State	
