= Fujitsu Frontiers =

Professional American Football team based in Kawasaki, Kanagawa Prefecture

Logo

General information
- Founded: 1985
- Stadium: Kawasaki Stadium
- Headquartered: Kawasaki, Kanagawa
- Colors: FUJITSU Red, black, and white
- Mascot: Fronti the wolf
- Website: http://sports.jp.fujitsu.com/frontiers/

Personnel
- Owner: Hiroyuki Ono
- General manager: Takahide Yamada
- Head coach: Hiroshi Yamamoto

League / conference affiliations
- X-League; X1 Super Division

Championships
- Japan X Bowl titles: 9 (2014, 2016-19 & 2021-23
- Division championships: 10 (2000, 2002, 2007, 2009, 2013-2018)

The Fujitsu Frontiers are an American football team located in Kawasaki, Kanagawa, Japan. They are a member of the X-League. The Fujitsu Frontiers play their home games at the 2,700-capacity Kawasaki Stadium.

== Team history ==
- 1985 Team was founded by the Fujitsu Group.
- 1986 Promoted from X2 to X1.
- 1992 Pearl Bowl runner-up.
- 2000 Won first divisional title.
- 2002 Japan X Bowl runner-up.
- 2005 Satoshi Fujita hired as head coach.
- 2006 Won 1st Pearl Bowl Championship.
- 2009 Japan X Bowl runner-up.
- 2010 Won second Pearl Bowl Championship.
- 2014 Won 1st X-League title and 1st National title.
- 2015 Japan X Bowl Runner-up.
- 2016 Won 2nd X-League & National title.

== Seasons ==
X-League champions (1987–present)	Division champions	Final Stage/Semifinals Berth	Wild Card /2nd Stage Berth

Season	Division	Regular Season				Post Season Results	Awards	Head coaches
Season	Division	Finish	Wins	Losses	Ties	Post Season Results	Awards	Head coaches
1997	East	4th	2	3	0			Kurt Rose
1998	Central	4th	2	2	1			Kurt Rose
1999	Central	3rd	3	2	0			Kurt Rose
2000	East	1st	5	0	0	Won Wild Card match (at Nissan Prince Tokyo); Lost semi-finals match (Matsushita Electric Works)		Kurt Rose
2001	East	2nd	4	2	0	Lost Wild Card match (at Recruit) 14-24		Kurt Rose
2002	East	1st	5	0	0	Won Wild Card match (Onward) 20-17; Won Semi-finals match (at Matsushita Electric Works) 7-0; Lost Tokyo Super Bowl XVI (at Recruit) 7-14		Kurt Rose
2003	East	3rd	4	2	1			Kurt Rose
2004	Central	4th	2	3	0			Shima
2005	East	3rd	3	3	0			Satoshi Fujita
2006	Central	3rd	5	2	0			Satoshi Fujita
2007	East	1st	6	1	0	Won Semifinals match (Onward) 31-21; Lost Japan X Bowl XXI (Matsushita Denko) 13-33		Satoshi Fujita
2008	East	2nd	7	2	0	Lost Wild Card match (Kashima) 19-21		Satoshi Fujita
2009	East	1st	7	1	0	Won 2nd stage match (Nihon Unisys) 61-0; Won 2nd Stage match (Asahi Soft Drinks) 43-21; Won Final stage match (Asahi Beer) 31-21; Lost Japan X Bowl XXIII (Kashima) 14-21		Satoshi Fujita
2010	Central	2nd	8	1	0	Won 2nd stage match (Asahi Beer) 34-3; Lost 2nd stage match (Panasonic Denko) 6-23		Satoshi Fujita
2011	East	2nd	6	1	0	Won 2nd stage match (Asahi Beer) 58-14; Won 2nd stage match (Panasonic) 24-10; Won Final stage match (Nojima Sagamihara) 38-3; Lost Japan X Bowl XXV (Obic) 17-24		Satoshi Fujita
2012	Central	2nd	7	1	0	Won 2nd stage match (at As One) 27-9; Lost 2nd stage match (at Kashima) 15-27; Lost final stage match (at Kashima) 14-24		Satoshi Fujita
2013	East	1st	7	1	0	Won 2nd stage match (at As One) 55-0; Won 2nd stage match (Nojima Sagamihara) 45-24; Won Final stage match (Panasonic) 28-13; Lost Japan X Bowl XXVII (at Obic) 16-24	Keiya Hiramoto (MVP); Junpei Yoshimoto (ROY)	Satoshi Fujita
2014	East	1st	8	1	0	Won 2nd stage match (Asahi Beer) 65-0; Won 2nd stage match (at Panasonic ) 48-24; Won Final stage match (Obic) 27-17; Won Japan X Bowl XXVIII (IBM) 44-10; Won 68th Rice Bowl National Championship game (at Kwansei Gakuin) 33-24	Gino Gordon (MVP); Colby Cameron (ROY)	Satoshi Fujita
2015	East	1st	7	0	0	Won 2nd stage match (at Elecom Kobe) 28-7; Won 2nd Stage match (Lixil Deers) 34-24; Won Final stage match (Obic) 27-6; Lost Japan X Bowl XXIX (Panasonic) 21-24		Satoshi Fujita
2016	East	1st	8	1	0	Won Quarterfinals match (Asahi Soft Drinks) 42-6; Won Semi-finals match (IBM) 28-26; Won Japan X Bowl XXX (Obic) 16-3; Won 70th Rice Bowl National Championship game (at Kwansei Gakuin) 30-13	Colby Cameron (MVP)	Satoshi Fujita
2017	East	1st	7	2	0	Won Quarterfinals match (Elecom Kobe) 47-17; Won Semifinals match (Obic) 7-0; Won Japan X Bowl XXXI (IBM) 63-23; Won 71st Rice Bowl National Championship (Nihon U.) 37-9		Satoshi Fujita
2018	East	1st	8	1	0	Won Quarterfinals match (All Mitsubishi) 35-7; Won Semifinals match (Obic) 13-10; Won Japan X Bowl XXXII (IBM) 35-18; Won 72nd Rice Bowl National Championship (at Kwansei Gakuin U.) 52-17	Trashaun Nixon (MVP); Michael Birdsong (ROY)	Satoshi Fujita
2019	X1 Super	1st	9	1	0	Won Semifinals match (Elecom Kobe) 31-13; Won Japan X Bowl XXXIII (Panasonic) 28-26; Won 73rd Rice Bowl National Championship (Kwansei Gakuin U.) 38-14	Samajie Grant (X1 Super ROY & MVP)	Hiroshi Yamamoto
2020	X1 Super	1st	3	0	0	Lost Japan X Bowl XXXIV (Obic) 7-13		Hiroshi Yamamoto
2021	X1 Super	2nd	6	1	0	Won Semifinals match (Obic) 17-10; Won 75th Rice Bowl National Championship Game (Panasonic) 24-18		Hiroshi Yamamoto
2022	X1 Super Div. B	1st	7	0	0	Won Quarterfinals match (Asahi Beer) 65-3; Won Semifinals match (Elecom Kobe) 39-21; Won 76th Rice Bowl National Championship Game (Panasonic) 29-21	Trashaun Nixon (X1 Super MVP)	Hiroshi Yamamoto
2023	X1 Super Div. B	1st	6	1	1	Won Quarterfinals match (Tokyo Gas) 10-3; Won Semifinals match (Obic) 24-17; Won 77th Rice Bowl National Championship Game (Panasonic) 16-10	Trashaun Nixon (X1 Super MVP)	Hiroshi Yamamoto
2024	X1 Super	1st	8	2	0	Won Quarterfinals match (IBM) 49-14; Won Semifinals match (Sekisui) 52-21; Lost 78th Rice Bowl National Championship Game (Panasonic) 27-34	Samajie Grant (X1 Super MVP)	Hiroshi Yamamoto
2025	X1 Super Central	1st	5	3	0	Won Quarterfinals match (Nojima Sagamihara) 42-28; Lost Semifinals match (at Panasonic) 20-23		Hiroshi Yamamoto
Total			165	39	3	(1997–2025, includes only regular season)		
Total			48	16	0	(1997–2025, includes only playoffs)		
Total			213	55	3	(1997–2025, includes both regular season and playoffs)		

== Head coaches ==
Coach	Years	Record
Kurt Rose	1997–2003	28–12 (.700)
Shima	2004	2–3 (.400)
Satoshi Fujita	2005–2018	125–27 (.822)
Yo Yamamoto	2019–present	58–11–1 (.836)

== Current import players ==
Jersey #	Name	Position	Years with the team	Alma mater	Achievements
#0	Joe Mathis	OLB	2018–2019, 2021–present	Washington	3X All X-League Team member (2018, 2020, 2022)
#2	Trashaun Nixon	OLB/RB	2015–2018, 2020–present	New Mexico State	3x X-League MVP award (2018, 2022, 2023); 7x All X-League Team member (2016–2017, 2020–2024)
#4	Samajie Grant	RB/WR	2019-present	Arizona	X1 Super Rookie of the Year (2019); 2x X1 Super MVP (2019, 2024); X Bowl MVP (2019); 3x All X-League Super Team member (2019, 2020, 2024)

Former import players

Name	Position	Years with the team	Alma mater	Achievements
Al-Rilwan Adeyemi	CB	2013–2023	San Diego	11x All X-League Team member (2013–2017, 2020–2023)
Michael Birdsong	QB	2018–2020	Tennessee Tech	X-League ROY (2018); X1 Super MVP (2020); All X-League Super Team member (2020)
Colby Cameron	QB	2014–2017	Louisiana Tech	X-League MVP award (2016); X-League ROY award (2014); 2x All X-League Team member (2014, 2016)
Gino Gordon	RB	2013–2017	Harvard	X-League MVP award (2014); 3x All X-League Team member (2014, 2016, 2017)
Austin Flynn	DE	2014	Arkansas	
Andrew Seumalo	DE	2013	Oregon State	
Brad Brennan	WR	2002–2011	Arizona	2x All X-League Team member (2004, 2009)
