= Japan X Bowl =

American football championship game in Japan

The Japan X Bowl (previously the Japan Super Bowl) was the annual championship game of the X-League, the highest level of professional American football in Japan.

== Japan X Bowl (1987–2021) ==
Year	Bowl	Stadium	Winner	Score	Runner-up	Most Valuable Player (MVP) Award	Most Improved Player (MIP)	Attendance
1987	Tokyo Super Bowl I	Yokohama Stadium	Renown Rovers	31–28	Silver Star			
1988	Tokyo Super Bowl II	Tokyo Dome	Renown Rovers	28–20	Matsushita Electric Works Impulse			
1989	Tokyo Super Bowl III	Tokyo Dome	Asahi Beer Silver Star	14–9	NEC Falcons			
1990	Tokyo Super Bowl IV	Tokyo Dome	Matsushita Electric Works Impulse	14–6	Onward Oaks			
1991	Tokyo Super Bowl V	Tokyo Dome	Onward Oaks	49–10	Sunstar Finies			
1992	Tokyo Super Bowl VI	Tokyo Dome	Asahi Beer Silver Star	21–7	Matsushita Electric Works Impulse			
1993	Tokyo Super Bowl VII	Tokyo Dome	Asahi Beer Silver Star	13–0	Sunstar Finies			
1994	Tokyo Super Bowl VIII	Tokyo Dome	Matsushita Electric Works Impulse	48–28	Onward Oaks			
1995	Tokyo Super Bowl IX	Tokyo Dome	Matsushita Electric Works Impulse	54–20	Recruit Seagulls			
1996	Tokyo Super Bowl X	Tokyo Dome	Recruit Seagulls	30–10	Onward Oaks			
1997	Tokyo Super Bowl XI	Tokyo Dome	Kajima Deers	48–12	Matsushita Electric Works Impulse	RB Yasushi Horiguchi (Kajima)		38,500
1998	Tokyo Super Bowl XII	Tokyo Dome	Recruit Seagulls	45–24	Asahi Beer Silver Star	WR Takashi Horie (Recruit)		32,000
1999	Tokyo Super Bowl XIII	Tokyo Dome	Asahi Beer Silver Star	18–16	Kajima Deers	QB Kanaoka (Asahi Beer)		24,000
2000	Tokyo Super Bowl XIV	Tokyo Dome	Asahi Soft Drink Challengers	20–18	Matsushita Electric Works Impulse	Tamon Nakamura (Asahi Soft Drink)		25,000
2001	Tokyo Super Bowl XV	Tokyo Dome	Asahi Soft Drink Challengers	14–7	Matsushita Electric Works Impulse	LB Shinzo Yamada (Asahi Soft Drink)		25,000
2002	Tokyo Super Bowl XVI	Tokyo Dome	Seagulls	14–7	Fujitsu Frontiers	QB Daisuke Takahashi (Seagulls)		21,500
2003	Japan X Bowl XVII	Tokyo Dome	Onward Skylarks	13–10	Asahi Beer Silver Star	RB Yasuhiro Kabata (Onward)		22,500
2004	Japan X Bowl XVIII	Kobe Wing Stadium	Matsushita Electric Works Impulse	15–6	Asahi Beer Silver Star	K/P Masahiro Ota (Matsushita)		15,500
2005	Japan X Bowl XIX	Tokyo Dome	Obic Seagulls	25–16	Matsushita Electric Works Impulse	DE Kevin Jackson (Obic)		13,564
2006	Japan X Bowl XX	Kyocera Dome Osaka	Onward Skylarks	24–21	Kajima Deers	Takashi Kojima (Onward)		12,327
2007	Japan X Bowl XXI	Tokyo Dome	Matsushita Electric Works Impulse	33–13	Fujitsu Frontiers	QB Tetsuo Takata (Matsushita)		17,629
2008	Japan X Bowl XXII	Kyocera Dome Osaka	Panasonic Electric Works Impulse	28–14	Kajima Deers	Jindai Ishino (Panasonic)		13,834
2009	Japan X Bowl XXIII	Tokyo Dome	Kajima Deers	21–14	Fujitsu Frontiers	WR Naoki Maeda (Kajima)		22,059
2010	Japan X Bowl XXIV	Tokyo Dome	Obic Seagulls	20–16	Panasonic Electric Works Impulse	QB Shun Sugawara (Obic)	S Atsushi Tsuji (Panasonic)	18,353
2011	Japan X Bowl XXV	Tokyo Dome	Obic Seagulls	24–17	Fujitsu Frontiers	WR Noriaki Kinoshita (Obic)	QB Hiroshi Izuhara (Fujitsu)	19,864
2012	Japan X Bowl XXVI	Tokyo Dome	Obic Seagulls	27–24	Kajima Deers	RB Takuto Hara (Obic)	S Hiroki Kato (Kajima)	23,126
2013	Japan X Bowl XXVII	Tokyo Dome	Obic Seagulls	24–16	Fujitsu Frontiers	DE Kevin Jackson (Obic)	CB Al-Riwan Adeyami (Fujitsu)	22,488
2014	Japan X Bowl XXVIII	Tokyo Dome	Fujitsu Frontiers	44–10	IBM Big Blue	RB Gino Gordon (Fujitsu)	TE John Stanton (IBM)	25,085
2015	Japan X Bowl XXIX	Tokyo Dome	Panasonic Impulse	24–21	Fujitsu Frontiers	QB Tetsuo Takata (Panasonic)	WR Junpei Yoshimoto (Fujitsu)	25,408
2016	Japan X Bowl XXX	Tokyo Dome	Fujitsu Frontiers	16–3	Obic Seagulls	QB Colby Cameron (Fujitsu)	DL Hiroaki Nakazato (Obic)	25,455
2017	Japan X Bowl XXXI	Tokyo Dome	Fujitsu Frontiers	63–23	IBM Big Blue	WR Teruaki Clark Nakamura (Fujitsu)	-	22,953
2018	Japan X Bowl XXXII	Tokyo Dome	Fujitsu Frontiers	35–18	IBM Big Blue	RB Trashaun Nixon (Fujitsu)	-	25,457
2019	Japan X Bowl XXXIII	Tokyo Dome	Fujitsu Frontiers	28–26	Panasonic Impulse	RB Samajie Grant (Fujitsu)	-	20,000
2020	Japan X Bowl XXXIV	Tokyo Dome	Obic Seagulls	13–7	Fujitsu Frontiers	RB Taku Lee (Obic)	-	

== Japan X Bowl appearances by team ==
Appearances	Team	Wins	Losses	Winning percentage
15	Panasonic Impulse	7	8	.467
12	Fujitsu Frontiers	5	7	.416
11	Obic Seagulls	9	2	.818
8	Asahi Beer Silver Star	4	4	.500
6	Onward Skylarks	3	3	.500
6	Lixil Deers	2	4	.333
3	IBM Big Blue	0	3	.000
2	Asahi Soft Drink Challengers	3	0	1.000
2	Renown Rovers	2	0	1.000
2	Elecom Kobe Finies	0	2	.000
1	NEC Falcons	0	1	.000
