= Transportation in Salt Lake City =

Transportation in Salt Lake City consists of a wide network of roads, an extensive bus system, a light rail system, and a commuter rail line. Although Salt Lake City, Utah, is a traditionally car-oriented city (as are most other cities in the western United States), the rapidly growing public transit system has a high number of riders for a city of its size, and public transit is widely supported by its residents and businesses.

Nearly all public transit in the city is operated by the Utah Transit Authority. In addition to operating the bus system, it also operates the TRAX light rail system, which contains three lines, the first of which runs from downtown south to Draper, the second runs from University of Utah southwest to South Jordan, and the third from the Salt Lake City International Airport east through downtown and then southwest to West Valley City. A commuter rail line, called the FrontRunner, runs north through Davis County to Ogden in central Weber County and south to Provo in central Utah County. UTA also operates a streetcar line that connects the Sugar House neighborhood with the TRAX system in South Salt Lake. The road system is also extensive, with three interstate highways, two additional state freeways, a limited-access highway, and a third state freeway under development/construction. However, the geographic constrictions of the Salt Lake Valley, as well as its rapid population growth, have led to severe congestion problems.

== Roads ==
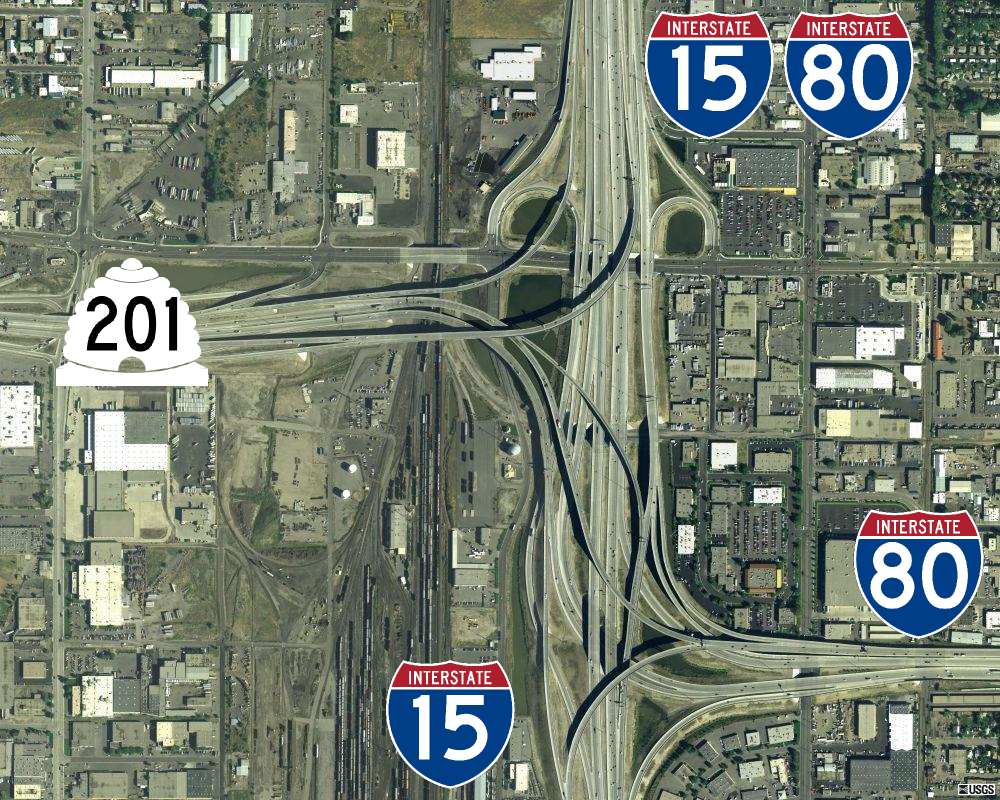
The "Spaghetti Bowl"

Two major interstate highways, Interstate 15 and Interstate 80, intersect just west of downtown. I-15 comes in from the north end of the state, through Davis County, and heads straight south through the Salt Lake Valley and on through Utah County to leave the state on its southwest corner. I-80 comes in from the west side of the state, through Tooele County and passes the Salt Lake City International Airport before merging with I-15 west of downtown. The merge continues south for about 3 miles (4.8 km) before I-80 continues east. It passes through largely residential areas through northern South Salt Lake and the Sugar House neighborhood of Salt Lake City before ascending Parley's Canyon, passing through Summit County, and leaving the state on its northeast corner.

Interstate 215, known as the "Belt Route", forms a 270° loop around Salt Lake City and its first-ring suburbs. It enters the Rose Park neighborhood in northwestern Salt Lake City from Davis County (where it recently split from I-15) and continues south, intersecting I-80 and State Route 201 before turning east in Taylorsville, intersecting I-15 in Murray, and turning north in Holladay. From there it parallels the Wasatch Range through the affluent residential eastern suburbs before ending at I-80 at the mouth of Parley's Canyon. This belt route largely serves as a commuter route for the suburbs.

The 2002 Winter Olympics prompted an urgent acceleration of the already planned massive overhaul of I-15, from 600 North in Salt Lake City to 10600 South in Sandy. The interstate was expanded to ten lanes, including two high-occupancy vehicle (HOV/express) lanes. Portions of I-80 and I-215 were also reconstructed. Since original construction, the HOV lanes have been evolved to what the Utah Department of Transportation (UDOT) refers to as Express Lanes. These Express Lanes, also known as High-occupancy toll lanes (HOT lanes) are for use by vehicles with two or more persons (including buses), motorcycles, and clean-fuel vehicles. Other vehicles can also use the lanes if they use an Express Pass. The Express Pass allows for automatic electronic toll collection. Tolls vary by distance driven in the lanes and current traffic congestion.

State Route 201, known locally as the "21st South Freeway" or the "201", is a freeway that heads westward from the southern I-80/I-15 junction, known as the "Spaghetti Bowl", along the border of Salt Lake City and West Valley City. This is a largely congested route that serves much of the west side commuter traffic. As it dips southward into Magna, it is downgraded to an expressway, although it is eventually planned to be upgraded to a freeway as traffic from Tooele County increases. It continues westward to I-80 near the Tooele County line. In addition to serving the west side of the valley, SR-201 also serves as a commuter freeway for Tooele County and an alternative to I-80 when needed.

Bangerter Highway (State Route 154) is an expressway that serves the quickly growing west and south sides of the valley. It begins near I-15 in Draper then heads west through Bluffdale and Riverton before heading north along the west side of the valley through South Jordan, West Jordan, West Valley City, and Salt Lake City before crossing over I-80 and ending at the Salt Lake City International Airport. Another expressway, that will eventually become a freeway, is the Mountain View Corridor (SR-85 and a section of the Legacy Highway project) which runs from Utah County along the west side of the valley until it reaches I-80. So far only the frontage road portion of the section that runs from Redwood Road (SR-68) at about 16000 South north to 5400 South (SR-73) at 6400 West has been completed. Construction on the section north to 4100 South has begun. However, these frontage roads function as a four-lane divided expressway until the freeway is completed.

Another major roadway through the valley is State Street, which is the portion of US-89 that runs due south through the valley from Downtown Salt Lake City to Draper, before connecting with I-15.

== Public Transit ==
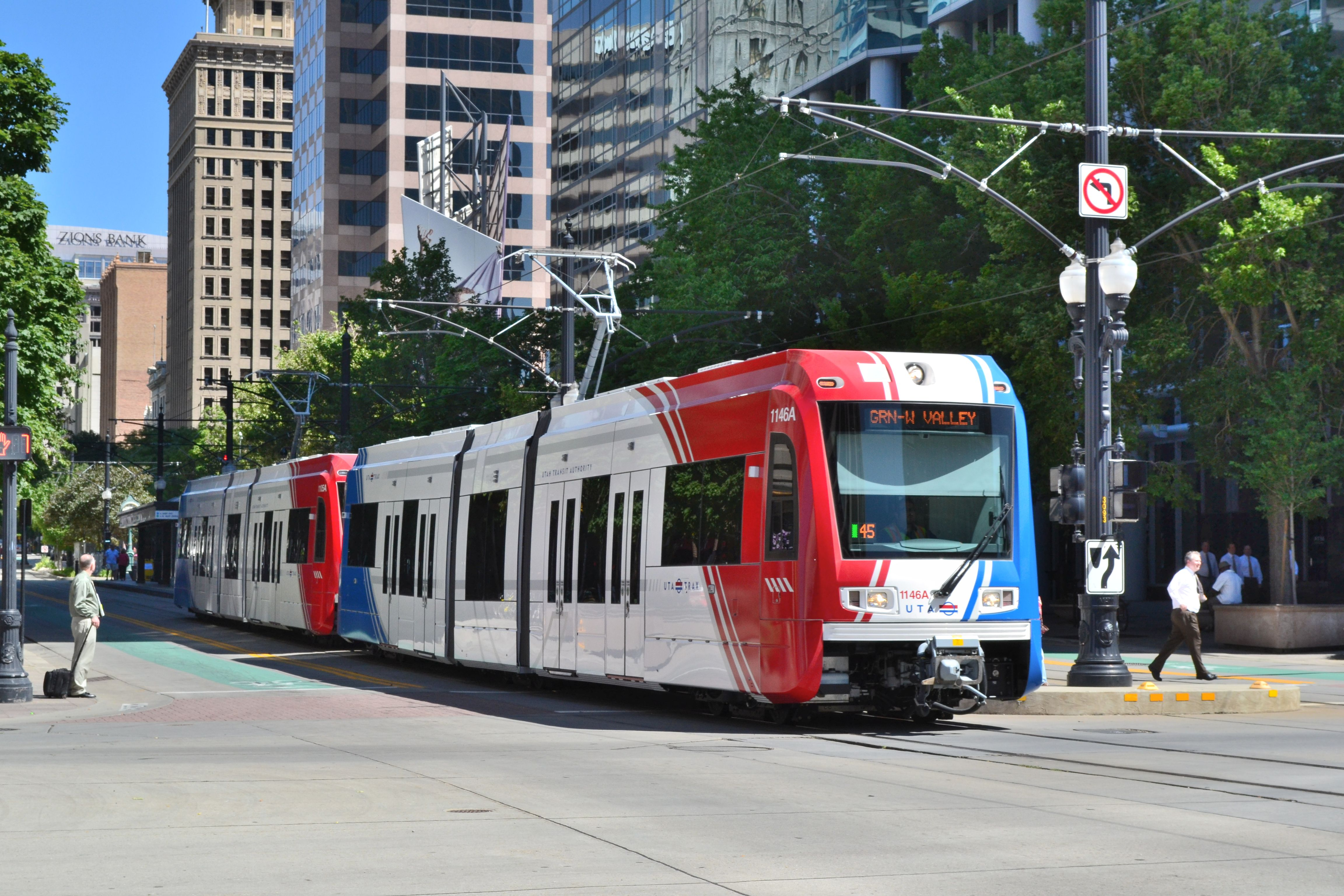
A TRAX train in downtown Salt Lake City.

There are several modes of public transportation, nearly all of which are operated by the Utah Transit Authority (UTA).

=== Light Rail (TRAX) ===
TRAX is a 52-station, 45-mile (72 km) light rail system (officially called, but rarely known as, "Transit Express") that serves Salt Lake County. In anticipation of the 2002 Winter Olympics, the system was approved in 1995. The first line began service on December 4, 1999 and currently links downtown with Draper, and another line to the University of Utah was completed in 2001, with an extension to the University of Utah Health Sciences Center in 2003. Extensions to West Valley City and to South Jordan were opened in 2011, an extension from downtown to the Salt Lake City International Airport opened in April 2013, and an extension from Sandy to Draper opened in August 2013. There are also eventual plans for a TRAX line to connect the Airport extension to the South Jordan extension, roughly along 5600 West (SR-172). In the far future, light rail might also be extended into southern Davis County and northern Utah County.

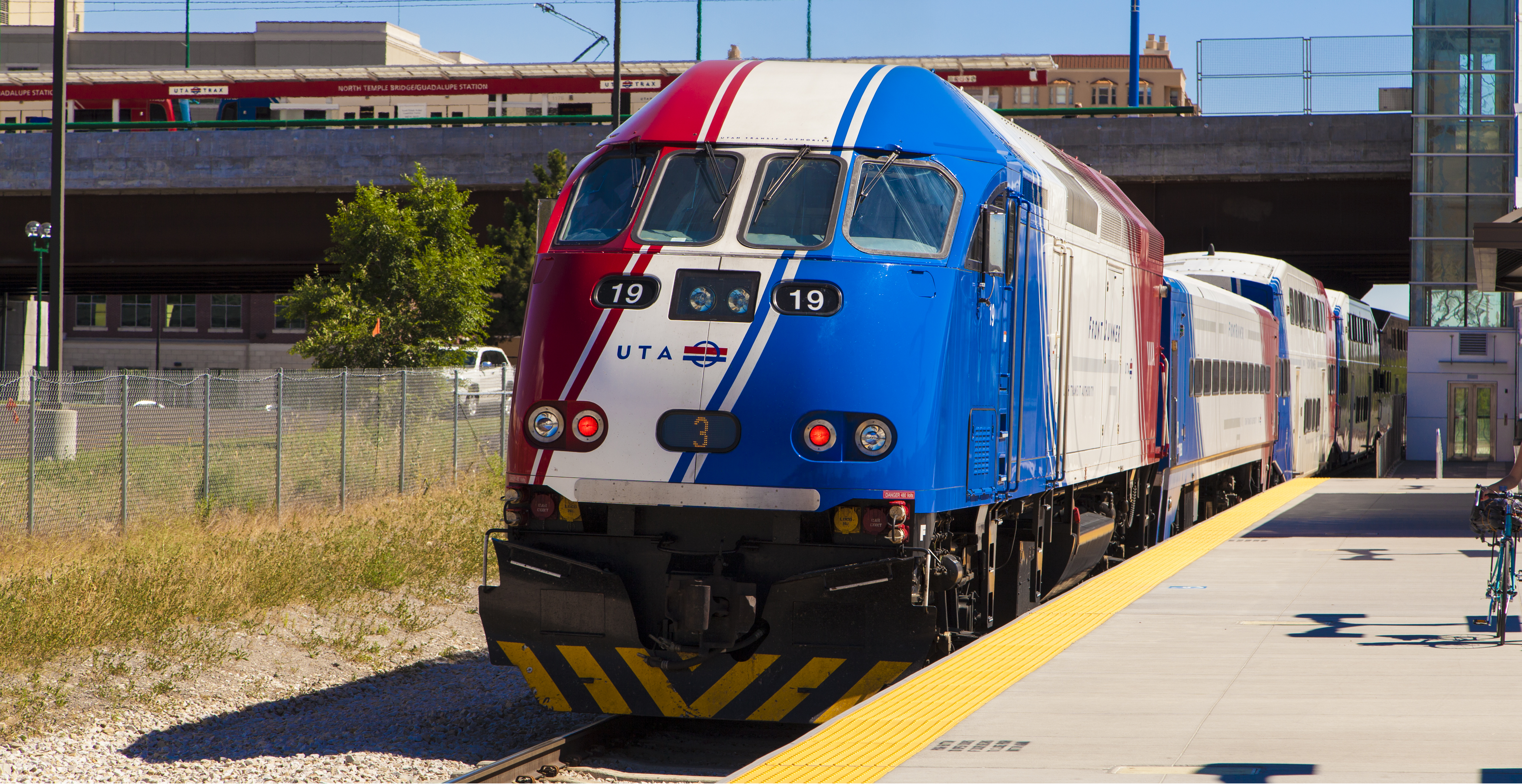
The FrontRunner at North Temple station

=== Commuter Rail (the FrontRunner) ===
The FrontRunner (so named because it runs along the Wasatch Front urban corridor), is a 16-station, 88-mile (142 km) commuter rail line that runs from Ogden to Provo through Salt Lake City. By 2040, it is expected to extend from Brigham City in Box Elder County to Santaquin in southern Utah County, the approximate extents of the Wasatch Front. Construction on the first segment, between Salt Lake City and Pleasant View (just north of Ogden) began on August 10, 2005 and was opened north to Ogden on April 26, 2008. The FrontRunner was extended to Pleasant View station on September 29, 2008, offering morning and evening service past Ogden. Although service north of Ogden was cancelled in August 2018. The FrontRunner South extension south to Provo (in central Utah County) opened for service on December 10, 2012.

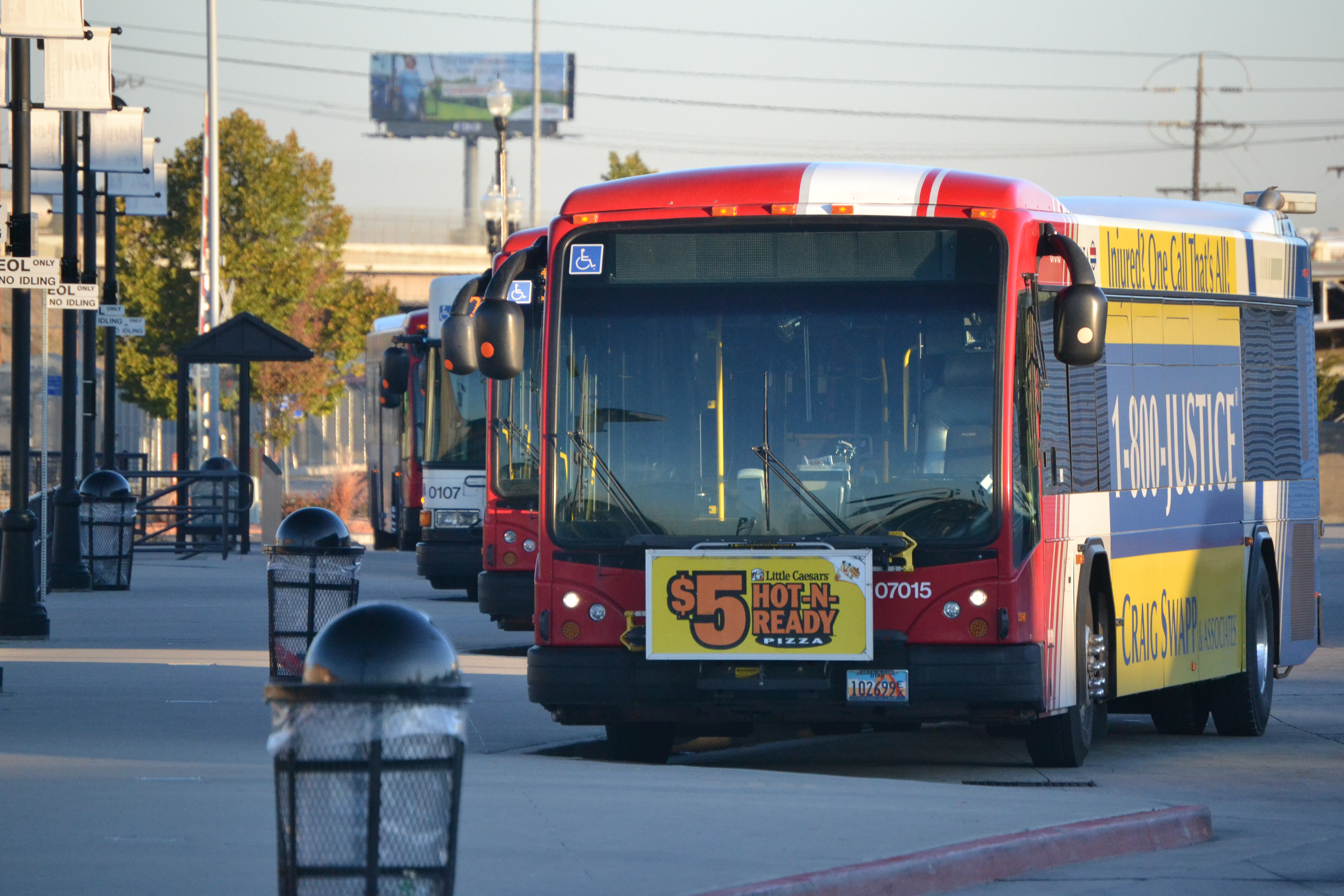
UTA buses at the Salt Lake City Intermodal Hub (Salt Lake Central station)

=== Bus ===
UTA also runs the bus system in the Salt Lake City area. The bus system reaches almost everywhere within Salt Lake City, and many points in the Salt Lake Valley and beyond, serving the entire length of the Wasatch Front. Other services provided by UTA include a paratransit service, which has curbside pickup for disabled riders, express buses running between Salt Lake City and its major suburbs, and winter service to the ski resorts in the Wasatch Range.

Transit service (bus and light rail) is free within Downtown Salt Lake City and the adjacent area up to the State Capitol, UTA refers to this area as its Free Fare Zone.

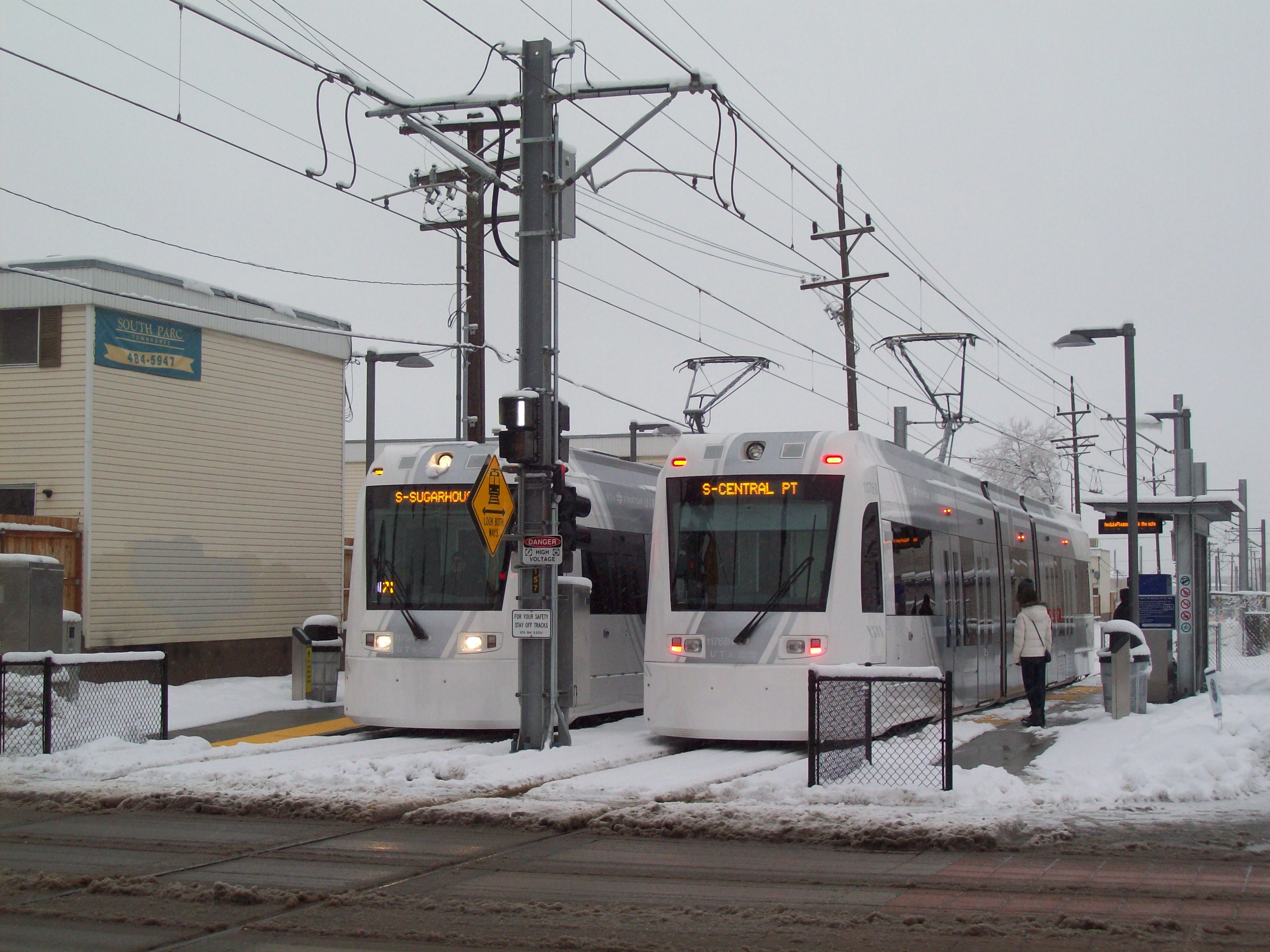
S Line trains in South Salt Lake (as viewed from Sugar House, December 2013)

=== Streetcar ===
For several years city officials have been studying the idea of building a modern streetcar line, a lower-speed and lower-capacity type of rail system than the TRAX light rail, and similar to the Portland Streetcar and Seattle's South Lake Union Streetcar, both of which have been visited and studied by Salt Lake officials in connection with this proposal. The S Line (formerly known as Sugar House Streetcar) began service in December 2013. The S Line connects the Central Pointe TRAX station in South Salt Lake with the Sugar House business district, running along a two-mile (3.2 km) rail right-of-way at about 2300 South. This developed from an earlier proposal for a heritage streetcar line. The estimated cost was $40 million to $50 million, but officials predicted that the line will generate much new property development in the areas through which it would run and would raise the value of existing development. The city of Salt Lake providing $2.5 million (equivalent to $3.75 million in 2025) and requested money from the federal government to have the line completed by 2012.

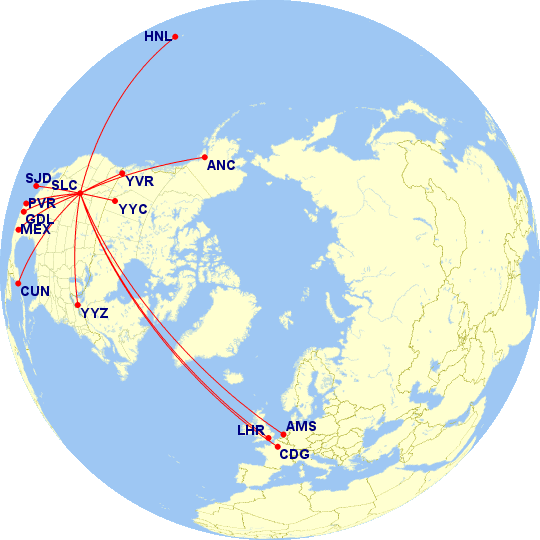
Nonstop routes from Salt Lake City to destinations outside of the contiguous United States in 2016

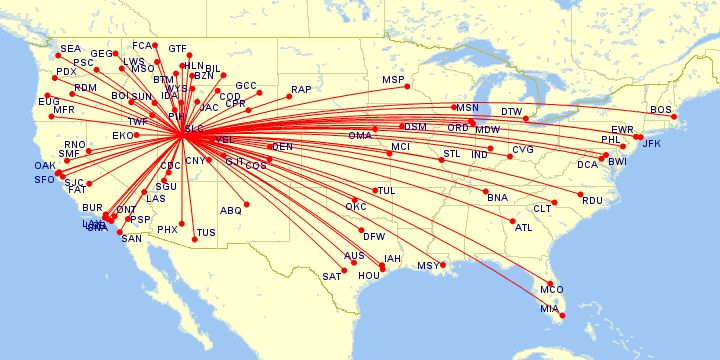
Nonstop routes from Salt Lake City to destinations in the contiguous United States in 2016

== Air ==
Salt Lake City is serviced by the Salt Lake City International Airport and serves as a hub for Delta Air Lines and Delta Connection partner SkyWest Airlines. The airport offers non-stop domestic and international flights to cities such as New York, Los Angeles, Washington D.C., San Francisco, Atlanta, Chicago, Houston, Amsterdam, London, Vancouver, Calgary, Mexico City, Guadalajara, Cancun, and Paris. A regional airport, known as South Valley Regional Airport (formerly known as Salt Lake Airport 2), is located in West Jordan and serves as a general aviation and military helicopter training airport.

== Passenger rail and bus ==
Amtrak (the National Railroad Passenger Corporation) provides service to Salt Lake City and the Salt Lake City Intermodal Hub, operating its California Zephyr daily in both directions between Chicago, Illinois, and Emeryville, California (in the San Francisco Bay Area). The next westbound stop is in Winnemucca and the next eastbound station is in Provo.

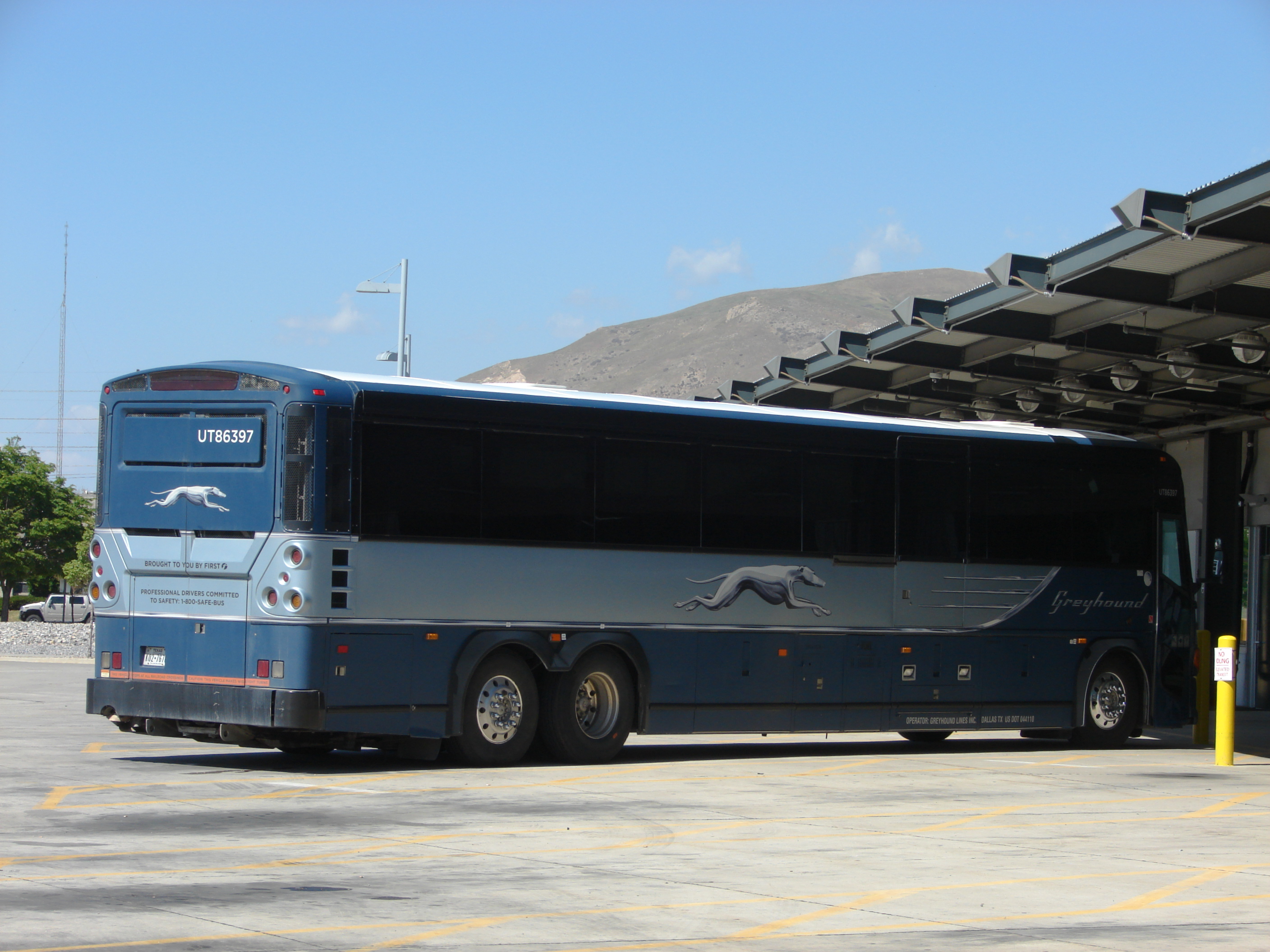
A Greyhound bus parked at the Salt Lake City Intermodal Hub

Greyhound Lines, provides interstate and intercity commercial bus service and operates out of the Salt Lake Intermodal Hub. Destinations for direct routes include Denver, Colorado; Portland, Oregon; Las Vegas, Nevada; and Reno, Nevada. Some of Greyhound's connections are operated in conjunction with Amtrak's Amtrak Thruway.

Salt Lake Express also serves the Salt Lake City Transit Center, with shuttle and intercity bus service to destinations in Utah and nearby western states.

== Taxi ==
Three taxicab services exist in Salt Lake City: Ute Cab, City Cab, and Yellow Cab. In 2004, a controversy sprung up between entrepreneurs wishing to enter the taxi market in the city, and the mayor's office, which has maintained tight restrictions on the taxi fleet. The controversy was fueled by Yellow Cab's advocacy of Mayor Rocky Anderson's re-election campaign by displaying the mayor's campaign ads wrapped around the company's taxis, and further by the decision by the mayor's campaign not to report this as a political in-kind contribution. Anderson drove a cab for Yellow Cab while in college.

== See also ==
- Plug-in electric vehicles in Utah § Salt Lake City
