= Jordan Landing =

- Location: West Jordan, Utah, United States
- Coordinates: 40°37′N 111°59′W
- Opened: 1999
- Developer: Foursquare Properties
- Owner: Fairbourne Properties
- Architect: Foursquare Properties
- Num. of stores: 102
- Num. of anchor tenants: 10
- Floor area: 21,780,000 square feet (2,023,000 m^{2})
- Floors: 1
- Website: jordan-landing.com

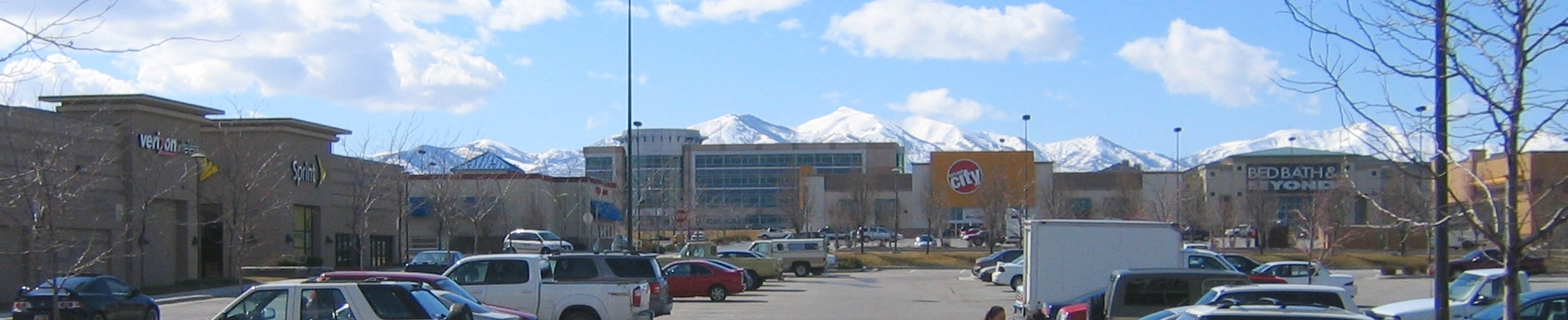
An exterior of typical retail stores in Jordan Landing

Jordan Landing is a master-planned development located in the center of West Jordan, Utah, adjacent to South Valley Regional Airport, also known as Airport 2. Its 500-acre (200-hectare) size, containing 1,400,000 square feet (130,000 m^{2}) of retail space, 1,200 residential units, and 1,500,000 square feet (140,000 m^{2}) of office space, places it as a focal point of West Jordan's booming economy.

It is one of the largest mixed-use developments in the Intermountain West. Built on former corn fields (these fields were silage corn) and next to Bangerter Highway, with the first phase having its groundbreaking in 1999, Jordan Landing has been criticized for drawing traffic from across the Salt Lake Valley to a formerly rural area, overwhelming infrastructure, and acting as a catalyst for urban sprawl. However, many developers have cited Jordan Landing's success and positive impact on population growth, with some calling it a catalyst, in their decision to begin construction on their own nearby large mixed-use developments. Among them are Utah's Boyer Company, America's largest homebuilder D. R. Horton, and European mining multinational Rio Tinto Group.

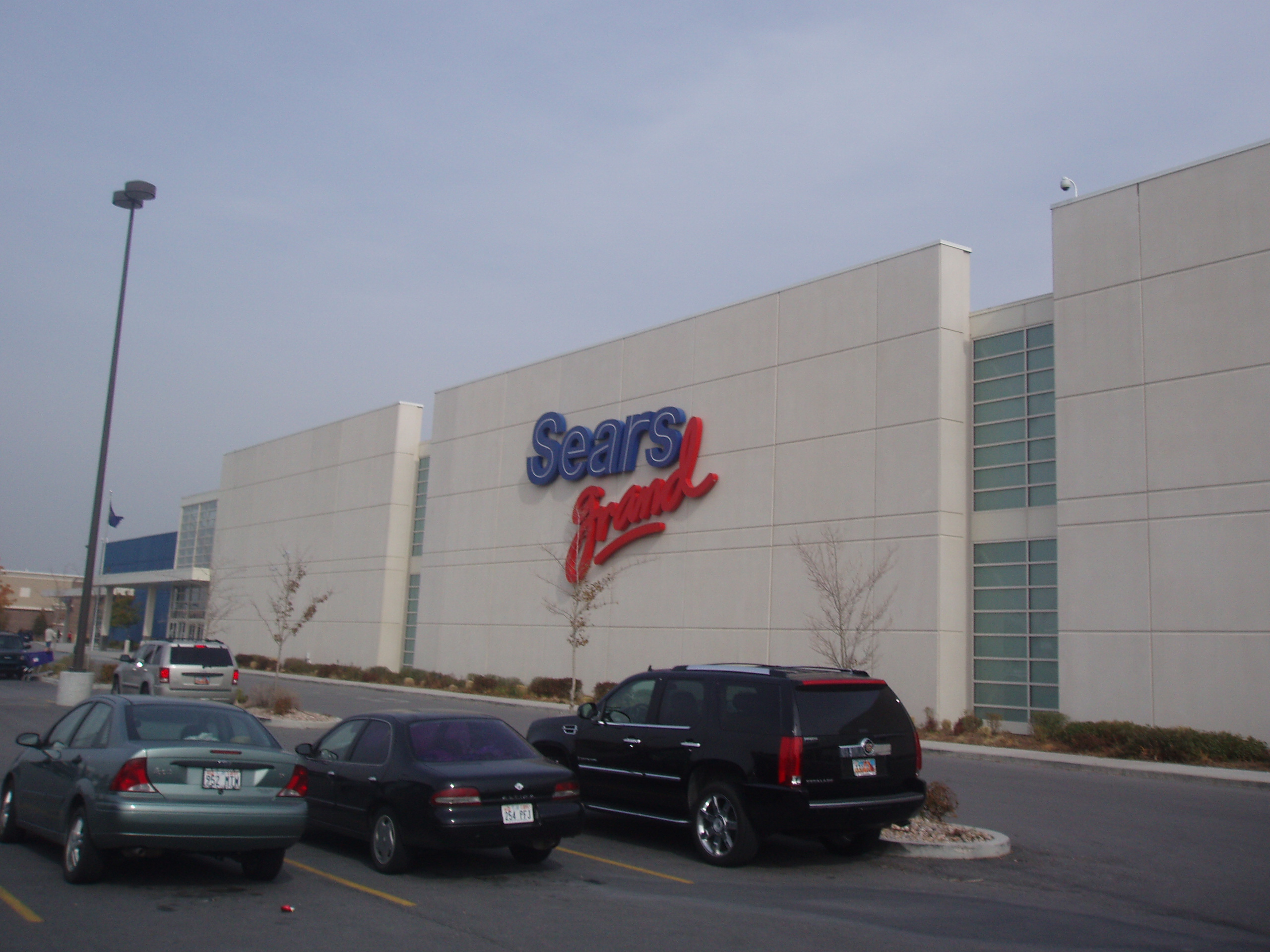
Sears Grand in 2007. This was downsized to a regular Sears in 2017 and closed in November 2018.

The shopping center had two "superstores": a Walmart Supercenter and the first ever Sears Grand, which was remodeled, downsized, and converted to a regular Sears in 2017. In 2015, Sears Holdings spun off 235 of its properties, including the Sears Grand at Jordan Landing, into Seritage Growth Properties. Burlington opened in the part of the former Sears Grand space in 2017. On August 22, 2018, it was announced that Sears would be closing as part of a plan to close 46 stores nationwide. The store closed in November 2018. In early 2019, the former Sears space became At Home. The Walmart Supercenter was the first such store in the Salt Lake City area and is consistently rated among the busiest in the United States, attracting 80,000 shoppers a week. Jordan Landing also contains 12 dine-in restaurants, and 13 fast-food establishments, mostly of the national chain variety.

Jordan Landing is also the location of Utah's largest cinema by number of screens, a 24-screen Cinemark theater (the largest theater by seats is Larry H. Miller's 20 screen megaplex in the nearby "The District" in South Jordan, in which seats are more tightly packed).

Mountain America Credit Union and Cyprus Credit Union have their corporate headquarters in Jordan Landing. The community also contains many apartments, condominiums, and townhouses. Additionally, there are two hotels built — a Hampton Inn and a Residence Inn by Marriott opened there in 2018.

In 2020, it was announced that the Bed Bath & Beyond would close as part of a plan to close 63 stores by the end of 2020. Ashley Furniture later replaced the former store.

== Anchors ==
- Ashley HomeStore - former Bed Bath & Beyond
- At Home - former Sears
- Best Buy
- Burlington - former Sears
- Five Below - former Payless ShoeSource
- Kohl's
- Lowe's
- Planet Fitness - former Sears
- Ross Dress For Less - former Circuit City
- Sam's Club
- Target
- Walmart Supercenter
