= Salt Lake City Municipal Airport =

Salt Lake Municipal Airport may refer to:

- Salt Lake City Municipal 2 Airport in West Jordan
- The former name of Salt Lake City International Airport
