= SkyWest Airlines Flight 1834 =

1987 mid-air collision

Accident
- Date: January 15, 1987
- Summary: Mid-air collision
- Site: Kearns, Utah, United States; 40°39′20″N 112°0′0″W
- Total fatalities: 10
- Total survivors: 0

First aircraft
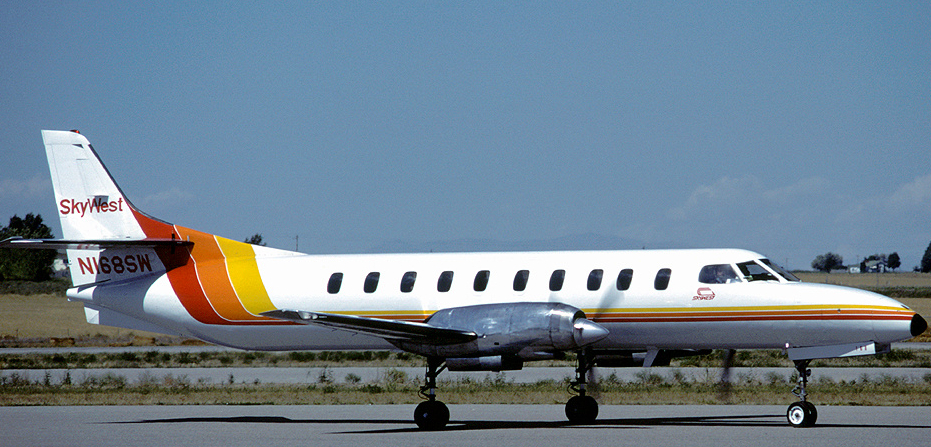
- A SkyWest Airlines Swearingen SA-226TC Metro II identical to the first aircraft involved
- Type: Swearingen SA226-TC Metro II
- Operator: SkyWest Airlines
- ICAO flight No.: SKW834
- Call sign: SKYWEST 834
- Registration: N163SW
- Flight origin: Pocatello Regional Airport, Idaho
- Destination: Salt Lake City International Airport, Utah
- Occupants: 8
- Passengers: 6
- Crew: 2
- Fatalities: 8
- Survivors: 0

Second aircraft
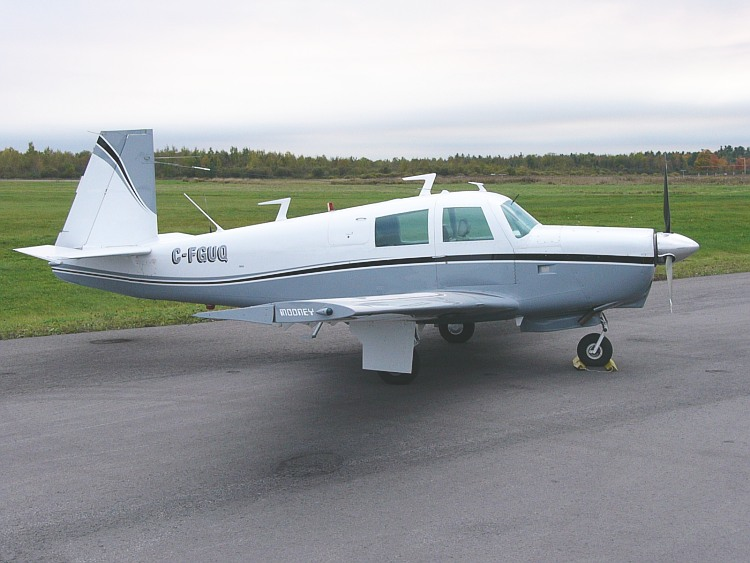
- A Mooney M20C similar to accident aircraft
- Type: Mooney M20
- Operator: private
- Registration: N6485U
- Flight origin: South Valley Regional Airport, West Jordan, Utah
- Occupants: 2
- Passengers: 0
- Crew: 2
- Fatalities: 2
- Survivors: 0

On Thursday, January 15, 1987, SkyWest Airlines Flight 1834, a Swearingen SA-226TC (Metro II), and a Mooney M20 were involved in a midair collision at 12:52 MST (UTC−7) near Kearns, Utah, a suburb southwest of Salt Lake City. All ten aboard the two aircraft were killed: two pilots and six passengers aboard the Metro II and two aboard the Mooney.

National Transportation Safety Board (NTSB) investigators primarily blamed the small plane pilots for wandering into restricted airspace, but a judge later assigned 51% responsibility to FAA air traffic controllers.

== Collision ==
The SkyWest Airlines aircraft, which was 30 minutes late from Pocatello, Idaho, was on final approach to Runway 34 of Salt Lake City International Airport, piloted by Captain Michael Gambill and First Officer Walter Ray. The Mooney M20 took off from Salt Lake City Municipal Airport II (now South Valley Regional Airport) in West Jordan, piloted by flight instructor Paul Lietz and his student, Chester Baker, the plane's owner.

The air traffic controller watching the area failed to recognize the danger when the Mooney pilots wandered into restricted airspace. The controller did not notice the small plane on the radar and directed the SkyWest pilots to turn. Making that turn, the SkyWest plane collided with the Mooney. The collision was at an approximate altitude of 7,000 feet (2,100 m) above sea level, about a half-mile (800 m) above ground level.

Residents below the collision reported a "big boom," and then, "parts were flying everywhere". The main section of the SkyWest aircraft slid through a chain-link fence, stopping in the middle of a suburban street. Wreckage scattered over a one-mile-square area, with body parts hanging from trees. Authorities had to open a temporary morgue at a nearby church as they recovered the victims.

== Investigation ==
The NTSB investigation ultimately blamed the Mooney M20 instructor pilot for straying into the Salt Lake City airport radar service area. The investigation also criticized the lack of a Mode-C transponder and the limitations of air traffic control collision protection.

In late 1990, U.S. district judge Thomas Greene ruled FAA air traffic controllers were 51% responsible for the crash and the Mooney pilots were 49% at fault.

== See also ==
- Aeroméxico Flight 498 - another collision between a private aircraft and a commercial airliner
- Pacific Southwest Airlines Flight 182
- N600XL
- 2002 Überlingen mid-air collision - another collision involving an air controller
