= Gardner Mill =

- Gardner Village
- U.S. National Register of Historic Places
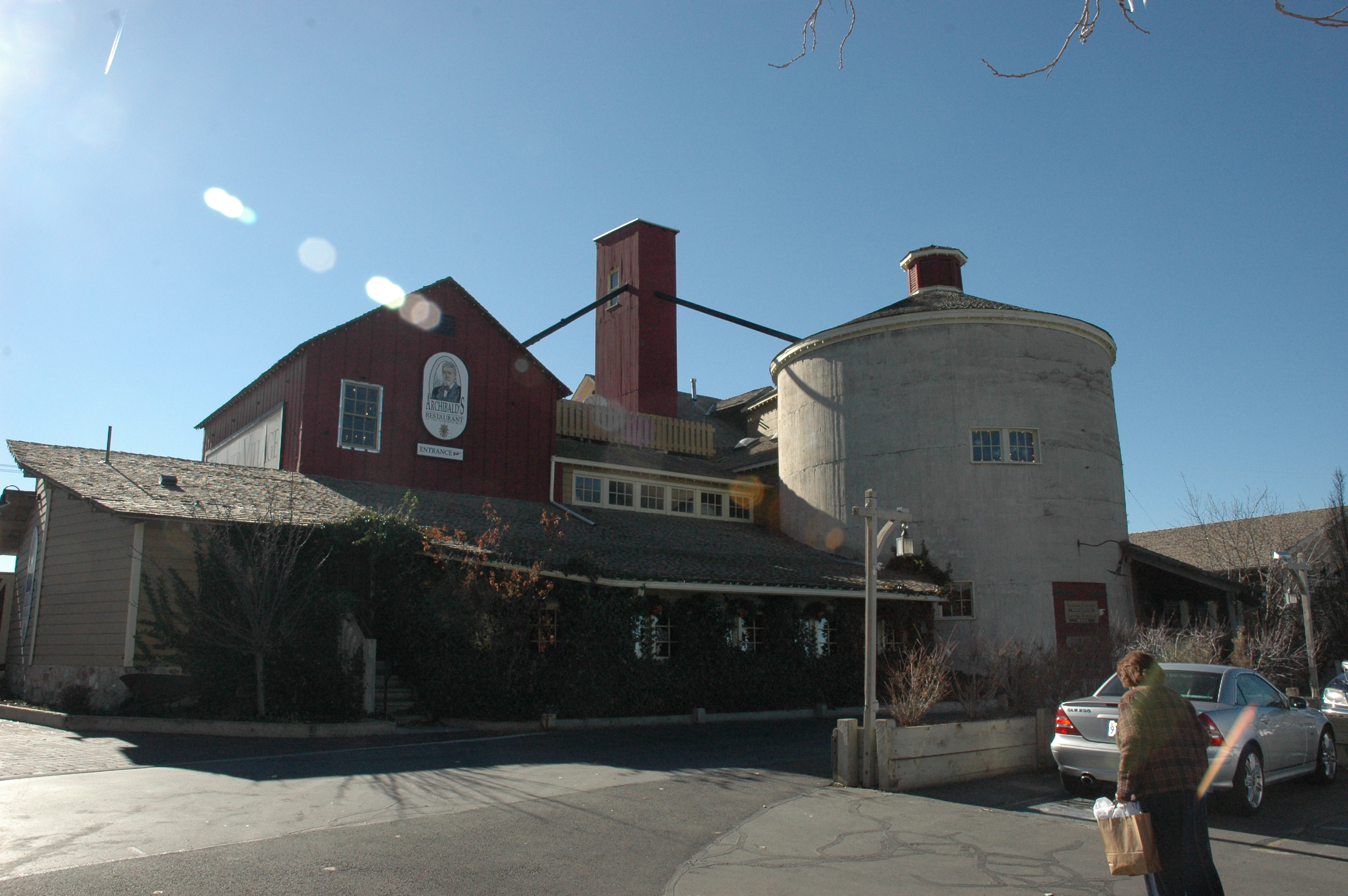
- Gardner Mill, November 2011

- Location within Utah Location within the United States
- Location: 1100 West 7800 South; West Jordan, Utah; United States
- Coordinates: 40°36′33″N 111°55′21″W
- Area: 1.5 acres (0.61 ha)
- Built: 1877
- Built by: Archibald Gardner
- Architectural style: Greek Revival, Federal
- NRHP reference No.: 82004153
- Added to NRHP: September 29, 1982

The Gardner Mill, at 1100 West 7800 South in West Jordan, Utah, United States was built in 1877 and is the focal point of today's Gardner Village.

== Description ==
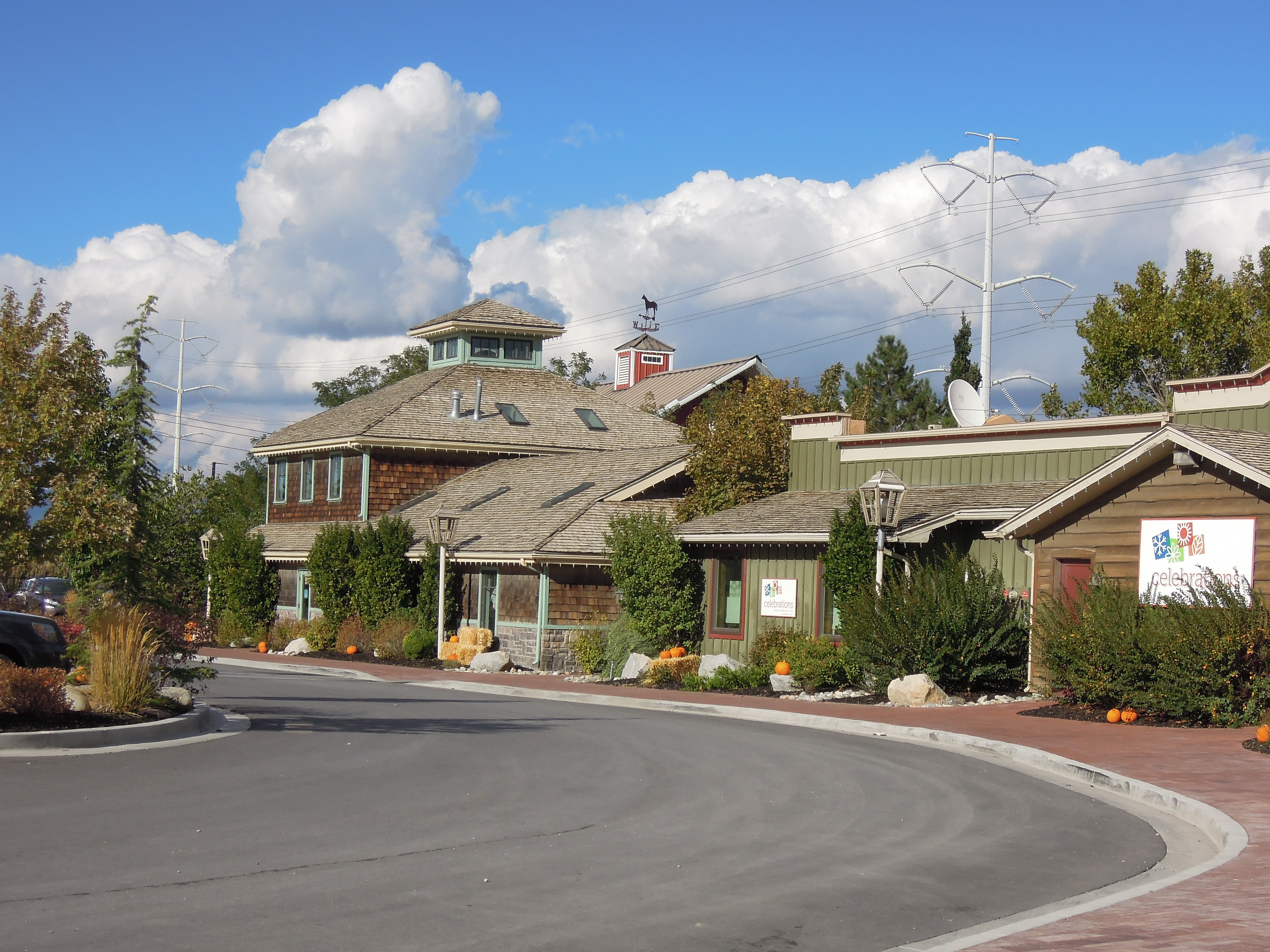
Some of the boutiques at Gardner Village, September 2016

The mill includes Greek Revival, and Federal architecture and has also been known as West Jordan Mill. It was listed on the National Register of Historic Places in 1982.

It is historically significant for association with Archibald Gardner, a Scottish immigrant and pioneer builder of more than 30 flour mills, sawmills, and other mills in Utah and Wyoming, as well as having built canals, roads, and dams.

The current Gardner Mill was a replacement of an earlier one, and included Federal architecture styling. It is the only surviving mill in Utah that is documented to be one of Gardner's works.

Other NRHP-listed or -nominated mills in Utah include: Isaac Chase Mill, Salt Lake County; Joseph Wall Gristmill, Sevier County; E. T. Benson Mill, Tooele County; Huntington Roller Mill, Emery County; Bicknell Gristmill, Wayne County; and the Burch-Taylor Mill (formerly listed), Weber County.

The mill and surrounding buildings have been turned into Gardner Village, that has restaurants, small shops and event venues nestled around the Gardner Mill. The mill itself houses a restaurant and a furniture store. Gardner Village has been operating since May 1980.

The mill also includes a petting zoo located in the southwest end opened in 2016, housing various farm animals such as chickens, pigs, alpacas, sheep, goats and emus, hosting pony rides. In 2023, the petting zoo was later modernized as part of a small amusement park known as Ricochet Canyon.

== See also ==
- National Register of Historic Places listings in Salt Lake County, Utah
