= Climate change in Utah =

Climate change in the US state of Utah

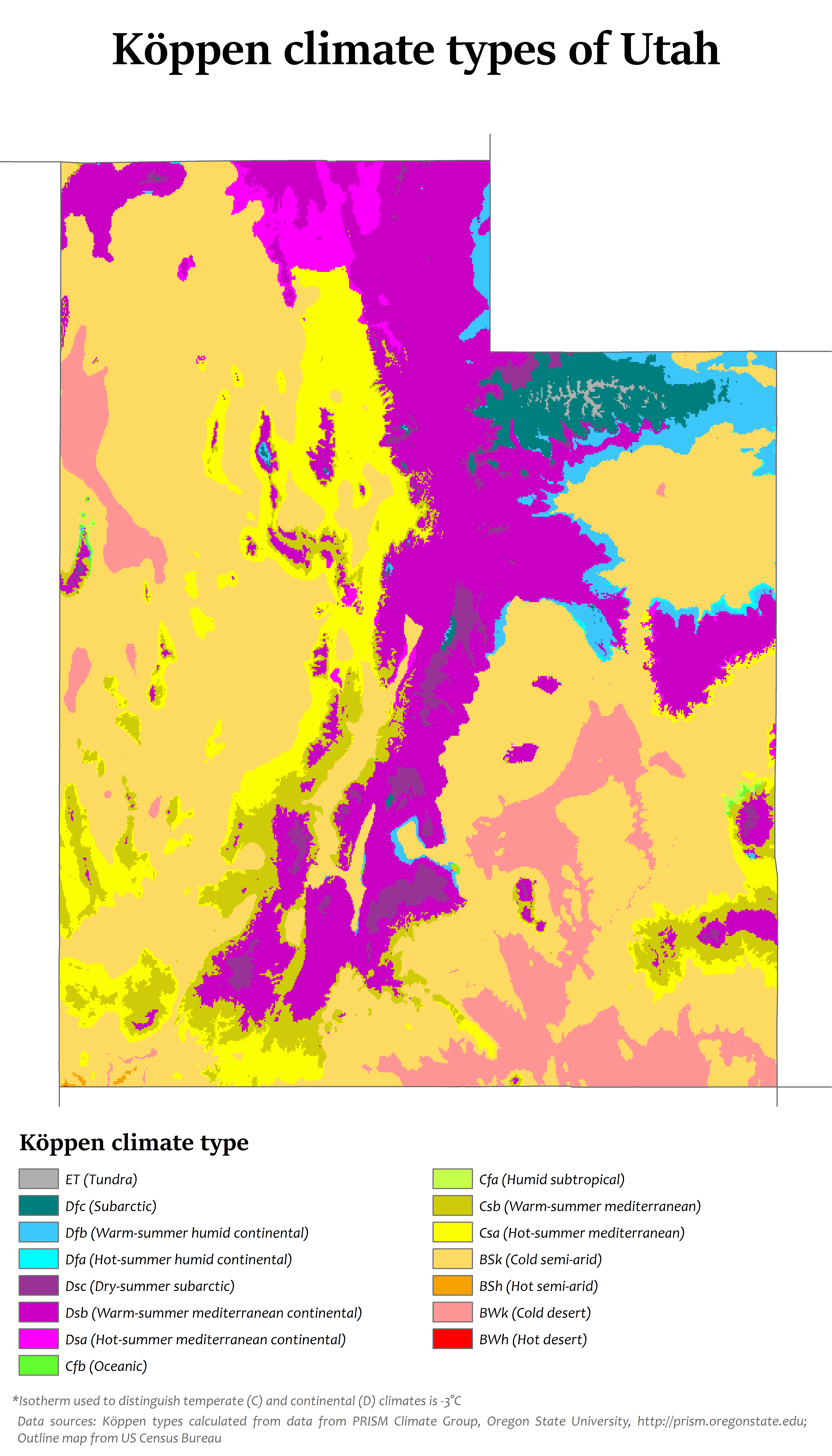
Köppen climate types in Utah, showing that the state is primarily cold semi-arid, with large patches of cold desert and a substantial corridor of warm-summer Mediterranean continental.

Climate change in Utah encompasses the effects of climate change, attributed to man-made increases in atmospheric carbon dioxide, in the U.S. state of Utah.

The United States Environmental Protection Agency reports that "Utah's climate is changing. The state has warmed about two degrees (F) in the last century. Throughout the western United States, heat waves are becoming more common, and snow is melting earlier in spring. In the coming decades, the changing climate is likely to decrease the flow of water in Utah's rivers, increase the frequency and intensity of wildfires, and decrease the productivity of ranches and farms". Another analysis found that Utah's temperature increase from 1970 to 2019 was the fifth highest in the nation, leading to an increasing intensity of wildfires. A changing climate was also reported as leading to increased flooding in Utah during winter months, followed by hot and dry summers, a cycle potentially harmful for agriculture.

== Snowpack ==
The warming climate causes more precipitation to fall as rain instead of snow. On top of that, there is more snow melting during the winter. This results in a decreased snowpack, which is the amount of snow that falls during the winter. Utah's snowpack has been decreasing since the 1950s, along with Wyoming and Colorado, which contribute some snowmelt to the Colorado and Green Rivers.

The diminishing snowpack can cause a shorter skiing season, along with other forms of winter recreation and tourism. There is the possibility that the tree line shifting, as high-altitude species like the subalpine fir become able to grow at higher elevations. This higher tree line would decrease the extent of alpine tundra ecosystems, resulting in some animal species becoming threatened.

== Water availability ==
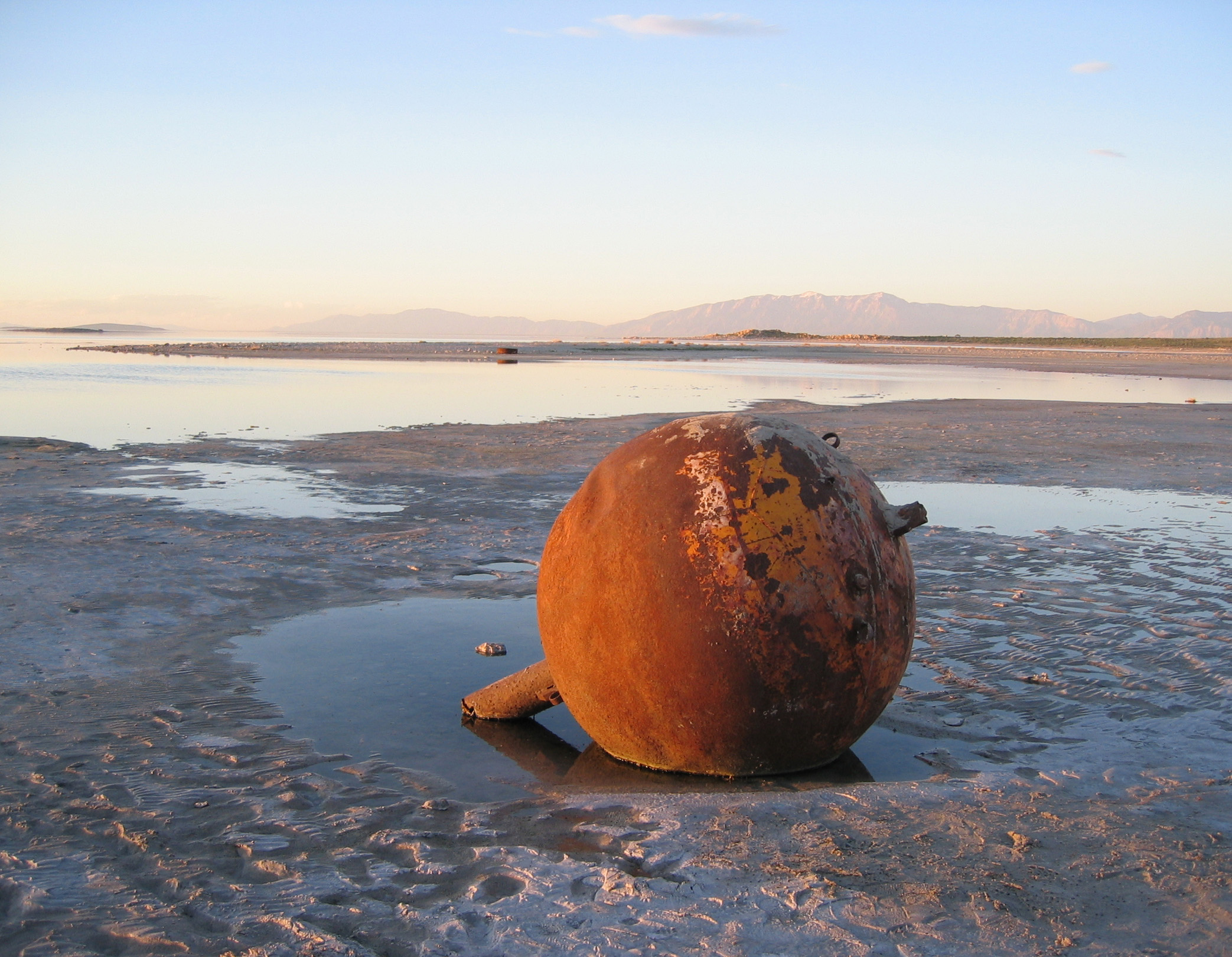
Low water, Great Salt Lake

With the changing climate, there will be an increased need for water as the supply shrinks. As temperatures rise, the rate of water evaporation into the air from soils, plants, and surface waters will increase. Therefore, soils are more likely to be drier across the state, resulting in the irrigated farmland needing water. But, at the same time, there will be less water will be avalible, as precipitation is unlikely to have the same increase as much as evaporation.

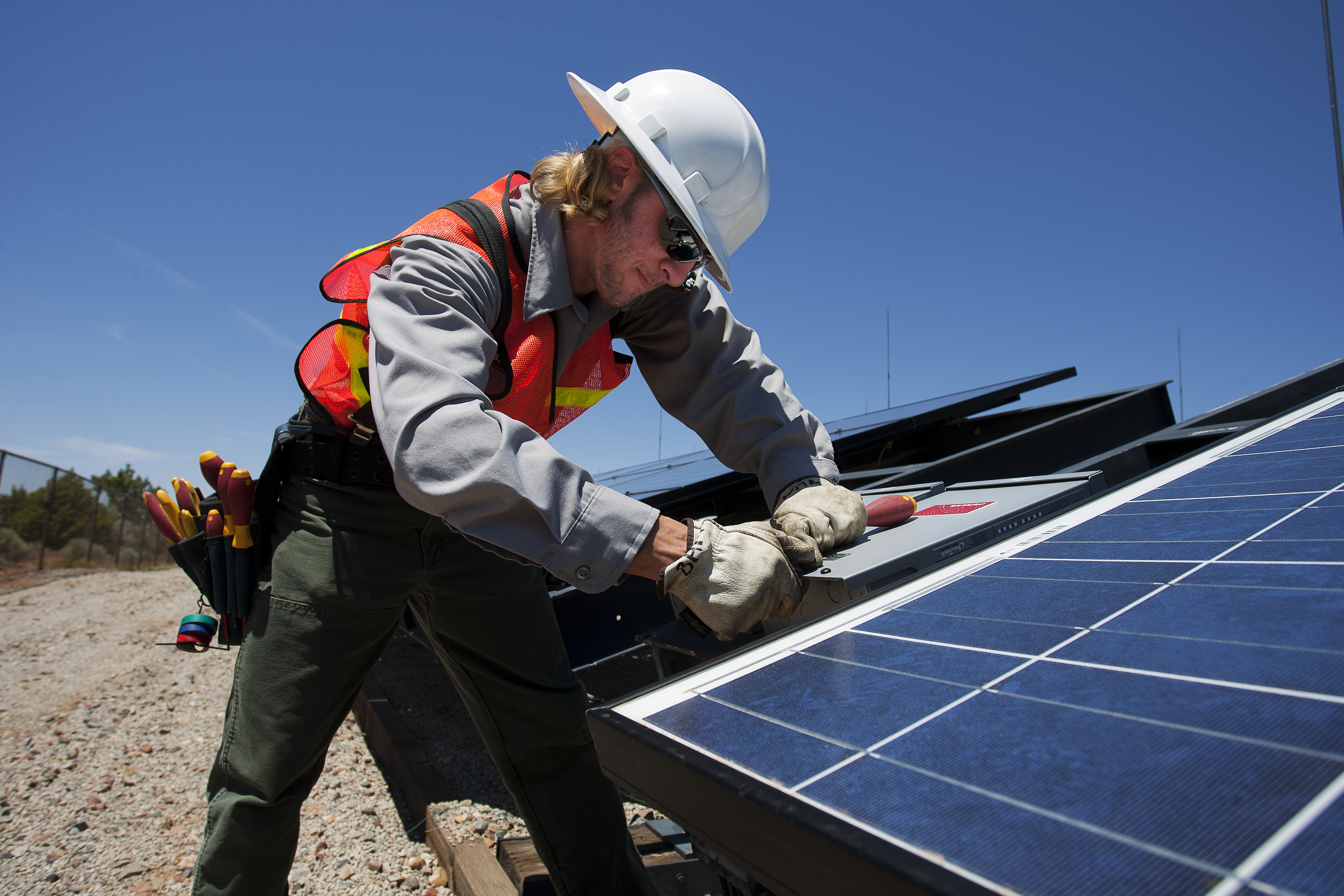
Solar installation, Natural Bridges

"The decline in snowpack could further limit the supply of water for some purposes. Mountain snowpacks are natural reservoirs. They collect the snow that falls during winter and release water when the snow melts during spring and summer. Over the past 50 years, snowpack has been melting earlier in the year. Dams capture most meltwater and retain it for use later in the year. But upstream of these reservoirs, less water is available during droughts for ecosystems, fish, water-based recreation, and landowners who draw water directly from a flowing river".

== Agriculture ==
"Increasing droughts and higher temperatures are likely to interfere with Utah's farms and cattle ranches. Hot temperatures threaten cows' health and cause them to eat less, grow more slowly, and produce less milk. Fire may also impair livestock operations. Reduced water availability would create challenges for ranches and irrigated farms, which account for 80 percent of the water used in the state".

== Wildfires and changing landscapes ==
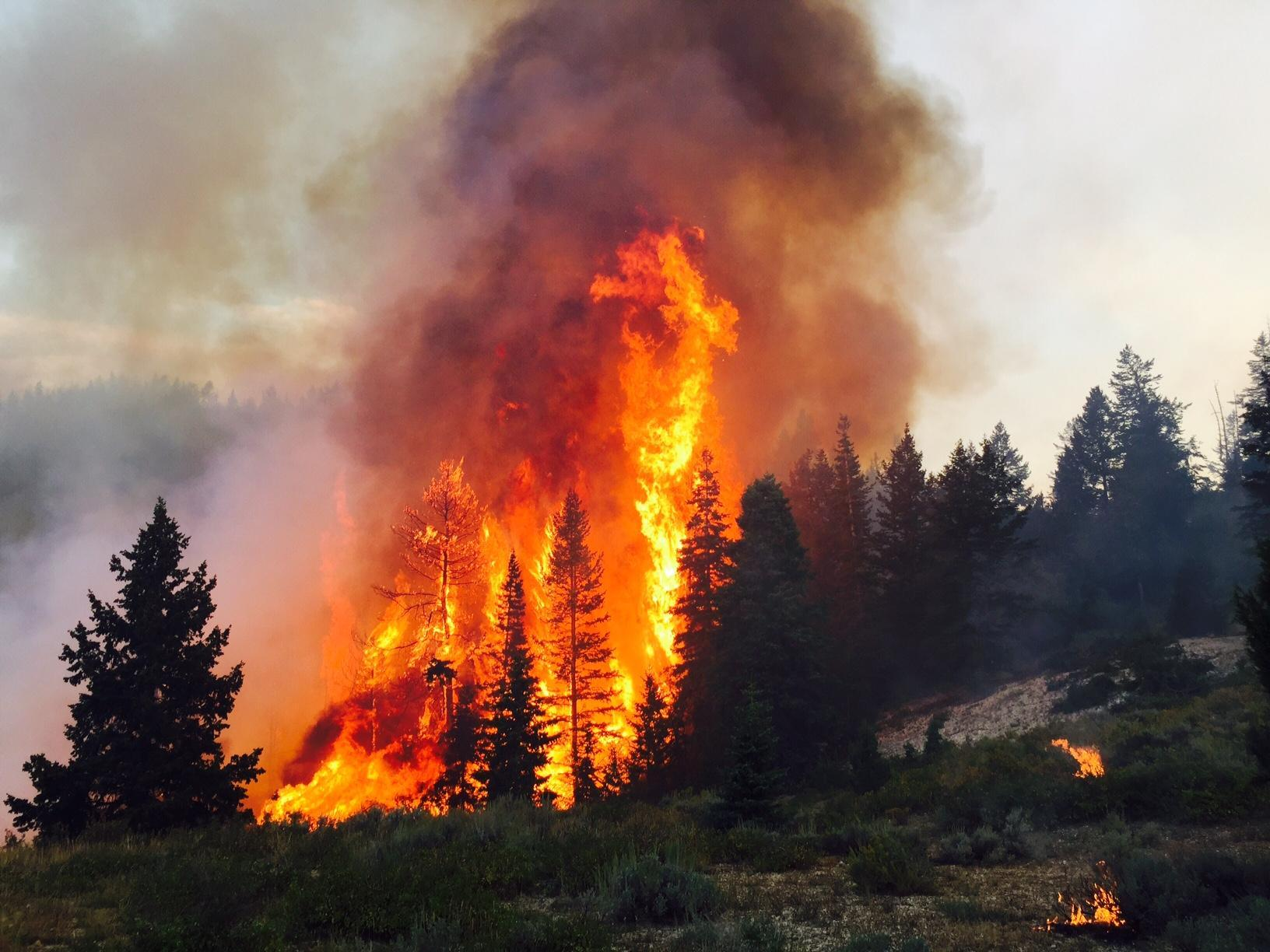
Wildfire, 2017

"Higher temperatures and drought are likely to increase the severity, frequency, and extent of wildfires, which could harm property, livelihoods, and human health. The Milford Flat Fire in 2007 was the largest wildfire ever recorded in Utah. Wildfire smoke can reduce air quality and increase medical visits for chest pains, respiratory problems, and heart problems".

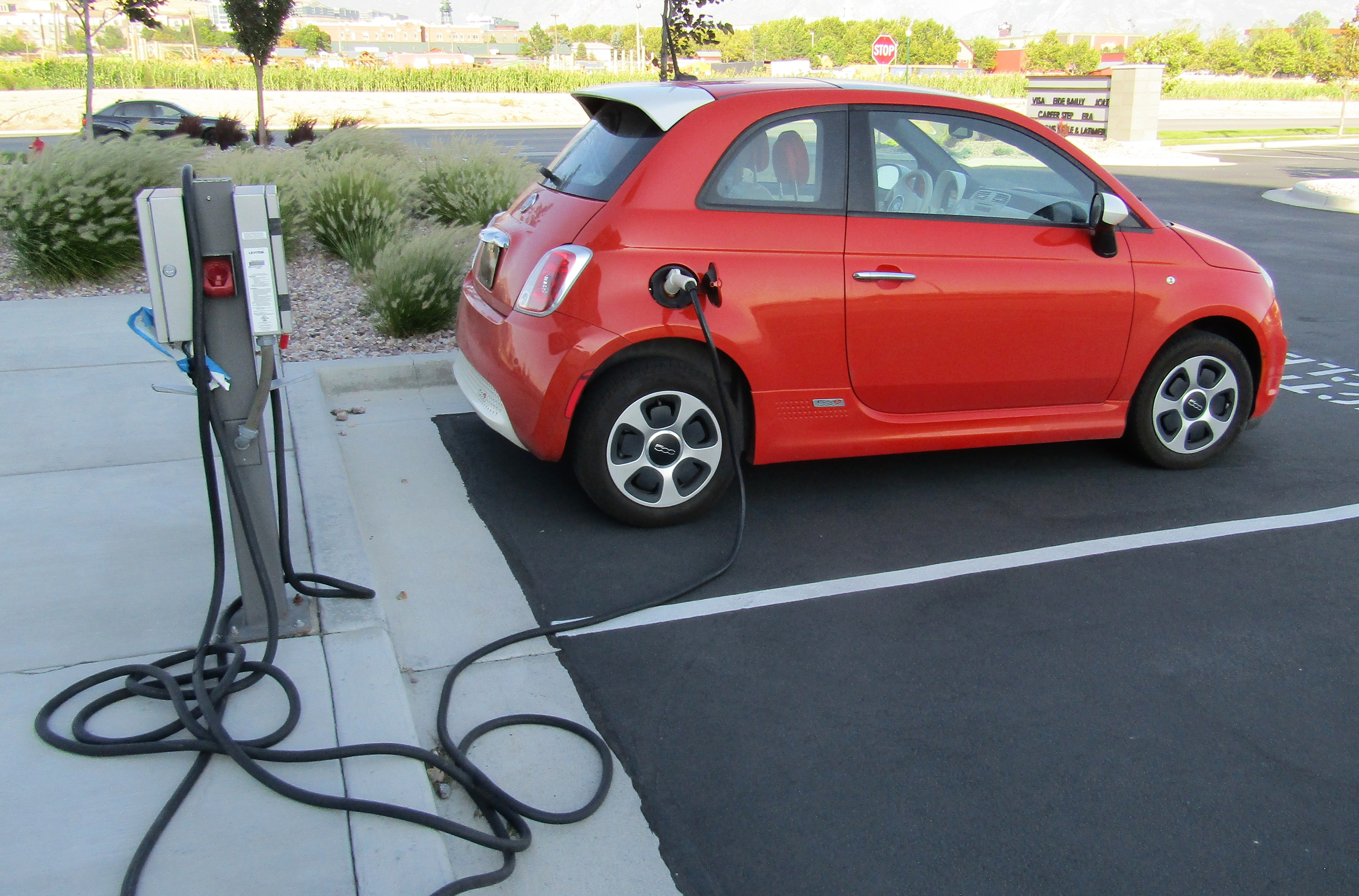
Electric vehicle charging station, Lehi

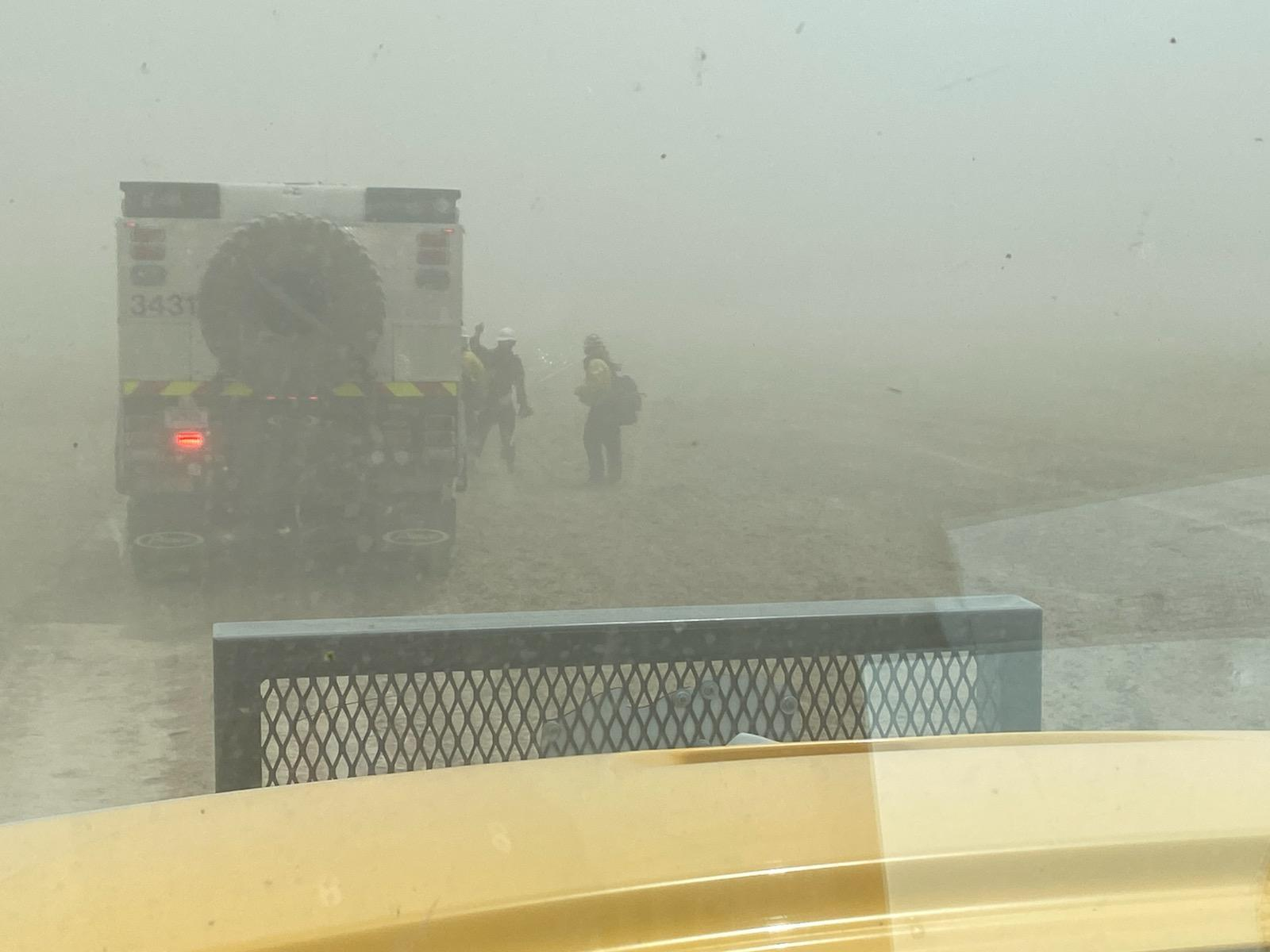
Air pollution, 2020 wildfire

"The combination of more fires and drier conditions may expand deserts and otherwise change parts of Utah’s landscape. Many plants and animals living in arid lands are already near the limits of what they can tolerate. Higher temperatures and a drier climate would generally extend the Great Basin desert to higher elevations and expand its geographic range. In some cases, native vegetation may persist and delay or prevent expansion of the desert. In other cases, fires or livestock grazing may accelerate the conversion of grassland to desert in response to the changing climate. For similar reasons, some forests may change to desert or grassland".

== Pests ==
"Warmer and drier conditions make forests more susceptible to pests. Drought reduces the ability of trees to mount a defense against attacks from pests such as bark beetles, which infested 50,000 acres of Utah's forests in 2012. Temperature controls the life cycle and winter mortality rates of many pests. With higher winter temperatures, some pests can persist year-round, and new pests and diseases may become established".

== See also ==
- Plug-in electric vehicles in Utah
