= Delila Richards Abbott =

American politician (1908–1998)

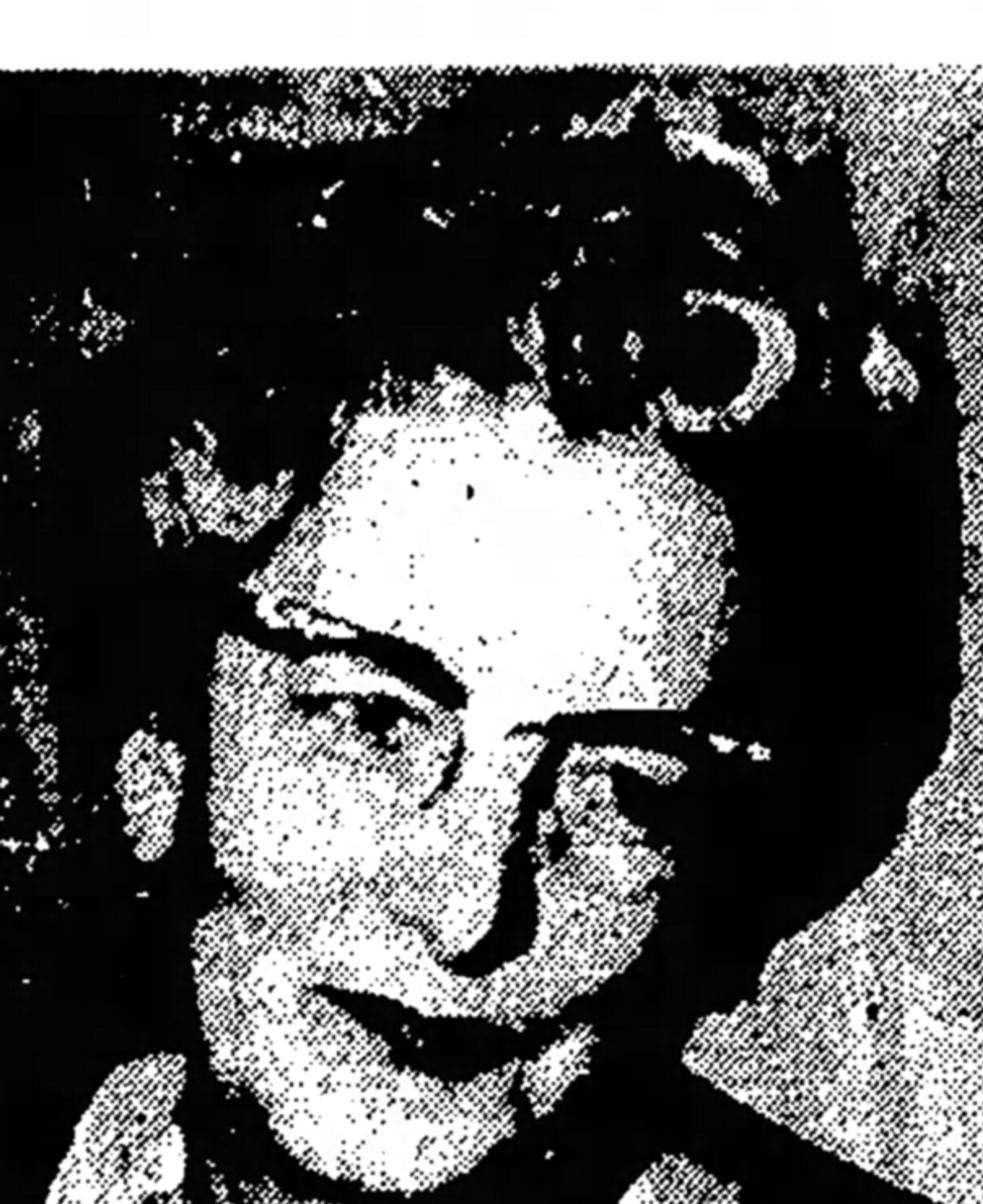
- Born: Delia Richards; November 4, 1908; West Jordan, Utah, U.S.
- Died: December 1, 1998 (aged 90); Salt Lake City, Utah, U.S.
- Occupation: Politician
- Spouse: Floyd A. Abbott
- Children: 1

Delila M. "Dee" Richards Abbott (November 4, 1908 – December 1, 1998) was an American politician and businesswoman. Throughout her life she was active in both local and national politics, and her accomplishments range from writing fiction novels to serving on the Defense Advisory Committee for Women. Abbott worked to bring more women into the public sphere, saying that "Women are a neglected resource. They are not sufficiently recognized and their full potential is not often developed". Abbott attended LDS Business College. Aside from the Defense Advisory Committee for Women, Abbott served on multiple committees and campaigns.

== Early life ==
Delila M. Richards was born on November 4, 1908, to John C. Richards and Clara Bacon in West Jordan, Utah. John was a carpenter, and he and Clara were both natives of West Jordan. Delila graduated from Jordan High School and went on to attend LDS Business College in Salt Lake City, Utah. On June 25, 1930, she married Floyd A. Abbott, also a life-time resident of West Jordan. The young couple initially moved to Spokane, Washington, but were forced back to Utah with the onset of the Great Depression. Floyd graduated from the University of Utah in 1928, worked as a pharmacist, and later joined the US Army during World War II. Five months after Floyd's departure, Delila gave birth to their son, Richard Abbott.

== Political career ==
Abbott began her political career in the late 1940s as a watcher at the polls and a member of the Salt Lake County Republican Central Committee. In 1954, she was elected as the Republican Party County Vice Chair (a position she would hold for the next six years), but also became involved at the state level. She served as the Supervisory Clerk for the Utah Senate in 1955 (and again in 1959) and the same year was invited to attend the Republican Women's National Conference in Washington, D.C., as the Utah State Conference chair. In 1957, she was elected to the Utah House of Representatives. Though she served for only one year, as a representative she acted as chair of both the Patronage and Rules Committees and was a member of several others.

Over the next 20 years, Abbott held and/or campaigned for numerous other local and state offices and organizational positions, some of which include:

- Republican Party Western Conference Representative (1958)
- Candidate for Salt Lake County Clerk (1958)
- Census Crew Leader (1961)
- Vice President of the Salt Lake City Women's Republican Club (1961–62)
- Committee Member of the National Council of Women of the United States (1963)
- Committee Member of the International Council of Women (1963)
- President of the Utah Order of Women Legislators (1976)

Of these offices, Abbott was the most influential during a three-year appointment as a member of the United States Defense Department's Defense Advisory Committee on Women in the Services beginning in 1960. The purpose of the committee was to advise the U.S. Defense Department on policies in regards to women in the Army, Navy, Air Force, and Marine Corps. The committee itself was considered the "top echelon" of women's civilian advisory committees, and its agenda and the identities of those making the appointments was kept a complete secret. As a member of the committee and the chair of the organization sub-committee, Abbott promoted many policy changes to assist the U.S. military in utilizing its women more effectively. Her achievements were many as committee chair, but she became popular in Utah for "bucking" regulation and fighting to allow servicewomen to wear more comfortable and stylish clothing—in particular, their skirts.
