= Archibald Gardner =

Mormon pioneer and businessman (1814–1902)

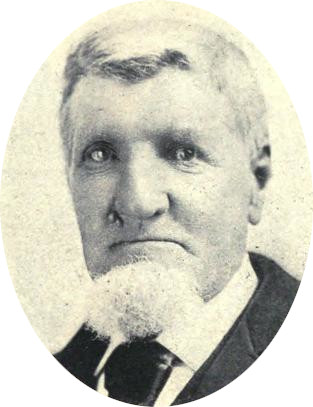
- Born: September 2, 1814; Kilsyth, Scotland
- Died: February 8, 1902 (aged 87); Salt Lake City, Utah
- Burial place: Salt Lake City Cemetery
- Occupations: Mill owner, Utah territorial legislator

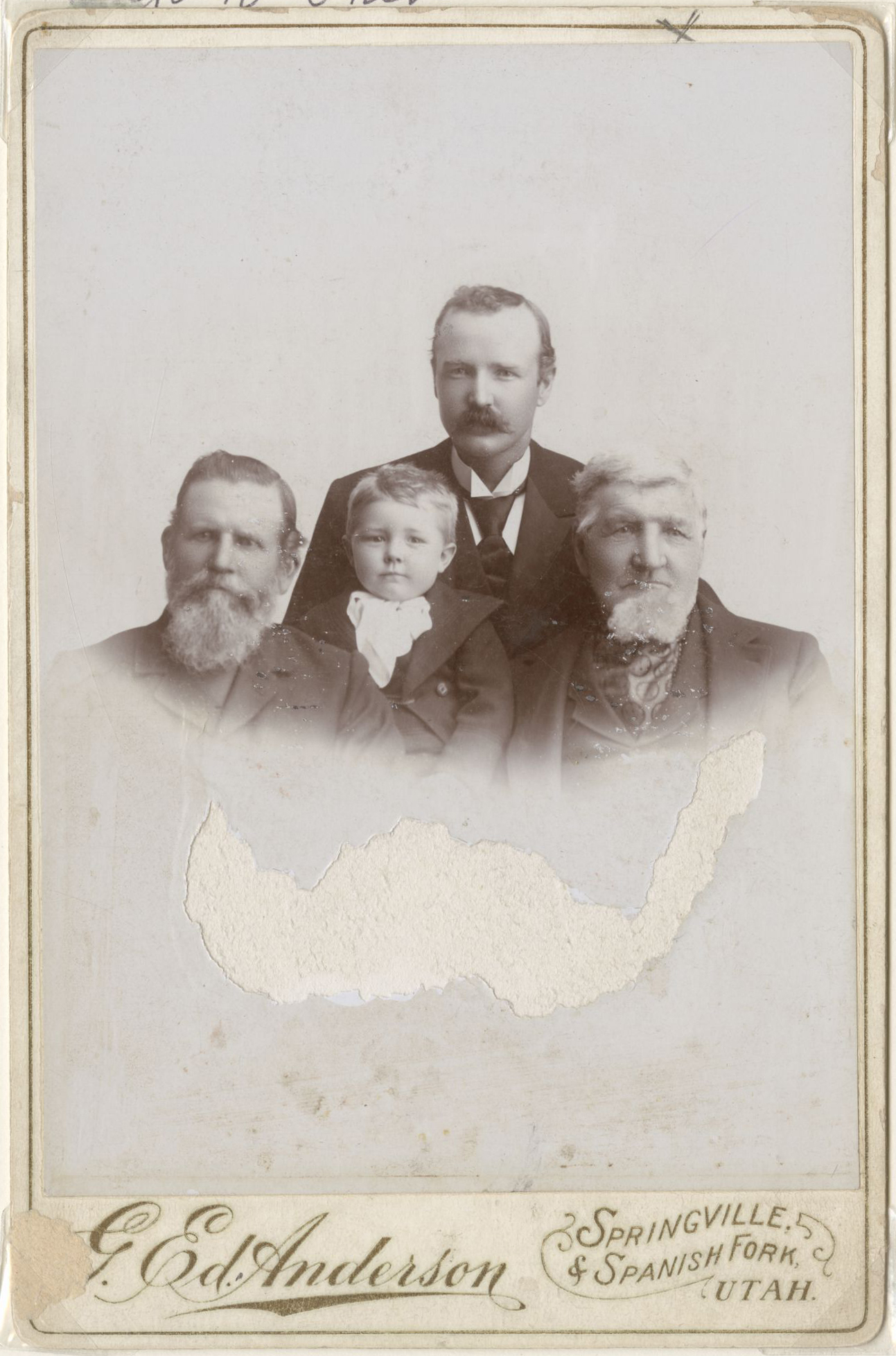
A 4-generation photograph of Neil Gardner, Vernon Neil Gardner, Neil Livingston Gardner, and Archibald Gardner

Archibald Gardner (September 2, 1814 – February 8, 1902) was a 19th-century pioneer and businessman who, with his knowledge of lumber- and grist mills, helped establish communities in Alvinston, Ontario; West Jordan, Utah; and Star Valley, Wyoming. In his lifetime Archibald built 36 gristmills and lumber mills — 23 in Utah, 6 in Canada, 5 in Wyoming, and 2 in Idaho — greatly benefiting the lives of those in the surrounding areas. Archibald also built hundreds of miles of canals to introduce the flow of water to the mills' apparatus.

Gardner was known as a businessman, father, practical engineer, millwright, polygamist, husband, and Bishop. In March of 1859, he was called as a local leader in the Church of Jesus Christ of Latter-day Saints (LDS Church) lasting for the next 32 years. Gardner also served two terms in the House of Representatives of the Utah territorial legislature beginning in 1878.

== Early life ==
Archibald was born on September 2, 1814, in Kilsyth, Scotland. His father, Robert Gardner, operated Black Bull Inn Tavern and rented Gamill Mill where Archibald was born. Robert Gardner with his wife Margaret Calinder had nine children, five of which survived — William, Mary, Janet, Archibald, and Robert. During the unrest in Scotland, Robert Gardner was thought to be a rebel and thrown in prison. He was later released when no traitorous evidence could be found. Wanting nothing to do with the up rise, Robert Gardner immigrated to Upper Canada (near Port Dalhousie) in 1822 with children William and Mary; the next year the rest of the family joined him. At age 17, Archibald built his first mill by following the direction of his father. Six years later Archibald went on his own, moving to Brooke, Kent County, Western District, Canada (later named Alvinston). In Alvinston, Ontario, he built a gristmill in 1837 on the east end of the sixth concession of Brooke township. As was common to the technology of the period, Archibald Gardner's gristmills were "built without nails. Wooden pins and mortises were used instead. All shafts, bearings, cog wheels, etc. were of wood..." Gristmills often formed the economic center of a community, producing flour to bake bread. The gristmill area was on a hill that faces Alvinston. The area was called Gardner's Mill for several years. Archibald also built a saw mill in this area to produce shingles.

On February 18, 1839, Archibald Gardner married Margaret Livingston in Brooke. Archibald Gardner was baptized into the Church of Jesus Christ of Latter Day Saints in April 1845. Under business pressure and persecution, based on his joining the LDS Church, Gardner sold his Alvinston area mills at a reduced price and sent his family to America. Archibald fled Canada in 1846 after his affairs were in order. He was chased by the local sheriff and posse and forced to cross a dangerous river, St. Clair River by Lake Huron. Knowing his fate if he stayed in Canada, Archibald crossed the cold, icy river resulting in a miraculous escape to the United States.

== Mormon Pioneer ==
In St. Louis, Missouri, Archibald joined his family before traveling to Nauvoo, Illinois, only to find the Latter Day Saints driven out. After replenishing their packs, the Gardner family headed to Winter Quarters where Archibald's daughter Janet died (October 10, 1846). Two years before on the same day, Archibald's son (also named Archibald) died of the same illness at the same age.

In June 1847, the family started their trek to the Rocky Mountains in Bishop Hunter's Company, arriving October 1, 1847. John Taylor, at the time a member of the Quorum of the Twelve Apostles, also traveled in Archibald's company.

== Life in the West ==
=== Mills and canals ===
Following a failed attempt to build a sawmill in Warm Springs, Archibald moved to Millcreek in 1848 with hopes that the strong water flow could sustain the fall harvest. Family records also claim the Gardeners cut the first piece of lumber in the Salt Lake Valley.

In order to provide water-fueled power for their mills, Archibald Gardner and his brother Robert began planning and digging a two-and-a-half-mile millrace in West Jordan. The canal started at the Jordan river, extending into what is now Taylorsville. Following the construction of their first grist mill in 1858, local business boomed and Gardner Mill inspired the growth of other industries, including blacksmith shops, logging and hauling operations, woolen and carding mills, a tannery, several stores, a shoe shop, and later a broom factory. In total, Archibald directly built or contributed to 23 mills in Utah, with several selling its products to Camp Floyd and Fort Douglas.

=== The Salt Lake Temple ===
Under the direction of Brigham Young, the President of the Church at the time, the foundation for the Latter-day Saint Salt Lake Temple was laid in 1855, but cracks and defects soon put construction to a halt. After he and his advisers were informed the foundation wouldn't sustain the weight of the temple, President Young sought revelation and proclaimed "Here, I shall remain until the Lord reveals to me what I should do next". Seeing Archibald on-site, Young requested "Bishop, sit down" and explained of the issue and asked him what could be done. After listening, Archibald calmly explained "the trouble has arisen through the use of too much mortar. This time, instead of using mortar, have each and all of the stones in the entire building cut to exact measurement and place stone upon stone with precise fittings. This will prevent cracking, settling or spreading in any way". Upon hearing this, President Brigham Young exclaimed "Brother Gardner, you are right. That is my revelation". The Salt Lake City LDS temple has stood since, but precautionary renovations for seismic protection began in December 2019. Clarence Gardner, son of Archibald Gardner believes his instructions were a revelation from God, "Because he [Archibald] had spent his life working out problems along practical lines. His past experiences made him equal to the occasion."

=== Mining business ===
In 1863, Archibald Gardner unexpectedly became part of the mining business. While logging under the direction of Archibald, George B. Ogilvie discovered an "attractive piece of ore". He sent it off to General Patrick Edward Connor at Fort Douglas, and the ore was discovered to have traces of silver. Claimants held a meeting and organized the Jordan Silver Mining District on September 17, 1863. Each individual (including Archibald Gardner and Patrick Edward Connor) was given one share, except for George B. Ogilvie, who was given two shares as the discoverer. Archibald Gardner was elected the first recorder for the district. The Jordan Silver Mining District eventually became the West Mountain Mining District. Today it is known as the Bingham Copper Mine owned by Kennecott.

=== As a polygamist ===
Archibald became a polygamist in 1849 by the requests of Brigham Young. His first wife Margaret Livingston intended to divorce him, believing that polygamy was a sinful act until Brigham Young spoke with her. The last of Archibald's 11 wives was illegal, taking place after the 1862 Morrill Anti-Bigamy Act. Due to an unsettled polygamist status after 1882, Archibald was chased by federal agents enforcing anti-polygamy laws. In 1886 he made a trip to California to visit his brother William. On his last trip evading federal agents, Archibald visited Mexico, and his brother Robert in southern Utah. In 1889 Archibald established a home in Afton, Wyoming (Star Valley). In Star Valley he built additional mills and lived near and with two wives, Laura Althea Thompson, his fifth wife, and Mary Larson, his 11th wife, and near or with several of his 48 children. When Althea died in Afton in 1899, Archibald buried her in the Salt Lake cemetery's Gardner family plot. Archibald stayed on in Utah building another gristmill in Spanish Fork. At 86, Archibald Gardner was taken to St. Mark's Hospital for an operation on a strangulated hernia. After the operation he was heard to say, "Here I go to solve the great mystery". Archibald Gardner died in the early morning of February 8, 1902, and is buried in the Salt Lake City Cemetery.

== Wives of Archibald Gardner ==
From Life of Archibald Gardner: Utah Pioneer of 1847

- Margaret Livingston (1818-1893)
- Abigail Sprague Bradford (1813-1879)
- Mary Ann Bradford (1831-1867)
- Laura Althea Thompson (1834-1899)
- Elizabeth Lewis Raglin (1832-1879)
- Sarah Jane Park (1834-1916)
- Serena Gahrsen Evensen (1822-1911)
- Harriet Armitage Larter (1830-1866)
- Elizabeth Dowding (1850-1921)
- Mary Larsen (1850-1921)
- Sarah Jane Hamilton (1842-1924) (Divorced in 1861)

Four of Gardner's wives were under 18 at the time he married them. Gardner was 34 years old when he married Mary Ann Bradford, who was then 17. Two years later he married 16-year-old Laura Althea Thompson. He was 42 when he married Sarah Jane Hamilton and 52 when he married Elizabeth Dowding, each of whom was 15 years of age at the time of the wedding.

== Legacy ==
Archibald Gardner had 11 wives and 48 children. Gardner's life is memorialized by a monument in Afton, Wyoming, and a restored gristmill at Gardner Village. The site where Archibald built his original flour mill in West Jordan, Utah, is now known as Gardner Village and features a collection of other early pioneer homes that now house shops and a restaurant dedicated to him called Archibald's Restaurant.

Leland Mills, one of the last mills Gardner built when he was alive, still operates today in Spanish Fork, Utah.

Olympic Greco-Roman wrestling gold medalist Rulon Gardner is the great-great-grandson of Archibald Gardner. A new headstone was dedicated for Archibald Gardner after a 1990 Afton, Wyoming, family reunion when 2,000 of his 20,000 descendants attended.
