= Mountain America Credit Union =

Credit union in Utah, United States

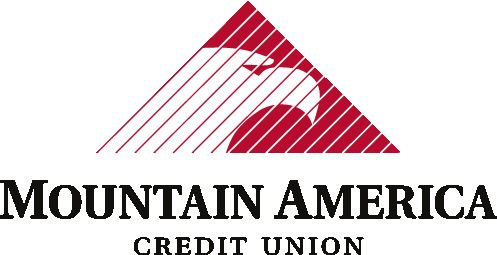
- Formerly: Salt Lake Telephone Employees' Credit Union, Utah Telephone Employees Credit Union (UTELCU)
- Type: Credit union
- Industry: Financial services
- Founded: 1936; 90 years ago
- Headquarters: Sandy, Utah; United States
- Area served: Western United States
- Key people: Sterling Nielsen, President/CEO; H. Floyd Tanner, Chairman
- Products: Savings; checking; consumer loans; mortgages; credit cards; online banking
- Total assets: $21.9 billion (March 2026)
- Website: www.macu.com

Mountain America Credit Union is a federally chartered credit union headquartered in Sandy, Utah, and regulated by the National Credit Union Administration (NCUA). Mountain America is the second-largest credit union in Utah and the seventh-largest nationwide by total assets. As of April 2026, Mountain America held approximately $22.8 billion in assets, with more than 1.4 million members and over 100 branches.

== History ==
The credit union was founded to serve employees of the Mountain States Telephone and Telegraph Company, incorporating in June 1936 under the name Salt Lake Telephone Employees' Credit Union. The organization later became known as the Utah Telephone Employees Credit Union (UTELCU).

In 1984, UTELCU acquired the Postal Credit Union and adopted the name Mountain America Credit Union. The credit union expanded further in 1988 through a merger with Utah State Credit Union (formerly the Utah State Employees Credit Union).

After a 5% tax was proposed on the three largest credit unions in Utah, Mountain America converted from a state-chartered to a federally chartered credit union in 2003, becoming Mountain America Federal Credit Union.

In 2008, the credit union absorbed Salt Lake City Credit Union, which became a division of Mountain America following regulatory approval. The organization has expanded operations into multiple Western states. Mountain America exited the New Mexico market in 2024 by selling its Albuquerque branch operations to Sunward Federal Credit Union.

== Operations ==
Mountain America operates more than 100 branches across several western states, including Utah, Idaho, Montana, Nevada, and Arizona.

The credit union has also participated in industry discussions around proposed changes to federal limits on member business lending. Mountain America has been cited in industry reporting as one of several large credit unions supporting legislative proposals to raise federal limits on member business lending.

== Sponsorships ==
In 2023, Arizona State University's Sun Devil Stadium was renamed Mountain America Stadium, following a naming rights deal between ASU and the credit union. The 15-year agreement was estimated to be worth more than $50M over the life of the deal. Mountain America’s naming rights agreement expanded the credit union’s existing partnership with Arizona State, with naming rights to the community ice facility connected to Mullett Arena.
