= Plug-in electric vehicles in Utah =

As of 2021, there were about 11,000 electric vehicles in Utah.

In 2021, the state was ranked by Bumper.com as the second-best state in the country for electric vehicle ownership, behind Washington.

== Government policy ==
In February 2022, lawmakers in the state legislature proposed a bill to introduce a road-usage fee for electric vehicles, in order to compensate for the lack of revenue from gasoline taxes. Governor Spencer Cox signed the bill into law in March.

There have been privacy concerns with regard to the state government tracking electric vehicles.

== Charging station ==
As of 2021, there were about 860 public charging station locations in Utah with about 1,800 charging ports, 195 of which were DC charging ports.

The Infrastructure Investment and Jobs Act, signed into law in November 2021, allocates US$50 million to charging stations in Utah.

== By region ==
=== Salt Lake City ===
In 2021, Salt Lake City was ranked by the website Auto Insurance Quote as the best city in the United States for electric car ownership.
