= West Jordan, Utah =

City in Utah, United States

- City
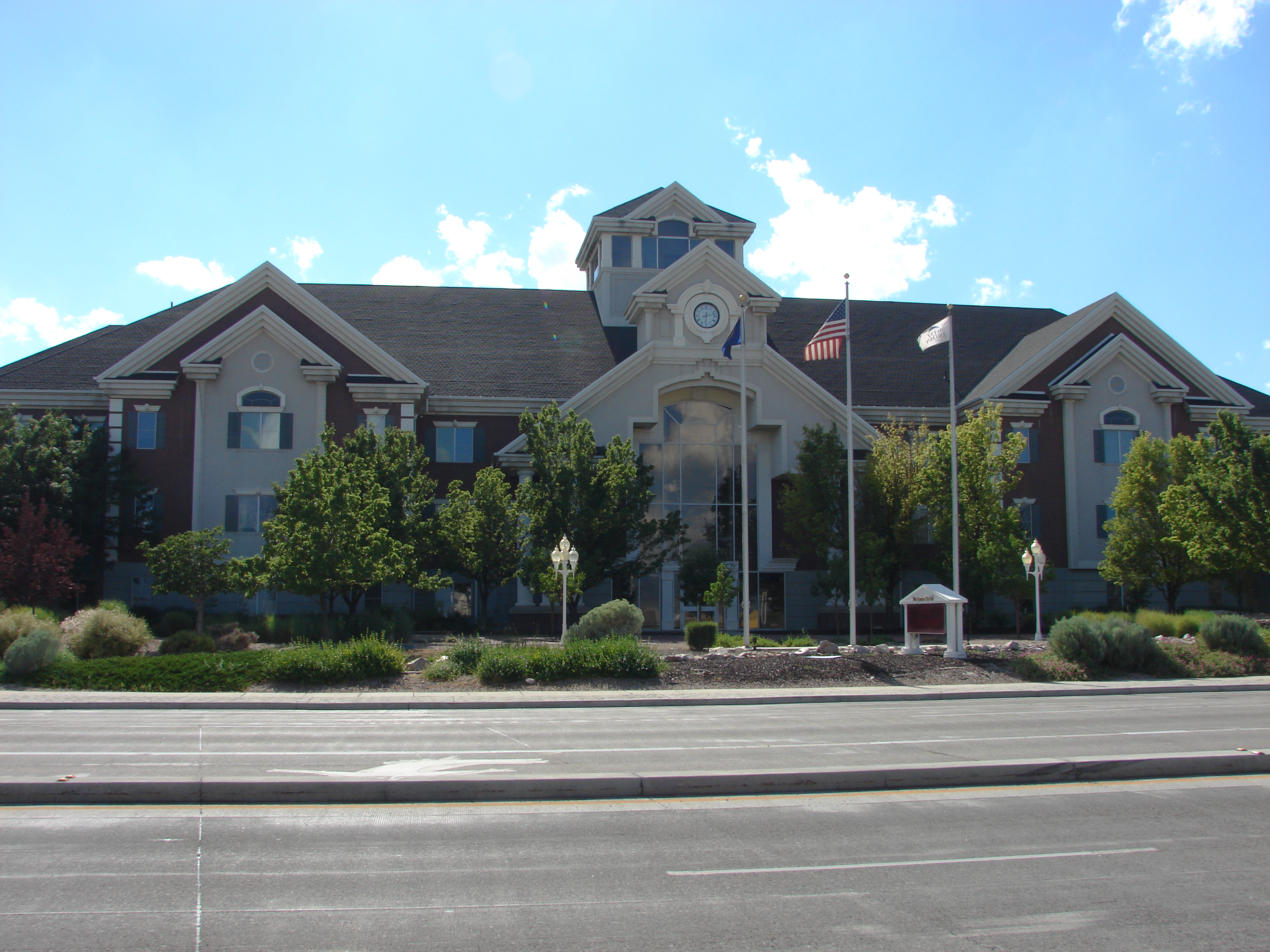
- West Jordan City Hall

- Location in Salt Lake County and the state of Utah
- Coordinates: 40°36′23″N 111°58′34″W
- Country: United States
- State: Utah
- County: Salt Lake
- Settled: 1848
- Incorporated: 1941
- Named for: Jordan River

Government
  - Mayor: Dirk Burton

Area
  - Total: 32.33 sq mi (83.73 km^{2})
  - Land: 32.33 sq mi (83.73 km^{2})
  - Water: 0 sq mi (0.00 km^{2})
- Elevation: 4,373 ft (1,333 m)

Population (2020)
  - Total: 116,961
  - Density: 3,617.9/sq mi (1,396.88/km^{2})
- Time zone: UTC−7 (Mountain (MST))
  - Summer (DST): UTC−6 (MDT)
- ZIP codes: 84081, 84084, 84088
- Area codes: 385, 801
- FIPS code: 49-82950
- GNIS feature ID: 1434086
- Website: westjordan.utah.gov

West Jordan is a city in Salt Lake County, Utah, United States. It is a suburb of Salt Lake City. According to the 2020 Census, the city had a population of 116,961, placing it as the third most populous in the state. The city occupies the southwest end of the Salt Lake Valley at an elevation of 4,330 feet (1,320 m). Named after the nearby Jordan River, the limits of the city begin on the river's western bank and end in the eastern foothills of the Oquirrh Mountains, where Kennecott Copper Mine, the world's largest man-made excavation, is located.

Settled in the mid-19th century, the city has developed into its own regional center. As of 2012, the city has four major retail centers; with Jordan Landing being one of the largest mixed-use planned developments in the Intermountain West. Companies headquartered in West Jordan include Mountain America Credit Union, Lynco Sales & Service, SME Steel, and Cyprus Credit Union. The city has one major hospital, Jordan Valley Medical Center, and a campus of Salt Lake Community College.

City landmarks include Gardner Village, established in 1850, and South Valley Regional Airport, formerly known as "Salt Lake Airport #2". The airport serves general aviation operations as well as a base for the 211th Aviation Regiment of the Utah Army National Guard flying Apache and Black Hawk helicopters.

== History ==
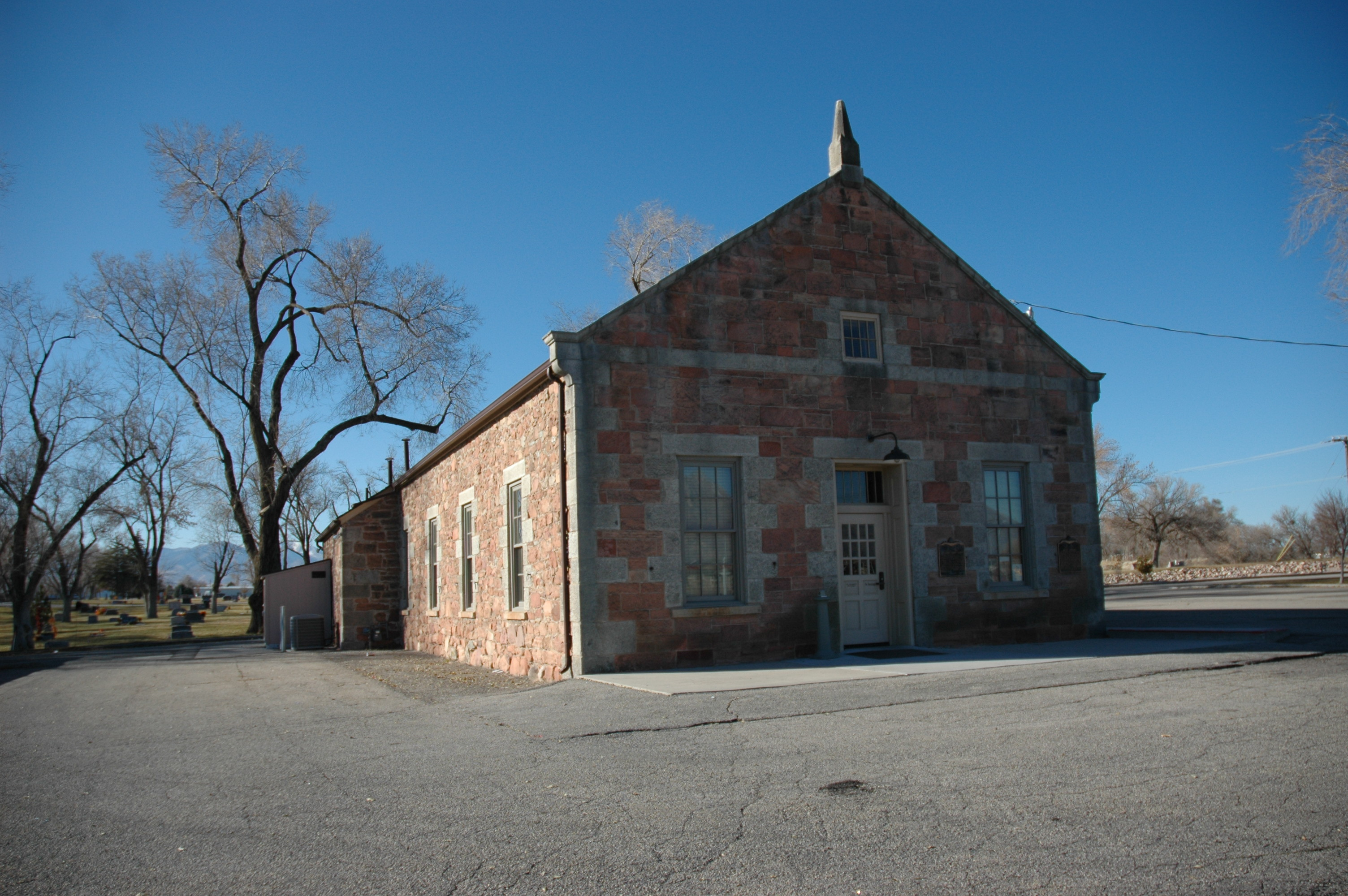
The historic West Jordan Ward Meeting House of the LDS Church. It is now the Museum of the Daughters of Utah Pioneers.

West Jordan received its name from Mormon settlers who entered the Salt Lake Valley in 1847 under the leadership of their prophet, Brigham Young. These first European-Americans named the river flowing west of their first settlement, Salt Lake City, the Western Jordan, a reference to the River Jordan in Jordan. The name was later simplified to "Jordan River". Like its Middle Eastern namesake, the Jordan River flows from a fresh water lake (Utah Lake) to an inland salt sea (Great Salt Lake). West Jordan was founded around 1849 on the western banks of the Jordan River.

One of the first sawmills in the area was built in 1850 in the city by Archibald Gardner. Gardner was a devout Mormon whose legacy can still be seen in modern West Jordan. His collection of mills and houses, now historic, have been renovated into a specialty shopping district known as Gardner Village.

Early West Jordan relied primarily on agriculture, mills, and mining activity to form the base of its economy. The first leather tannery west of the Mississippi River was constructed in the city in 1851.

Today, West Jordan is one of the fastest-growing cities in Utah. The population grew from 4,221 in 1970 to 27,327 in 1980, 42,892 in 1990, and 68,336 in 2000, reaching 103,712 according to the 2010 Census. Sears chose the city as its first Sears Grand location, a new store concept, which opened its doors in 2003 at the Jordan Landing shopping center. Transportation issues along with school overcrowding are the city's top concerns as it attempts to deal with rapid population growth.

Current major construction projects include a new main campus for the Salt Lake Community College, the expansion of Jordan Valley Hospital, and Midvale's current transit-oriented development on the east border in the Jordan River bed.

West Jordan has become a regional center for government services. The Veteran’s Park Area includes City Hall, the Thomas Rees Justice Center that houses the West Jordan Police and Justice Court. Also included in the area is Fire Station 52, the Salt Lake County Health Department, Utah Third District Court, the Salt Lake District Attorney’s Office, and the Viridian Events Center and Library. The Park also includes a rodeo arena, a senior center (operated by Salt Lake County), and Gene Fuller Recreation Center, name after former boxing great Gene Fullmer.

== Geography ==
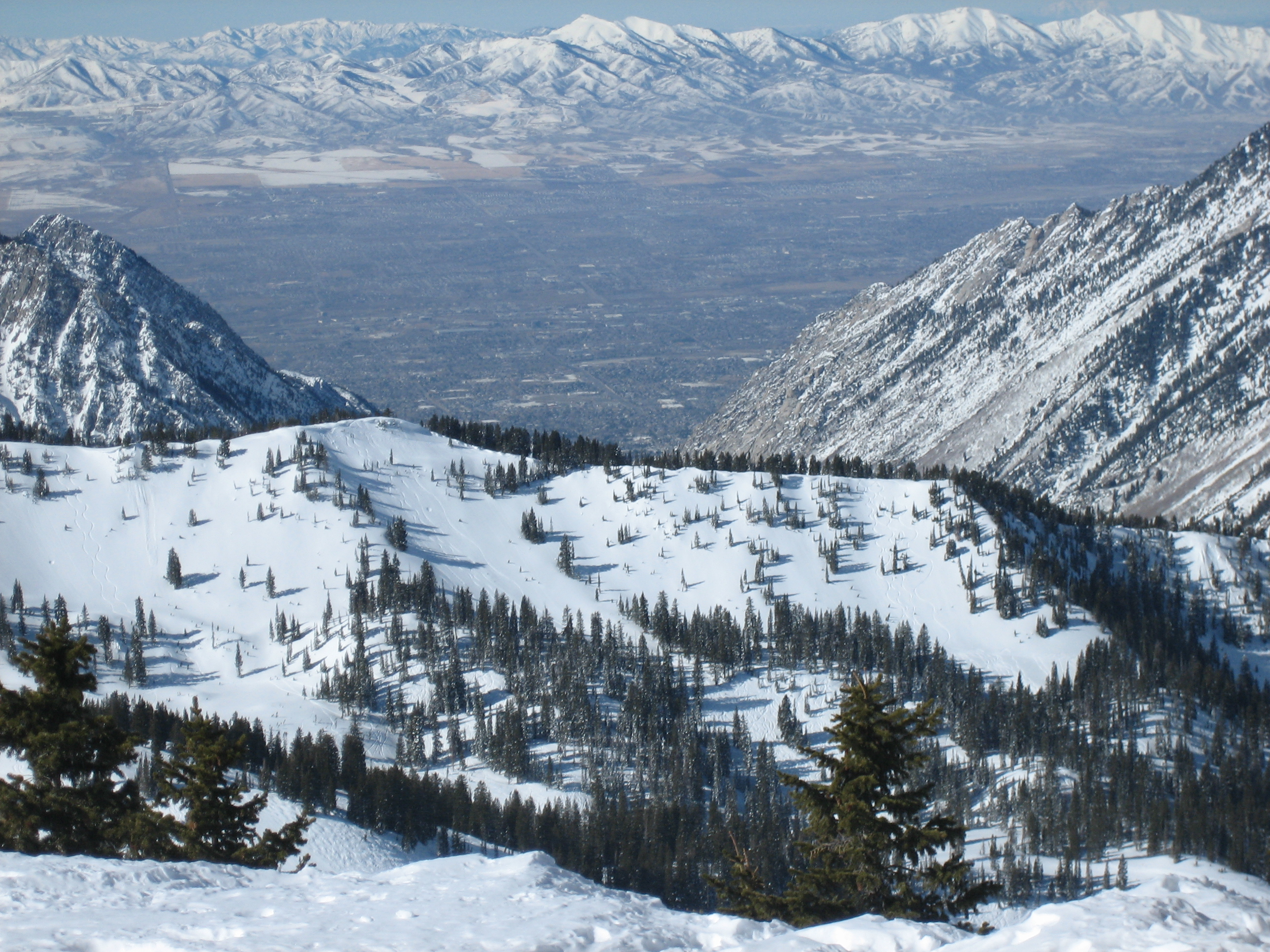
Looking down and westward at the city and the Oquirrh Mountains

According to the United States Census Bureau, the city has a total area of 30.9 square miles (80.0 km^{2}), all land.

West Jordan is bordered on the west by the Oquirrh Mountains and on the east by the Jordan River. The western neighborhoods of Welby, Copper Hills, and Jordan Hills are rapidly growing regions located along the lower slopes of the eastern Oquirrh Mountains. The fastest development is currently taking place between 4800 West and State Route 111, a highway that traverses the slopes of the Oquirrh Mountains.

The city lies approximately 18 miles (29 km) southwest of downtown Salt Lake City. The city is bordered on the north by Taylorsville and Kearns, on the south by South Jordan, on the east by Sandy, Murray and Midvale, on the west by Copperton, and on the extreme northwestern corner by West Valley City.

== Government ==
Elected officials of West Jordan as of 2025
Official	Position	Term
Dirk Burton	Mayor	2020–2028
City council members
Annette Harris	At-Large	2026–2030
Jessica Wignall	At-Large	2026–2030
Kayleen Whitelock	At-Large	2018–2030
Chad Lamb	District 1	2024–2028
Bob Bedore	District 2	2024–2028
Zach Jacob	District 3	2016–2028
Kent Shelton	District 4	2024–2028

West Jordan was incorporated on January 10, 1941. In November 2017, the citizens voted to change the form of government to a council-mayor form beginning at noon on January 6, 2020. The city council is composed of seven individuals: a chair, vice-chair and five council members. In 2024, the City Council adopted a leadership rotation schedule, changing the chair, vice-chair, and past-chair every six months. The rotation cycles every January 1 and July 1, respectively, with the action being certified in the first possible council meeting thereafter. The council chair presides at city council meetings. The mayor is the chief executive of the city and appoints a chief administrative officer to oversee the functions of the city. The city council provides policy and direction for the city. The mayor implements the council's policies and can exercise veto power unless the council uses its veto override power which requires 5 votes.

The mayor and city council members are elected to four-year terms. Four city council members are elected from four districts within the city, while the other three are elected at-large or citywide. The mayor and the four city council members representing a district are elected at the same time while the three at-large council members are elected during an offset two year election cycle. Thus ensuring that at least one city official representing the whole city is voted on every two years. All terms begin on January 1 following their respective election. Dirk Burton is the mayor.

== Demographics ==
Historical population
Census	Pop.	Note	%±
1950	2,107		—
1960	3,009		42.8%
1970	4,221		40.3%
1980	27,192		544.2%
1990	42,892		57.7%
2000	68,336		59.3%
2010	103,712		51.8%
2020	116,961		12.8%
U.S. Decennial Census, 2020

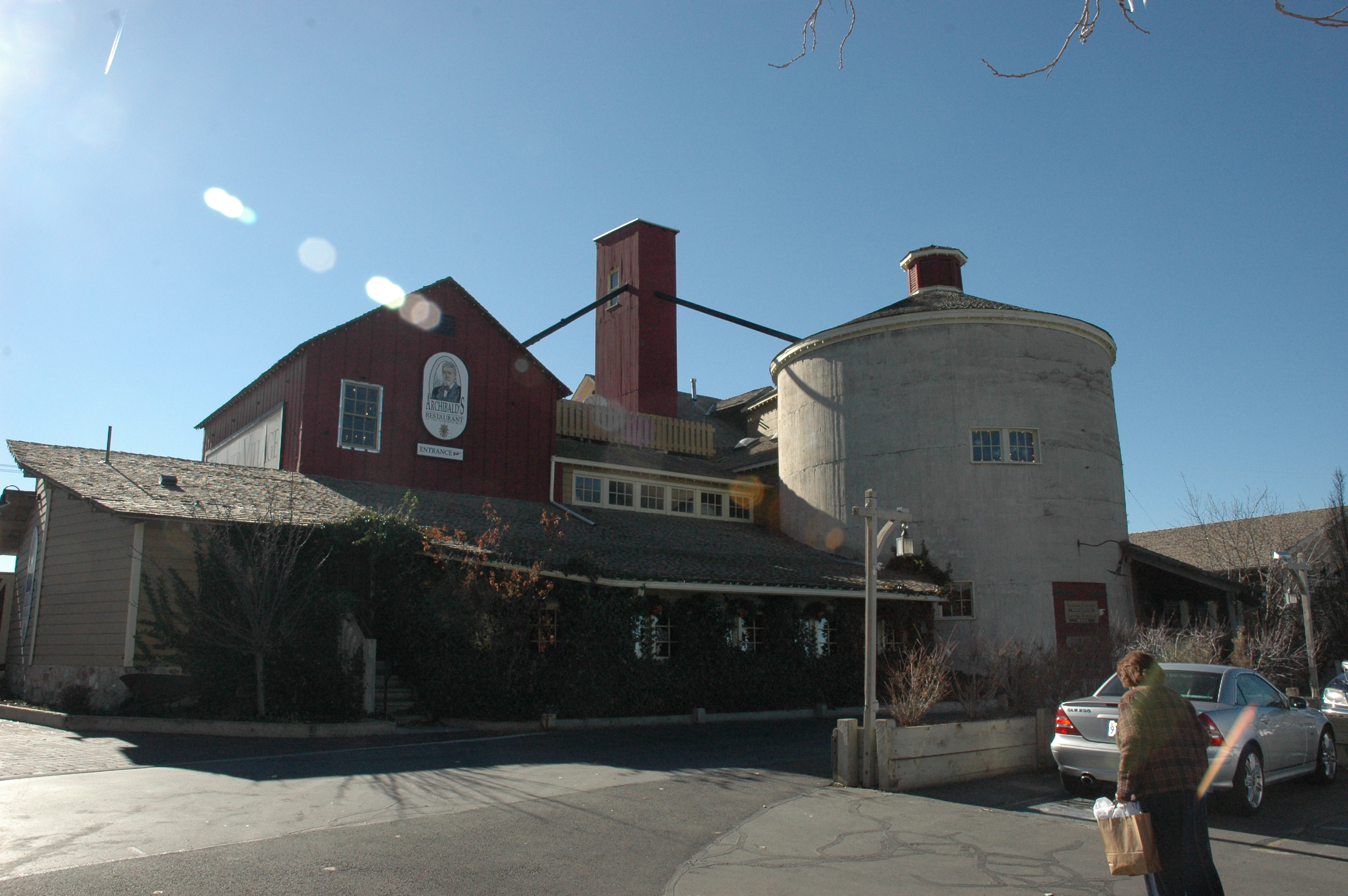
The historic Gardner Mill is now part of the Gardner Village shopping center.

=== Racial and ethnic composition ===
West Jordan, Utah – Racial and ethnic composition Note: the US Census treats Hispanic/Latino as an ethnic category. This table excludes Latinos from the racial categories and assigns them to a separate category. Hispanics/Latinos may be of any race.
Race / Ethnicity (NH = Non-Hispanic)	Pop. 2000	Pop. 2010	Pop. 2020	% 2000	% 2010	% 2020
White alone (NH)	57,688	77,360	77,760	84.42%	74.59%	66.48%
Black or African American alone (NH)	396	855	1,363	0.58%	0.82%	1.17%
Native American or Alaska Native alone (NH)	323	517	596	0.47%	0.50%	0.51%
Asian alone (NH)	1,381	2,732	3,761	2.02%	2.63%	3.22%
Pacific Islander alone (NH)	632	1,588	2,450	0.92%	1.53%	2.09%
Other race alone (NH)	55	190	528	0.08%	0.18%	0.45%
Mixed race or Multiracial (NH)	979	2,106	4,455	1.43%	2.03%	3.81%
Hispanic or Latino (any race)	6,882	18,364	26,048	10.07%	17.71%	22.27%
Total	68,336	103,712	116,961	100.00%	100.00%	100.00%

=== 2020 census ===
As of the 2020 census, West Jordan had a population of 116,961. The median age was 31.6 years. 30.0% of residents were under the age of 18 and 8.9% of residents were 65 years of age or older. For every 100 females there were 98.9 males, and for every 100 females age 18 and over there were 96.8 males age 18 and over.

100.0% of residents lived in urban areas, while 0.0% lived in rural areas.

There were 35,044 households in West Jordan, of which 46.3% had children under the age of 18 living in them. Of all households, 61.3% were married-couple households, 13.2% were households with a male householder and no spouse or partner present, and 19.6% were households with a female householder and no spouse or partner present. About 14.3% of all households were made up of individuals and 4.5% had someone living alone who was 65 years of age or older.

There were 36,247 housing units, of which 3.3% were vacant. The homeowner vacancy rate was 0.6% and the rental vacancy rate was 7.2%.

Racial composition as of the 2020 census
Race	Number	Percent
White	83,147	71.1%
Black or African American	1,524	1.3%
American Indian and Alaska Native	1,194	1.0%
Asian	3,853	3.3%
Native Hawaiian and Other Pacific Islander	2,502	2.1%
Some other race	11,650	10.0%
Two or more races	13,091	11.2%
Hispanic or Latino (of any race)	26,048	22.3%

== Education ==
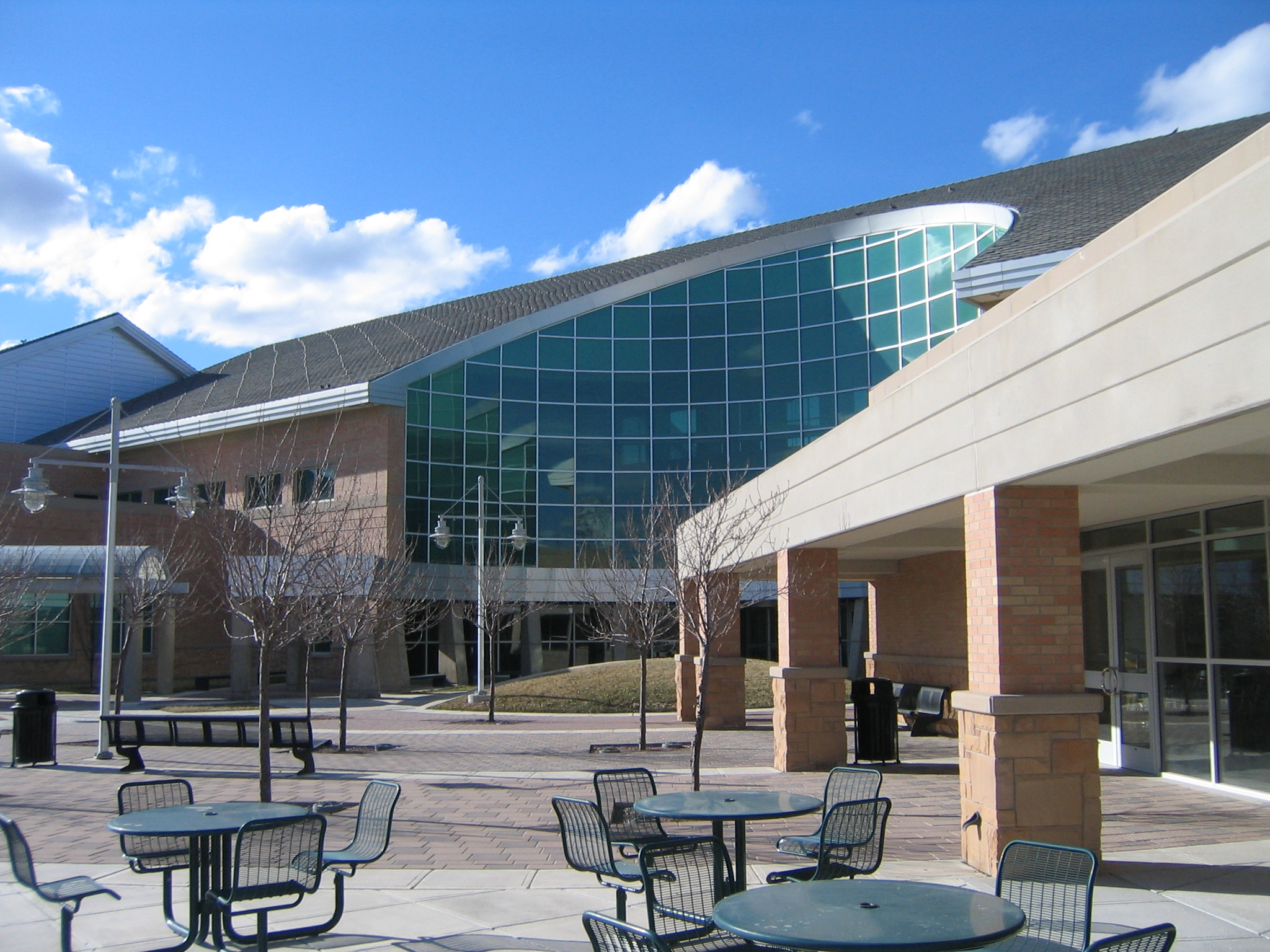
Salt Lake Community College

Most of West Jordan lies in the Jordan School District; however, due to a pair of annexations, two small sections along the northern border lie within the Granite School District. The city has 16 elementary schools (including one in the Granite District, Jim Bridger Elementary), four middle schools, and two high schools (West Jordan and Copper Hills). It is also the location of campuses of Salt Lake Community College and Broadview University.

Salt Lake Community College's Jordan Campus is located in West Jordan. The Jordan Campus offers general education classes as well as all of the college's health science courses. Jordan School District's Applied Technology Center is also located on campus.

== Transportation ==
Interstate 15, a twelve-lane freeway, is located east of the city limits, providing access from the north and south, while Interstate 215, an eight-lane beltway, is located northeast of the city. Bangerter Highway (State Route 154), a six-lane expressway, traverses the center of the city, just east of South Valley Regional Airport and the Jordan Landing shopping center. A ten-lane freeway called the Mountain View Corridor (SR-85) is planned to have three exits in the city (7800 S, 9000 S, and Old Bingham Hwy.) and run north–south at about 5800 West in the south and bend west to 6400 West in the north. The first phase of the project was completed December 15, 2012.

7800 South enters the city at the Jordan River and runs west through the city until it intersects with Utah Road 111. Redwood Road (State Route 68), a six-lane road, runs through the eastern portion of the city. In the far western extremes of the city, State Route 111, a two-lane road, runs through the developing rural area along the foothills. Development has recently begun to expand beyond SR-111.

In the middle of West Jordan is located the South Valley Regional Airport. Its FAA designation is U-42. It was formally known as Airport #2, because it is owned by Salt Lake City and is a subsidiary of Salt Lake City International Airport. The airport was originally part of Camp Kearns and was the Kearns Army Airfield during World War II. Because of its location within the city, a large shopping center was built next to the airport, which resulted in the shopping center being named Jordan Landing.

West Jordan is served by the Utah Transit Authority (UTA) bus system, which runs every half-hour during peak hours. All of the routes running into the city connect to nearby TRAX stations in Midvale and Sandy or to downtown Salt Lake City. Service in the city was increased during the August 2007 redesign of the bus system. A TRAX light rail line also serves the area. This line begins at the Fashion Place West station in Murray and run southwest through West Jordan, with 6 stops in the city, before turning south and terminating at the Daybreak Community in South Jordan. The route was opened on August 7, 2011.

Transportation has been a major issue in city politics. The city's population has expanded from about 4,000 in 1970 to over 100,000 in 2010, outstripping the capacity of roadways and infrastructure. At city council meetings it has been common for residents, particularly those on the western edge of the city, to complain about having one-hour commutes to downtown Salt Lake City, a distance of 26 miles (42 km). Elected officials have blamed this situation on the fact that the city is the most populous in the state that is not directly served by a freeway. In addition to significant road widening projects throughout the city, the Mountain View Corridor, a future freeway, is partially completed to service the western portion of the city.

== Notable people ==
- Delila Abbotts, Utah state legislator
- Don Fullmer, boxer
- Gene Fullmer, boxer, 1957 world middleweight champion
- Wassef Ali Hassoun, U.S. Marine
- Ken Ivory, Utah state legislator
- Carolyn Jessop, former member of Fundamentalist Church of Jesus Christ of Latter Day Saints, wrote book about her experience, Escape
- Sealver Siliga, professional football player, National Football League

== In the media ==
- In the fictional HBO drama Big Love, one of Bill Henrickson's home improvement stores is located in West Jordan.

== Sister cities ==
West Jordan has a sister city, as designated by Sister Cities International:

- Votkinsk, Udmurtia, Russia

== See also ==
- Salt Lake City metropolitan area
