= South Valley Regional Airport =

Airport in Salt Lake County, Utah

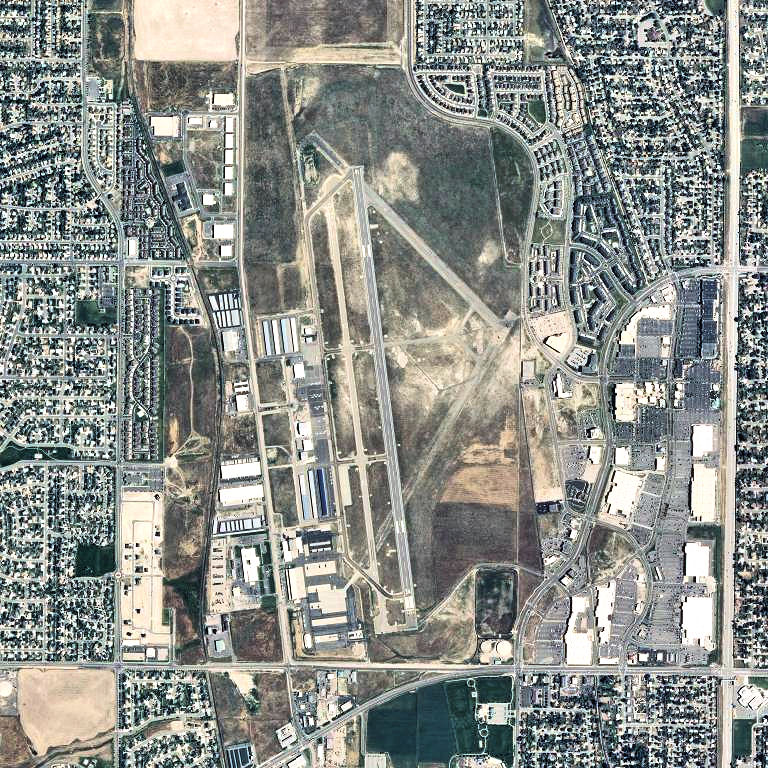
- 2006 USGS airphoto
- IATA: none; ICAO: KSVR; FAA LID: SVR

Summary
- Airport type: Public
- Operator: Salt Lake City Department of Airports
- Location: West Jordan, Utah
- Elevation AMSL: 4,607 ft (1,404 m)
- Coordinates: 40°37′10″N 111°59′34″W
- Website: https://slcairport.com/about-the-airport/general-aviation/south-valley-regional-airport/

Map
- Location of airport in Utah / United States SVR (the United States)

Runways
Direction	Length		Surface
Direction	ft	m	Surface
16/34	5,860	1,786	Asphalt
- Resources for this airport: FAA airport information for SVR; AirNav airport information for SVR; FlightAware airport information and live flight tracker; SkyVector aeronautical chart for SVR

South Valley Regional Airport (ICAO: KSVR, FAA LID: SVR), formerly (FAA LID: U42), is a public airport located in West Jordan, seven miles (11 km) southwest of Salt Lake City, Utah, United States. Originally named Municipal Airport No. 2, construction began July 8, 1941, and it opened around July 15, 1942. It is the primary general aviation airport in the area and is a Utah Army National Guard training base with Apache and Blackhawk helicopters. The Salt Lake City Department of Airports operates as the FBO.

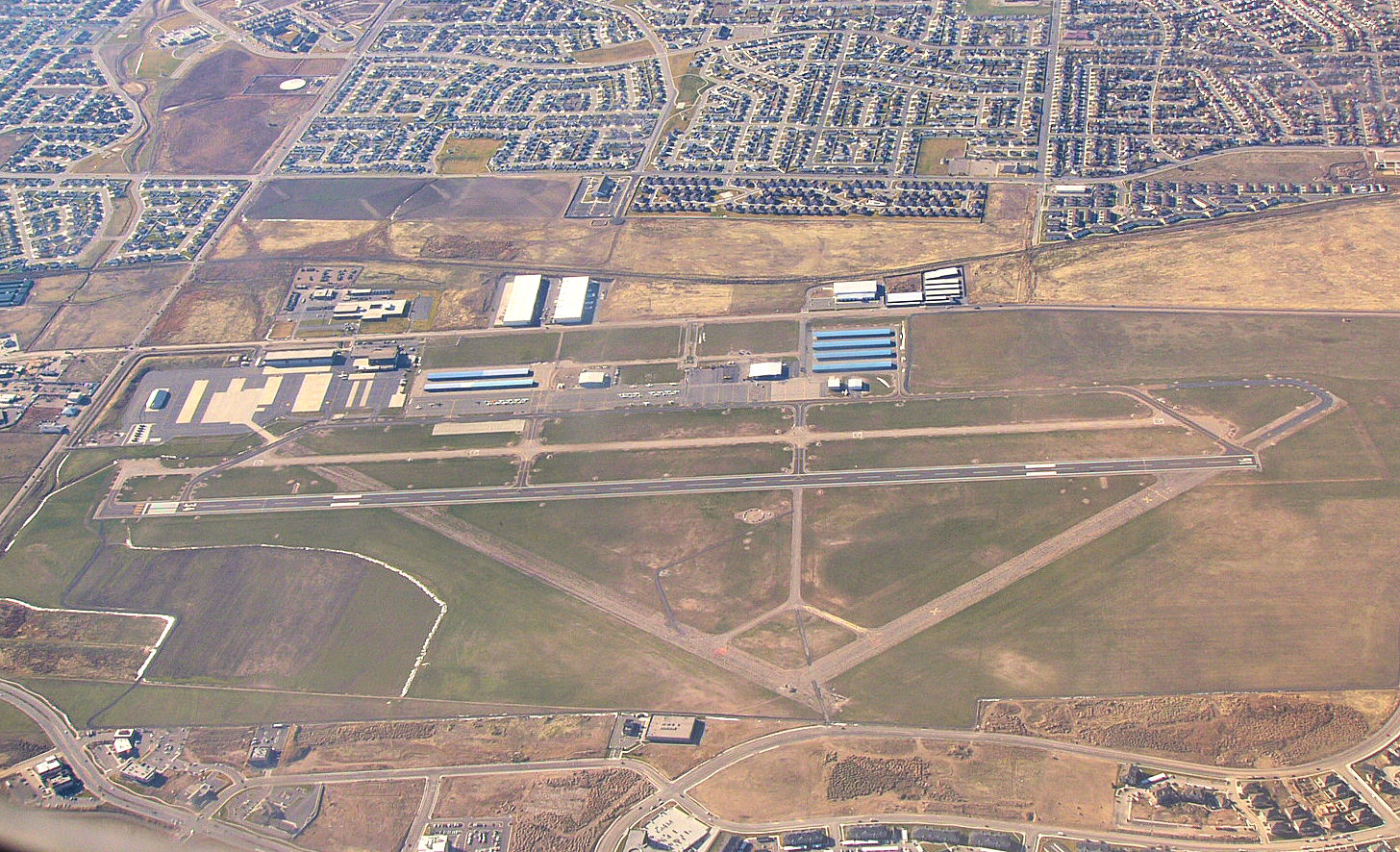
Oblique aerial photo

== History ==
The Salt Lake City Chamber of Commerce first proposed Municipal Airport No. 2 in late 1940. The airport was to be used chiefly for private fliers, to free the Salt Lake port for army and commercial transport use. On June 6, 1941, local contractor Gibbons & Reed was chosen as the winning bid to grade and pave one runway, and build the fencing and drainage and the clearing and grading began on July 8, 1941.

On April 2, 1942, the city commission gave final approval to a contract for V.L. Chapman to construct an 80 foot x 100 foot hangar, make other improvements, and for operation of a commercial flying business, paying the city a $50 per year ground lease for five years and 2 cents per gallon for all gasoline he sold. The target completion date was July 15, 1942.

On July 25, 1942, fifteen Naval Cadets began training by a private flying school under the civil pilot training program.

Around Thanksgiving 1944, a Kearns Flying Club began using privately owned single-engine Taylorcrafts, Porterfields, and a Fairchild. Men of all ranks from Kearns flew these and instruction went on 7 days a week.

The nearby base was sometimes called Army Air Base Kearns, but it had no runways. The Army never controlled or probably landed at Municipal Airport 2. The nine bomber units that arrived and left Kearns did so by train.

=== Since World War II ===
After World War II, the airport continued to be Salt Lake City Municipal Airport II. On 10 February 2009, the Salt Lake City Council voted to change the airport's name to South Valley Regional Airport. The council made the change in order to more clearly describe the location and function of the airport and because the traditional name of "Airport II" had "no historical significance."

Leading Edge Aviation was the onsite FBO until 2016. It was replaced by the Salt Lake City Department of Airports, which operated the FBO until 2026, when fractional operator SkyShare was selected to operate the FBO under an agreement with the Department of Airports."

=== Airport code change ===
On April 17th, 2025 the airport's ICAO code changed from U42 to KSVR after many years of lobbying from the airport operator. The goal now is to use this code to bring in more traffic and one day get a control tower.

== See also ==
- List of airports in Utah
- Skywest Airlines Flight 1834
