= Boogie Knight =

American football player (born 1999)

No. 1 – Sekisui Challengers
- Position: Wide receiver

Personal information
- Born: January 12, 1999 (age 27)
- Listed height: 5 ft 10 in (1.78 m)
- Listed weight: 190 lb (86 kg)

Career information
- High school: Jefferson Area (Jefferson, Ohio)
- College: Ohio State (2017); Akron (2018–2020); Louisiana–Monroe (2021–2022)
- NFL draft: 2023: undrafted

Career history
- Asahi Soft Drink / Sekisui Challengers (2023–2024); Mexicas de la Ciudad de México (2025); Sekisui Challengers (2026–present)

Awards and highlights
- Tazón México champion (VIII); LFA punt return yards leader (2025); X1 Super Rookie of the Year (2023); 2× First-team All-X1 Super (2023, 2024); X1 Super All-Star (2023); 2× X1 Super receptions leader (2023, 2024); X1 Super receiving yards leader (2023); X1 Super receiving touchdowns co-leader (2023); Third-team All-Sun Belt (2021)

Jeremiah "Boogie" Knight (born January 12, 1999) is an American football player who is a wide receiver for the Asahi Soft Drink / Sekisui Challengers of the X-League. He also played for Mexicas de la Ciudad de México of the Liga de Fútbol Americano Profesional (LFA). Knight played college football for the Akron Zips and Louisiana–Monroe Warhawks.

== Early life and high school career ==
Jeremiah Knight was born on January 12, 1999, the youngest of six children of John and Dana Knight. He attended Jefferson Area High School in Jefferson, Ohio, where he was a four-year letterwinner and three-year starting running back on the football team. As a freshman in 2013, Knight rushed for 735 yards and caught 13 passes for 144 yards in seven games, earning first-team all-county accolades. He then rushed for 1,317 yards and 13 touchdowns as a sophomore and was named the Ashtabula County Offensive Player of the Year before he rushed for 1,593 yards and 21 touchdowns in his junior season, repeating as County Offensive Player of the Year in addition to earning third-team all-state honors.

As a senior in 2016, Knight rushed for 2,233 rushing yards and 23 touchdowns on 11 yards per carry, marking the first 2,000-yard rushing season in county history. He recorded six 200-yard rushing games, including four in a row, and became a defensive starter at cornerback and safety, tallying 12 pass break-ups in 10 games. Knight was named the County Player of the Year, the District Player of the Year, and a first-team all-state honoree. He finished his career as the all-time leading rusher in county history with 5,850 rushing yards and 66 rushing touchdowns. In addition to football, Knight was a four-year letterman in track and field.

=== Recruiting ===
Knight was rated as a two-star recruit by 247Sports. He received walk-on offers from programs such as Dayton, Eastern Kentucky, Marshall, Middle Tennessee and Youngstown State, and at one point was verbally committed to Dayton. Knight was offered a preferred walk-on spot at Ohio State in November 2016, and he flipped his commitment to the Buckeyes the following month. "It's always been my dream school," said Knight. "Ever since I was like 3 or 4 years old, ever since I've been playing football, I've wanted to play at Ohio State, it's been my goal. All the hard work I've done has been to be a Division I athlete, but really more like an D-I athlete for Ohio State."

== College career ==
=== Ohio State ===
Knight enrolled at Ohio State University and joined the Buckeyes in 2017 as a preferred walk-on. However, after tearing his ACL doing non-contact drills in training camp, he underwent surgery and took a medical redshirt. "It was tough at first, but I know God has a plan," said Knight. "I accepted it and started working harder." He also made the switch to wide receiver, modeling his game after Julian Edelman, who had switched from quarterback to receiver in the NFL.

=== Akron ===
After evaluating his opportunities at Ohio State as a walk-on with an ACL injury, Knight requested his release from the program after spring practices. "I began thinking I could be more effective at a MAC school. And I'd have the chance to play right away," he said. Knight received interest from a coach at Akron and committed to the Zips the day after visiting the school in May. As a redshirt freshman in 2018, he recorded nine receptions for 129 yards in 10 games. All nine catches came in the final three games, two of which he started at wide receiver. In his first start against Ohio, Knight made four catches for 94 yards. He was also the team's top kick returner with 245 yards on 16 returns, and top punt returner, with 142 yards and one touchdown on 11 returns. Knight scored his first career touchdown on a 70-yard punt return against Eastern Michigan, which was the longest by an Akron player that season. He was given the Harry "Doc" Smith Award for the team's most outstanding freshman on offense. Ahead of his redshirt sophomore season in 2019, Knight was named preseason first-team All-MAC by Phil Steele and second-team All-MAC by Athlon Sports. He was also awarded a scholarship. Knight made six starts in 12 games played and paced the team with 833 all-purpose yards. He tallied 31 receptions for 430 yards as well as 356 kickoff return yards and 44 punt return yards. Knight set career-highs with five catches for 100 yards in their game against UMass. He later bested both marks against Eastern Michigan, recording six catches for 121 yards along with a then-career-high 95 kickoff return yards.

In 2020, Knight was named preseason fourth-team All-MAC by both Phil Steele and Athlon Sports. He played in all six games in a season shortened by the COVID-19 pandemic, for which he received an extra year of eligibility from the NCAA. However, Knight saw his role decrease and was primarily used offensively as a running back, hauling in just three receptions. In the season opener against Western Michigan, he recorded a career-high 74 rushing yards. In another game against Kent State, Knight posted a career-high 171 kickoff return yards on a school-record eight returns. He finished the season second on the team in rushing (39 carries for 194 yards) and all-purpose yards (660) while leading the Zips with 22 kickoff returns for 450 yards. On January 11, 2021, Knight announced his intention to enter the NCAA transfer portal. He cited the firing of previous head coach Terry Bowden following the 2018 season as a contributing factor, with his playing time decreasing in 2020 due to the influx of players recruited by the new coaching staff. "As more of their guys came in, it seemed they were starting to wash out Bowden's guys," said Knight. "This season, I really noticed they were playing freshmen and redshirt freshmen and I began to realize what was happening."

Knight earned his bachelor's degree in sports studies/education at Akron in 2021.

=== Louisiana–Monroe ===
Boogie Knight... is such a hard worker and he's such a pacesetter when it comes to work ethic. It's hard not to mention Boogie. He has stood out throughout the entire preseason as someone that sets the standard for everybody else to work at that pace because it's a different pace.

— Louisiana–Monroe head coach Terry Bowden when asked about preseason standouts at the team's 2020 media day

On January 19, 2021, just days after announcing his departure from Akron, Knight announced that he would be transferring to the University of Louisiana at Monroe to play under his former head coach, Terry Bowden, with two years of eligibility remaining. After adjusting to the area's humidity during summer workouts, he earned a starting spot at slot receiver. In his team debut for the Warhawks, Knight tallied six receptions for 58 yards against Kentucky and was named the team's co-offensive player of the week. In their home opener against Jackson State, he had six catches for 78 yards, which he later matched with a five-catch, 78-yard performance against Georgia State. In their next game against Liberty, Knight made a one-handed grab using his helmet, which was ranked as the top play on ESPN's SportsCenter at Night Top 10. The next week against South Alabama, he recorded six receptions for 75 yards and his first career receiving touchdown on a pass from Chandler Rogers, which he followed up by bring in five catches for 76 yards against Arkansas State. Knight then had a team-high five catches for 57 yards and a touchdown against LSU before he scored again on a season-long 46-yard reception on a pass from Rhett Rodriguez in the season finale against Louisiana. He started all 12 games on the season and led the Warhawks in receptions (45), receiving yards (588), receiving touchdowns (3), and all-purpose yards (824); his 239 combined kick return yards also ranked sixth in the conference. Knight was selected as the team's offensive MVP and earned third-team all-Sun Belt honors from the coaches and media, as well as second-team all-Sun Belt honors from Pro Football Focus.

Ahead of his final college football season in 2022, Knight was voted a preseason second-team All-Sun Belt selection by the coaches and media, as well as by Pro Football Focus (third team), Athlon Sports (third team), and Phil Steele (fourth team). However, he suffered a concussion in the first week of the season, which he tried to play through: "I didn't tell anyone, but it got worse and worse each week to where I couldn't see the ball and every time I got hit, I saw flashes of white." Dealing with the lingering effects of the injury, Knight missed three games and finished the season with just 19 catches for 170 yards and one touchdown. His lone score came on a 12-yard pass from Rogers against Army on October 22, and he surpassed 3,000 career all-purpose yards with a 37-yard catch from Rogers the following month against Georgia State. Knight later admitted, however, that he "didn't have the year [he] wanted to have". He ended his collegiate career one semester shy of earning his master's degree in criminal justice.

== Professional career ==
=== Asahi Soft Drink / Sekisui Challengers ===
==== 2023 season ====
Knight, who was projected as a late-round draft pick, ultimately went unselected in the 2023 NFL draft. He was then contacted by the Asahi Soft Drink Challengers of the X-League in Japan, who signed him to a contract soon afterwards. "Yeah, it's exciting," said Knight. It's also a bit nerve wracking. Being from Jefferson, Ohio and having never been out of the country... I'm excited to get in tune with that culture while also being able to play the game I love and make a difference." In the season opener, Knight recorded six receptions for 63 yards in a 17–13 win over the Tokyo Gas Creators. In round 2, he posted 11 catches for 193 yards and three touchdowns in a 49–13 win over the Dentsu Caterpillars. In the next game, Knight had 11 receptions for 105 yards and one touchdown in a 35–16 loss to the Obic Seagulls. In the regular season finale, he registered seven catches for 58 yards and one touchdown in a 29–16 loss to the Nojima Sagamihara Rise. Finally, Knight tallied five receptions for 39 yards and one touchdown in a 14–8 win over the Tainai Deers in the ranking match.

As a rookie, Knight led the league in receptions (39) and receiving yards (455) and finished second in receiving touchdowns (five) in the five-game regular season. He was named the Rookie of the Year and earned first-team all-league accolades. Knight was also selected to represent the Japan All-Star Team in the Dream Japan Bowl against the Ivy League All-Star Team in January 2024; he made two catches for nine yards in the 10–5 win, which marked the first win for Japan over the U.S. in the game's history. "It is awesome to play football in Japan, I loved every minute of my rookie season," said Knight.

==== 2024 season ====
Knight renewed his contract with the Challengers ahead of the 2024 season. After the team's opener was postponed due to Typhoon Shanshan, he made eight catches for 36 yards and a touchdown in a 14–13 loss to the Panasonic Impulse in round 2. In round 3, Knight had 10 receptions for 111 yards and one touchdown in a 42–3 blowout win over the Pleiades Fukuoka Suns. The following week, he posted a season-high 12 catches for 200 yards and three touchdowns in their round 1 make-up game, a 21–20 win over the Elecom Kobe Finies. Knight recorded 11 receptions for 120 yards in a 35–7 loss to the Fujitsu Frontiers in round 5. He closed the regular season by registering eight catches for 101 yards and one touchdown in a 22–0 win over the Fuji Xerox Minerva AFC, finishing his second season with a league-leading 58 receptions for 649 yards and six touchdowns.

The Challengers qualified for the playoffs, known as the Rice Bowl Tournament. In the quarterfinals, Knight recorded 10 receptions for 71 yards in a 21–0 win over the Tokyo Gas Creators. In the semifinals two weeks later, he hauled in 10 catches for 106 yards and one touchdown in a 52–21 loss to the Fujitsu Frontiers. Knight repeated as a first-team all-league selection.

=== Mexicas de la Ciudad de México ===
==== 2025 season ====
In 2025, Knight signed with the Mexicas de la Ciudad de México of the Liga de Fútbol Americano Profesional (LFA). He caught a touchdown in a 27–3 win over the Reyes de Jalisco in week 2. He was later joined on the team by Jiya Wright, an ex-teammate at Louisiana–Monroe, who was signed midseason as an emergency quarterback. In week 7, Knight caught a touchdown pass from Wright in a 33–20 win over the Dinos de Saltillo which clinched the top seed in the playoffs for the Mexicas. When Wright went down with an injury on the opening drive of the regular season finale against the Caudillos de Chihuahua, Knight shared quarterback duties with defensive back John Washington despite having no prior experience under center. He had a field-flipping run, taking the ball from his own 5-yard line to the Chihuahua red zone, and later threw a 75-yard touchdown pass to Pierre Williams in a 30–17 loss, becoming the first non-quarterback in LFA history to throw for a touchdown.

Knight finished the regular season ranked second in the league in receiving yards (485) and third in receptions (37), and tallied two receiving touchdowns and one passing touchdown. He also recorded a league-leading 310 punt return yards, along with 193 kickoff return yards, 120 rushing yards, and 103 passing yards. He helped the Mexicas reach the LFA championship game, Tazón México VIII, where they beat the Osos de Monterrey, 13–12.

== Personal life ==
Knight's father died in 2009, which he has pointed to as a motivation to succeed. "When my father passed when I was younger, that was the switch that went off," he said. "I was about 9 years old and ever since then, it really motivated me. Me and him always had the dream of me making it to the NFL, so I use it as motivation. That's where that work ethic and hunger comes from." One of his older brothers, Johnny, played college baseball at Walsh and played with the Eastside Diamond Hoppers of the United Shore Professional Baseball League in 2018.

Knight was nicknamed "Boogie" by his parents at age seven because he was "shifty and really quick" with the ball while playing youth football. In 2021, Larry Brown Sports called it the best name in college football. The following year, Knight was selected to the college football all-name team by 247Sports, sharing the honor with players such as General Booty, Storm Duck, and Kool-Aid McKinstry. He named Julian Edelman as his childhood hero.

During his first season at Louisiana–Monroe, Knight signed an NIL deal with TC Designs, a signs and designs store in West Monroe, to release "Boogie Kn1gh7" apparel.
