= AFC Cranes =

American football team in Japan

General information
- Founded: 1987
- Headquartered: Tsurumi-ku, Yokohama, Japan
- Colors: Green, Yellow and Black
- Website: http://club-cranes.net/

Personnel
- General manager: Koji Imai
- Head coach: Yohei Suzuki

League / conference affiliations
- X-League; X2 Central Division

The AFC Cranes are an American football team located in the Tsurumi-ku, Yokohama, Japan. They are a member of the X-League.

== Team history ==
- 1987 Team founded by TOA Corporation employees.
- 1994 Joined the X-League X3 division as the TOA Corporation Cranes.
- 2001 Promoted from X3 to X2.
- 2009 Finished 1st in the X2 East division (4 wins, 2 losses). Declined participation in the X2-X1 promotion match due to circumstances.
- 2012 New sponsorship agreement with Taiyo Building management. Team renamed the Taiyo Building Mgmt. Cranes.
- 2013 Finished 1st in the X2 East division (5 wins, 2 losses). Won X2-X1 promotion match against the Tokyo MPD Eagles 17-16. Promoted to X1 for the following season.
- 2014 Finished 6th in the X1 Central division (0 wins, 8 losses). Lost X1-X2 replacement game against the Tokyo MPD Eagles 14-29. Demoted to X2 for the following season.
- 2015 Taiyo Building management ends team sponsorship. Team is renamed the AFC Cranes.

== Seasons ==
X-League champions (1987–present)	Division champions	Final Stage/Semifinals Berth	Wild Card /First Stage Berth

Season	League	Division	Regular Season				Postseason results	Awards	Head coaches
Season	League	Division	Finish	Wins	Losses	Ties	Postseason results	Awards	Head coaches
2009	X2	East	1st	4	2	0			
2010	X2	East	2nd	5	2	1	Won X2 Semi-Final match ( Club Barbarian) 49-7		
2011	X2	East	3rd	4	2	0			
2012	X2	East	2nd	7	0	1	Lost X2 Semi-finals match (Dentsu) 20-24		Junichiro Okada
2013	X2	East	1st	5	2	0	Won X2-X1 promotion match (at Tokyo MPD) 17-16		Junichiro Okada
2014	X1	Central	6th	0	8	0	Lost 2nd stage relegation match (at Tokyo Gas) 15-63; Lost 2nd stage relegation match (at Meiji Yasuda) 14-68; Lost X1-X2 replacement match (Tokyo MPD) 14-29		Junichiro Okada
2015	X2	Central	4th	2	5	0			Junichiro Okada
2016	X2	East	4th	2	5	0			Junichiro Okada
2017	X2	East	3rd	4	4	0			Yohei Suzuki
2018	X2	East	2nd	6	1	0			Yohei Suzuki
2019	X1 Area	East	4th	0	9	0	Lost X1-X2 relegation match (at Bulls Football Club) 0-37		Yohei Suzuki
Total							(2009–2018, includes only regular season)		
Total							(2009–2018, includes only playoffs)		
Total							(2009–2018, includes both regular season and playoffs)		
