= All X-League Team =

The All X-League Team is an honor given in Japan to players that performed outstandingly on the gridiron during the X-League regular and post-seasons. Since 2000, the X-League honors outstanding players by electing them to the All X-League Team. 11 offensive players, 11 defensive players and 3 special team players are voted by the Head Coaches and 5 players on each of the 18 X1 teams to be selected for the team. Starting 2019, the All X-League team was divided between 2 classifications: The 8-team X1 Super and 12-team X1 Area with both selecting 11 offensive players, 11 defensive players and 3 special team players and are voted by the Head Coaches and 5 players on each of the teams. In 2020, the X1 Area All X League Team was expanded to include a West and East team due to the shortened season caused by the COVID-19 pandemic.

== Past All X-League Teams ==
=== 2002 ===
Position	Name	Time(s) selected
C	Masaki Kamoshida, Onward	2nd
OG	Naoki Hoshiya, Seagulls; Junji Yonezawa, Matsushita Electric Works	1st 1st
OT	Haruhisa Hiramoto, Asahi Soft Drinks; Hiromi Furukawa, Kajima	2nd 3rd
TE	Dai Yaoita, Kajima	1st
WR	Satoru Momosawa, Asahi Soft Drinks; Mikio Yasuda, IBM	1st 1st
RB	Hiroyuki Morimoto, Fujitsu; Takuya Furutani, Obic	3rd 2nd
QB	Kazuyoshi Suzuki, Kajima	3rd
DT	Yuichi Kato, Asahi Soft Drinks; Daisuke Nishimura, Lions	1st 1st
DE	Yasuo Wakikasa, Matsushita Electric Works; Shoji Tatsuro, Obic	3rd 1st
MLB	Masaki Tokimoto, Onward	2nd
OLB	Shinzo Yamada, Asahi Soft Drinks; Yoshito Hiramoto, Fujitsu	3rd 1st
S	Yasumasa Tamanoi, Obic; Koji Oshima, Asahi Soft Drinks	1st 2nd
CB	Masahiro Nomura, Matsushita Electric Works; Toshinobu Ichikawa, Onward	3rd 1st
K	Masahiro Ota, Matsushita Electric Works	1st
P	Taisaku Senba, Iwatani	1st
RET	Ken Shimizu, Obic	1st

=== 2003 ===
Position	Name	Time(s) selected
C	Masaki Kamoshida, Onward	3rd
OG	Naoki Hoshiya, Seagulls; Hiroki Terayama, Asahi Beer	2nd 1st
OT	Haruhisa Hiramoto, Asahi Soft Drinks; Eita Imai, All Mitsubishi	3rd 2nd
TE	Yasuhiro Hashizume, Asahi Beer	2nd
WR	Shinji Shimokawa, Matsushita Electric Works; Sumusu Fukuda, Onward	1st 1st
RB	Hiroyuki Morimoto, Fujitsu; Takuya Furutani, Obic	4th 3rd
QB	Yuichi Tomizawa, Onward	1st
DT	Yusuke Yabe, Onward; Masahiro Nishi, Fujitsu	1st 1st
DE	Yasuo Wakikasa, Matsushita Electric Works; Shoji Tatsuro, Obic	4th 2nd
MLB	Masaki Tokimoto, Onward	3rd
OLB	Yoshito Hiramoto, Fujitsu; Kentaro Azuma, Matsushita Electric Works	2nd 1st
S	Tadaya Sano, Kajima; Koji Oshima, Asahi Soft Drinks	2nd 3rd
CB	Masahiro Nomura, Matsushita Electric Works; Toshinobu Ichikawa, Onward	4th 2nd
K	Tomohiro Tanaka, Kajima	1st
P	Yutaka Yamaguchi, Asahi Beer	2nd
RET	Naoki Sasano, Kajima	1st

=== 2004 ===
Position	Name	Time(s) selected
C	Toshiharu Kuratani, Matsushita Electric Works	1st
OG	Hiromi Furukawa, Kashima; Daisuke Kojima, AS ONE	4th 2nd
OT	Haruhisa Hiramoto, Asahi Soft Drinks; Atsushi Yoshida, AS ONE	4th 1st
TE	Dai Yaoita, Kashima	2nd
WR	Brad Brennan, Fujitsu; Shinji Shimokawa, Matsushita Electric Works	1st 2nd
RB	Jindai Ishino, Matsushita Electric Works; Takuya Furutani, Obic	1st 4th
QB	Yuichi Tomizawa, Onward	2nd
DT	Yasuo Wakisaka, Matsushita Electric Works; Tatsuro Shoji, Obic	5th 3rd
DE	Takuro Abe, Obic; Masayoshi Yamanaka, Matsushita Electrick Works	1st 1st
MLB	Masaki Tokimoto, Onward	4th
OLB	Naoki Furusho, Obic; Kentaro Azuma, Matsushita Electric Works	1st 2nd
S	Tadaya Sano, Kashima; Koji Oshima, Asahi Soft Drinks	3rd 4th
CB	Masahiro Nomura, Matsushita Electric Works; Yasumasa Tamanoi, Obic	5th 2nd
K	Noboru Takeshima, Nissan	1st
P	Yutaka Yamaguchi, Asahi Beer	3rd
RET	Tetsu Reisui, All Mitsubishi	1st

=== 2005 ===
Position	Name	Time(s) selected
C	Toshiharu Kuratani, Matsushita Electric Works	2nd
OG	Yuji Kimura, Asahi Soft Drinks; Jonathan Giesel, IBM	1st 1st
OT	Haruhisa Hiramoto, Asahi Soft Drinks; Ken Izawa, Kashima	5th 1st
TE	Takashi Ninomiya, Meiji Yasuda	1st
WR	Ryoji Amaya, IBM; Satoshi Matsushita, Meiji Yasuda	1st 1st
RB	Satoshi Hirate, Kashima; Takuya Furutani, Obic	1st 5th
QB	Manabu Tatsumura, Obic	1st
DT	Tatsuro Shoji, Obic; Yuichi Kato, Asahi Soft Drinks	4th 2nd
DE	Kevin Jackson, Obic; Yasushitoku Miwa, Matsushita Electrick Works	1st 1st
MLB	Yosuke Isshiki, Nagai Denki	1st
OLB	Naoki Furusho, Obic; Takashi Makiuchi, Kashima	2nd 1st
S	Takahiro Sakae, Kashima; Kohei Satomi, Obic	1st 2nd
CB	Masahiro Nomura, Matsushita Electric Works; Akatsuki Abe, IBM	6th 1st
K	Noboru Takeshima, Nissan	2nd
P	Yutaka Yamaguchi, Asahi Beer	4th
RET	Koji Hayashi, Meiji Yasuda	1st

=== 2006 ===
Position	Name	Time(s) selected
C	Hiroshi Sato, Nagai Denki	1st
OG	Kazuhiro Kuramochi, Kashima; Yosuke Abe, Asahi Beer	1st 1st
OT	Haruhisa Hiramoto, Asahi Soft Drinks; Ken Izawa, Kashima	6th 2nd
TE	Takashi Ninomiya, Meiji Yasuda	2nd
WR	Shoei Hasegawa, Matsushita Electric Works; Satoru Momosawa, Asahi Soft Drinks	1st 2nd
RB	Jindai Ishino, Matsushita Electric Works; Shinji Yusuke, Fujitsu	2nd 1st
QB	Tetsuo Takata. Matsushita Electric Works	1st
DT	Yasuo Wakisaka, Matsushita Electric Works; Yuichi Kato, Asahi Soft Drinks	6th 3rd
DE	Kevin Jackson, Obic; Masayoshi Yamanaka, Matsushita Electrick Works	2nd 2nd
MLB	Setsuhito Tomai, Asahi Beer	2nd
OLB	Naoki Furusho, Obic; Takashi Makiuchi, Kashima	3rd 2nd
S	Daisuke Ueki, Fujitsu; Toru Nakata, Matsushita Electric Works	1st 1st
CB	Masahiro Nomura, Matsushita Electric Works; Yasumasa Tamanoi, Obic	7th 3rd
K	Masahiro Ota, Matsushita Electric Works	2nd
P	Yutaka Yamaguchi, Asahi Beer	5th
RET	Masatoshi Sugihara, Onward	1st

=== 2007 ===
Position	Name	Time(s) selected
C	Takehiro Murai, Kashima	1st
OG	Kazuhiro Kuramochi, Kashima; Takashi Murakami, IBM	2nd 1st
OT	Haruhisa Hiramoto, Asahi Soft Drinks; Ken Izawa, Kashima	7th 3rd
TE	Takashi Ninomiya, Meiji Yasuda	3rd
WR	Yu Nakajima, Asahi Beer; Shinji Shimokawa, Matsushita Electric Works	1st 3rd
RB	Jindai Ishino, Matsushita Electric Works; Takuya Furutani, Obic	3rd 6th
QB	Yuichi Tomizawa, Onward	3rd
DT	Yasuo Wakisaka, Matsushita Electric Works; Yusuke Yabe, Onward	7th 2nd
DE	Kevin Jackson, Obic; Mitsunori Kihira, Obic	3rd 1st
MLB	Takashi Mikiuchi, Kashima	3rd
OLB	Naoki Furusho, Obic; Kentaro Azuma, Matsushita Electric Works	4th 3rd
S	Daisuke Ueki, Fujitsu; Tadaya Sano, Kashima	2nd 4th
CB	Yuichi Watanabe, Obic; Ken Nagata, All Mitsubishi	1st 1st
K	Yosuke Kaneoya, Obic	1st
P	Satoshi Kinshi, All Mitsubishi	1st
RET	Ken Shimizu, Obic	2nd

=== 2008 ===
Position	Name	Time(s) selected
C	Frank Fernandez, Onward	1st
OG	Kazuhiro Kuramochi, Kashima; Naoki Hoshiya, Asahi Soft Drinks	3rd 3rd
OT	Hiroyuki Abe, Asahi Soft Drinks; Ken Izawa, Kashima	1st 4th
TE	Haruhisa Hiramoto, Asahi Soft Drinks	8th
WR	Shoei Hasegawa, Panasonic Electric Works; Takeshi Akiyama, Fujitsu	2nd 1st
RB	Jindai Ishino, Panasonic Electric Works; Masato Sugiyama, Asahi Soft Drinks	4th 1st
QB	Shun Sugawara, Onward	1st
DT	Motoyuki Hirai, Fujitsu; Ryota Ikura, Onward	1st 1st
DE	Kevin Jackson, Obic; Takeshi Nishikawa, Fujitsu	4th 3rd
MLB	Soichiro Suzuki, Fujitsu	1st
OLB	Naoki Furusho, Obic; Kentaro Azuma, Panasonic Electric Works	5th 4th
S	Daisuke Ueki, Fujitsu; Ryusho Terada, Obic	3rd 1st
CB	Yuichi Watanabe, Obic; Reggie Mitchell, Onward	2nd 1st
K	Yosuke Kaneoya, Obic	2nd
P	Takashi Yamaoka, Asahi Soft Drinks	1st
RET	Masatoshi Sugihara, Onward	2nd

=== 2009 ===
Position	Name	Time(s) selected
C	Naoki Yamamoto, Fujitsu	1st
OG	Takashi Murakami, IBM; Kazuhiro Kuramochi, Kashima	2nd 4th
OT	Yuji Taniguchi, Panasonic Electric Works; Ken Izawa, Kashima	1st 5th
TE	Takashi Ryozen, Panasonic Electric Works	2nd
WR	Ryoma Hagiyama, Obic; Brad Brennan, Fujitsu	1st 2nd
RB	Jindai Ishino, Panasonic Electric Works; Yasuhiro Maruta, Kashima	5th 1st
QB	Tetsuo Takata, Panasonic Electric Works	2nd
DT	Takeshi Nishikawa, Kashima; Takayuki Yoneda, Asahi Beer	2nd 1st
DE	Kevin Jackson, Obic; Yasushitoku Miwa, Panasonic Electric Works	5th 2nd
MLB	Setsuhito Tomai, Asahi Beer	3rd
OLB	Hiruma Shingo, Kashima; Kentaro Azuma, Panasonic Electric Works	1st 5th
S	Tadaya Sano, Kashima; Naoki Furusho, Obic	5th 6th
CB	Atsushi Fujita, Fujitsu; Kenta Kudo, Asahi Beer	1st 2nd
K	Kenji Ogasawara, Panasonic Electric Works	1st
P	Sai Yoshihiro, IBM	1st
RET	Ken Shimizu, Obic	3rd

=== 2010 ===
Position	Name	Time(s) selected
C	Tsueno Sano, Panasonic Electric Works	1st
OG	Takashi Murakami, IBM; Kazuhiro Kuramochi, Kashima	1st 9th
OT	Shi Miyamoto, Obic; Haruhisa Hiramoto, Asahi Soft Drinks	1st 5th
TE	Takashi Ninomiya, Meiji Yasuda	4th
WR	Akira Honda, Panasonic Electric Works; Michiyo Ogawa, IBM	1st 1st
RB	Jindai Ishino, Panasonic Electric Works; Toichiro Tsukuda, Asahi Soft Drinks	6th 1st
QB	Tetsuo Takata, Panasonic Electric Works	3rd
DT	Takeshi Nishikawa, Kashima; Mitsunori Kihira, Obic	3rd 2nd
DE	Kevin Jackson, Obic; Shuhei Suzuki, Kashima	6th 1st
MLB	Hironobu Hoshida, Asahi Beer	1st
OLB	Naoki Furusho, Obic; Takashi Makiuchi, Kashima	4th 1st
S	Daisuke Ueki, Fujitsu; Takeshi Miyake, Obic	4th 1st
CB	Atsushi Tsuji, Panasonic Electric Works; Tadaya Sano, Kashima	1st 6th
K	Daisuke Aoki, Kashima	1st
P	Kenji Ogasawara, Panasonic Electric Works	2nd
RET	Naoki Maeda, Kashima	1st

=== 2011 ===
Position	Name	Time(s) selected
C	Derek Furby, Nojima Sagamihara	1st
OG	Frank Fernandez, Obic; Kazuhiro Kuramochi, Kashima	2nd 6th
OT	Yutaro Kobayashi, Fujitsu; Takehito Noda, Asahi Soft Drinks	1st 1st
TE	Yuji Oya, Fujitsu	1st
WR	Katsuya Eikawa, Kashima; Yasushi Nakagawa, Kashima	1st 1st
RB	Masatoshi Sugihara, Nojima Sagamihara; Yuichi Kimu, Fujitsu	3rd 1st
QB	Masato Kinoshita, Nojima Sagamihara	1st
DT	Ryota Ikura, Nojima Sagamihara; Keita Komiya, Kashima	2nd 1st
DE	Kevin Jackson, Obic; Motoyuki Hirai, Fujitsu	7th 2nd
MLB	Karl Noa, Obic	1st
OLB	Soichiro Suzuki, Fujitsu; Masakatsu Tsukada, Obic	2nd 1st
S	Ryohei Imanishi, Panasonic; Takeshi Miyake, Obic	1st 2nd
CB	Masashi Fujimoto, Obic; Hiroki Kato, Kashima	1st 1st
K	Tsuyoshi Nishimura, Fujitsu	1st
P	Daisuke Aoki, Kashima	2nd
RET	Ken Shimizu, Obic	4th

=== 2012 ===
Position	Name	Time(s) selected
C	Tsueno Sano, Panasonic	2nd
OG	Daisuke Kojima, Kashima; Kazuhiro Kuramochi, Kashima	3rd 7th
OT	Hisashi Kurokawa, Asahi Soft Drinks; Takehito Noda, Asahi Soft Drinks	1st 2nd
TE	Musashi Yoshida, Panasonic	1st
WR	Naoki Maeda, Kashima; Noriaki Kinoshita, Obic	1st 1st
RB	Yasuhiro Maruta, Kashima; Sho Nakanishi, Obic	2nd 1st
QB	Kevin Craft, IBM	1st
DT	Mitsunori Kihira, Obic; Keita Komiya, Kashima	3rd 2nd
DE	Kevin Jackson, Obic; Shuhei Suzuki, Kashima	8th 2nd
MLB	Yusuke Kishimoto, IBM	1st
OLB	Naoki Furusho, Obic; Soichiro Suzuki, Fujitsu	8th 3rd
S	Toshihiro Yamada, As One Black Eagles; Takeshi Miyake, Obic	1st 3rd
CB	Yuichi Watanabe, Obic; Hiroki Kato, Kashima	3rd 2nd
K	Tsuyoshi Nishimura, Fujitsu	2nd
P	Daisuke Aoki, Kashima	3rd
RET	Ryohei Imanishi, Panasonic	2nd

=== 2013 ===
Position	Name	Time(s) selected
C	Tsueno Sano, Panasonic	3rd
OG	Keith Ahsoon, Nojima Sagamihara; Masahiro Asano, Panasonic	1st 1st
OT	Kealakai Maiava, Obic; Yutaro Kobayashi, Fujitsu	1st 2nd
TE	John Stanton, IBM	1st
WR	Naoki Maeda, Kashima; Noriaki Kinoshita, Obic	2nd 2nd
RB	Tomokazu Sueyoshi, IBM; Shinji Yusuke, Fujitsu	1st 2nd
QB	Kevin Craft, IBM	2nd
DT	Shota Tomita, Obic; Daiki Hisashi, Panasonic	1st 1st
DE	Kevin Jackson, Obic; Byron Beatty Jr., Obic	9th 1st
MLB	Yuji Aoki, Fujitsu	1st
OLB	David Motu, Panasonic; Naoki Furusho, Obic	1st 9th
S	Ryohei Imanishi, Panasonic; Hidetoshi Yano, Kashima	3rd 1st
CB	Masashi Fujimoto, Obic; Al-Rilwan Adeyami, Fujitsu	2nd 1st
K	Eita Saeki, Panasonic	1st
P	Daisuke Aoki, Kashima	4th
RET	Yuki Ikei, Obic	1st

=== 2014 ===
Position	Name	Time(s) selected
C	Derek Furby, Nojima Sagamihara Rise	2nd
OG	Shun Mochizuki, Fujitsu; Yusuke Yamamoto	1st 1st
OT	Hisashi Kurokawa; Yutaro Kobayashi, Fujitsu	2nd 3rd
TE	John Stanton, IBM	2nd
WR	Clark Nakamura, Fujitsu; Noriaki Kinoshita, Obic	1st 3rd
RB	Takuto Hara, Obic; Gino Gordon, Fujitsu	1st 1st
QB	Colby Cameron, Fujitsu	1st
DT	Shota Tomita, Obic; Shuhei Suzuki, Lixil	2nd 3rd
DE	Kevin Jackson, Obic; James Brooks, IBM	10th 1st
MLB	Mutsumi Takahashi, Elecom Kobe	1st
OLB	Soichiro Suzuki, Fujitsu; Kenjiro Yota, Lixil	4th 1st
S	Takashi Miyake, Obic; Shinya Miki, Fujitsu	4th 1st
CB	Keizaburo Sunagawa, Obic; Al-Rilwan Adeyami, Fujitsu	1st 2nd
K	Tsuyoshi Nishimura, Fujitsu	3rd
P	Daisuke Aoki, Lixil	5th
RET	Noriaki Kinoshita, Obic	3rd

=== 2015 ===
Position	Name	Time(s) selected
C	Edmond Davis, Panasonic	1st
OG	Shun Mochizuki, Fujitsu; Scott Duffy, Panasonic	2nd 1st
OT	Hisashi Kurokawa; Yutaro Kobayashi, Fujitsu	3rd 4th
TE	Yuji Mizuno, Fujitsu	1st
WR	Tatsuya Tonka, Panasonic; Roman Wilson, Asahi Beer	1st 1st
RB	Tomokazu Sueyoshi, IBM; Benjamin Dupree, Panasonic	2nd 1st
QB	Tetsuo Takata, Panasonic	4th
DT	Shota Tomita, Obic; Shuhei Suzuki, Lixil	3rd 4th
DE	David Motu, Panasonic; James Brooks, IBM	2nd 2nd
MLB	Akira Ando, Asahi Soft Drinks	1st
OLB	Yoshiki Tanaka, Nojima Sagamihara; Kensuke Amaya, Lixil	1st 1st
S	Yuto Omori, Asahi Beer; Atsushi Tsuji, Panasonic	1st 2nd
CB	Masashi Fujimoto, Obic; Al-Rilwan Adeyami, Fujitsu	3rd 3rd
K	Tsuyoshi Nishimura, Fujitsu	4th
P	Makoto Saeki, Panasonic	1st
RET	Takashi Kurihara, IBM	1st

=== 2016 ===
Position	Name	Time(s) selected
C	Edmond Davis, Panasonic	2nd
OG	Shun Mochizuki, Fujitsu; Yusuke Yamamoto, Obic	3rd 2nd
OT	Kai Maiava, Obic; Yutaro Kobayashi, Fujitsu	2nd 5th
TE	John Stanton, IBM	3rd
WR	Jeremy Gallon, Nojima Sagamihara; Clark Nakamura, Fujitsu	1st 2nd
RB	Tomokazu Sueyoshi, IBM; Gino Gordon, Fujitsu	3rd 2nd
QB	Colby Cameron, Fujitsu	2nd
DT	Byron Beatty Jr., Obic; Rykeem Yates, IBM	2nd 1st
DE	David Motu, Panasonic; James Brooks, IBM	2nd 3rd
MLB	Yoshiki Tanaka, Nojima Sagamihara	2nd
OLB	Trashaun Nixon, Fujitsu; Shohei Takeuchi, Fujitsu	1st 1st
S	Keizaburo Isegawa, Obic; Masashi Fujimoto, Obic	2nd 4th
CB	Al-Riwan Adeyami, Fujitsu; Emory Polley, Panasonic	4th 1st
K	Hidetetsu Nishimura, Fujitsu	5th
P	Shintaro Saeki, Panasonic	2nd
RET	Noriaki Kinoshita, Obic	2nd

=== 2017 ===
Position	Name	Time(s) selected
C	Edmond Davis, Panasonic	3rd
OG	Shun Mochizuki, Fujitsu; Tomoaki Sakaguchi, Panasonic	4th 1st
OT	Kai Maiava, Obic; Yutaro Kobayashi, Fujitsu	3rd 6th
TE	John Stanton, IBM	4th
WR	Yuhei Yagi, Nojima Sagamihara; Clark Nakamura, Fujitsu	1st 3rd
RB	Yuki Shirakami, LIXIL; Gino Gordon, Fujitsu	1st 3rd
QB	Devin Gardner, Nojima Sagamihara	1st
DT	Hiroaki Nakazato, Obic; Carlton Jones, Panasonic	1st 1st
DE	David Motu, Panasonic; James Brooks, IBM	3rd 4th
MLB	Takuya Iwamoto, Obic	1st
OLB	Trashaun Nixon, Fujitsu; Kensuke Amaya, LIXIL	2nd 2nd
S	Atsushi Tsuji, Panasonic; Masashi Fujimoto, Obic	3rd 5th
CB	Al-Riwan Adeyami, Fujitsu; Emory Polley, Panasonic	5th 2nd
K	Hidetetsu Nishimura, Fujitsu	6th
P	Shintaro Saeki, Panasonic	3rd
RET	Noriaki Kinoshita, Obic	3rd

=== 2018 ===
Position	Name	Time(s) selected
C	Edmond Davis, Panasonic	4th
OG	Shun Mochizuki, Fujitsu; Hiroki Kurano, Fujitsu	5th 1st
OT	Akira Katsuyama, Fujitsu; Yutaro Kobayashi, Fujitsu	3rd 7th
TE	John Stanton, IBM	5th
WR	Yuhei Yagi, Nojima Sagamihara; Teruaki Clark Nakamura, Fujitsu	2nd 4th
RB	Trashaun Nixon, Fujitsu; Shun Yokota, Panasonic	3rd 1st
QB	Cody Sokol, Elecom Kobe	1st
DT	Byron Beatty Jr., Obic; Carlton Jones, Panasonic	3rd 2nd
DE	David Motu, Panasonic; James Brooks, IBM	5th 5th
MLB	Takuya Iwamoto, Obic	2nd
OLB	Joe Mathis, Fujitsu; Naoki Hayashi, Panasonic	1st 1st
S	Atsushi Tsuji, Panasonic; Bronson Beatty, Obic	4th 1st
CB	Al-Riwan Adeyami, Fujitsu; Yudai Tanaka, Obic	6th 2nd
K	Shintaro Saeki, Panasonic	4th
P	Shintaro Saeki, Panasonic	4th
RET	Takashi Kurihara, IBM	2nd

=== 2019 ===
==== X1 Super ====
Position	Name	Time(s) selected
C	Kohei Yamashita, Fujitsu	1st
OG	Shun Mochizuki, Fujitsu; Tomoaki Sakaguchi, Panasonic	6th 2nd
OT	Akira Katsuyama, Fujitsu; Yutaro Kobayashi, Fujitsu	4th 8th
TE	John Stanton, IBM	6th
WR	Yoshihito Omi, IBM; Alfonso Onunwor, Elecom Kobe	1st 1st
RB	Samajie Grant, Fujitsu; Taku Lee, Obic	1st 1st
QB	Kevin Craft, IBM	3rd
DT	Byron Beatty Jr., Obic; Hiroaki Nakazato, Obic	3rd 2nd
DE	David Motu, Panasonic; James Brooks, IBM	6th 6th
MLB	Takuya Iwamoto, Obic	3rd
OLB	Yoshiki Tanaka, Nojima Sagamihara; Naoki Hayashi, Panasonic	3rd 2nd
S	Toshiki Kimura, Elecom Kobe; Bronson Beatty, Obic	1st 2nd
CB	Al-Riwan Adeyami, Fujitsu; Katsushi Suda, Obic	7th 1st
K	Toshiki Sato, IBM	1st
P	Takeru Yamasaki, Elecom Kobe	1st
RET	Sean Draper, Elecom Kobe	1st

==== X1 Area ====
Position	Name	Time(s) selected
C	Kei Nagase, LIXIL	1st
OG	Yugo Nagara, Asahi Soft Drinks; Ian Park, LIXIL	1st 1st
OT	Haruhisa Kurokawa, Asahi Soft Drinks; Shun Daikoku, LIXIL	1st 1st
TE	Hiroyuki Akatsu, Meiji Yasuda	1st
WR	Robert Earl Johnson II, Asahi Soft Drinks; Ryo Kawakami, Nagoya	1st 1st
RB	Jonah Hodges, Asahi Beer; Brandon Berry, Me-Life Fukuoka	1st 1st
QB	Garret Samuel Safron, Asahi Soft Drinks	1st
DT	Wataru Pang, Dentsu Club; Yoshiro Matsuo, Asahi Beer	1st 1st
DE	Yuji Kuramochi, LIXIL; Yusuke Nakazono, Fuji Xerox	1st 1st
MLB	Michael Raymond Taylor Jr., Asahi Soft Drinks	1st
OLB	Kenshiro Oe, Asahi Soft Drinks; Keisuke Nishiyama, Meiji Yasuda	1st 1st
S	Max Look, LIXIL; Koichi Sugimoto, LIXIL	1st 1st
CB	Kodai Okamoto, LIXIL; Brison Burris, Asahi Soft Drinks	1st 1st
K	Daisuke Aoki, LIXIL	6th
P	Yutaro Nagasu, Tokyo MPD	1st
RET	Brison Burris, Asahi Soft Drinks	1st

=== 2020 ===
==== X1 Super ====
Position	Name	Time(s) selected
C	Ichiyo Uesawa, Panasonic	1st
OG	Naoki Usui, Fujitsu; Tomoaki Sakaguchi, Panasonic	2nd
OT	Junpei Shibata, Panasonic; Yutaro Kobayashi, Fujitsu	4th 9th
TE	John Stanton, IBM	7th
WR	Riki Matsui, Fujitsu; Alfonso Onunwor, Elecom Kobe	1st 2nd
RB	Samajie Grant, Fujitsu; Taku Lee, Obic	2nd 2nd
QB	Michael Birdsong, Fujitsu	2nd
DT	Masaki Sato, Obic; Cardell Rawlings, Elecom Kobe	1st 1st
DE	Trashaun Nixon, Fujitsu; James Brooks, IBM	4th 7th
MLB	Shoki Cho, Fujitsu	1st
OLB	Herbert Gamboa, IBM; Yoshiki Tanaka, Nojima Sagamihara	1st 4th
S	Joshua Cox, Panasonic; Bronson Beatty, Obic	1st 3rd
CB	Al-Riwan Adeyami, Fujitsu; Sean Draper, Elecom Kobe	8th 2nd
K	Takeru Yamasaki, Obic	2nd
P	Motoki Yoshida	
RET	Victor Jamal Mitchell, Panasonic	1st

==== X1 Area East ====
Position	Name	Time(s) selected
C	Kohei Kawade, LIXIL	1st
OG	Kiichi Izawa, Asahi Beer; Ian Park, LIXIL	1st 2nd
OT	Hiroteru Kunimatsu, Asahi Beers; Shota Katsumata, Asahi Beer	1st 1st
TE	Atsushi Tanida, Asahi Beer	1st
WR	Seigo Inoguchi, Asahi Beer; Satoshi Ishige, LIXIL	1st 1st
RB	Tyrone Jones, Bullseyes Tokyo; Taro Yoshimitsu, Dentsu Club	1st 1st
QB	Ryosuke Ishii, LIXIL	1st
DT	Wataru Pang, Dentsu Club; Takuro Namiki, Asahi Beer	2nd 1st
DE	Yuji Kuramochi, LIXIL; Joe Mathis, LIXIL	2nd 2nd
MLB	Naoto Yoshihara, Asahi Beer	1st
OLB	Akira Ando, LIXIL; Keisuke Yusuke Sato, LIXIL	2nd 1st
S	Yuki Enomoto, Asahi Beer; Koichi Sugimoto, LIXIL	2nd 2nd
CB	Masaaki Watari, Bullseyes Tokyo; Tasuku Kishimoto, Asahi Beer	1st 1st
K	Yu Hirota, Dentsu Club	1st
P	Kazuma Ando, Asahi Beer	
RET	Shu Yashiro, Bulls Football Club	

==== X1 Area West ====
Position	Name	Time(s) selected
C	Atsushi Kunioka, Asahi Soft Drinks	1st
OG	Shintaro Omachi, Nagoya; Yuta Ina, Nagoya	1st 1st
OT	Haruhisa Kurokawa, Asahi Soft Drinks; Kazuya Ishibashi, AS ONE	2nd 1st
TE	Naoya Takiyama, Asahi Soft Drinks	1st
WR	Akira Kameyama, Asahi Soft Drinks; Donnie King Jr., Me-Life Fukuoka	1st 1st
RB	Yutaka Tatsumi, Asahi Soft Drinks; Hiroshi Kawamura, Nagoya	1st 1st
QB	Garret Samuel Safron, Asahi Soft Drinks	2nd
DT	Ryuji Hara, Me-Life Fukuoka; Hirotoshi Kanzui, AS ONE	1st 1st
DE	Seita Tsujii, Asahi Soft Drinks; Sohei Ueno, Asahi Soft Drinks	1st 1st
MLB	Michael Raymond Taylor Jr., Asahi Soft Drinks	2nd
OLB	Leslie Maruo, Asahi Soft Drinks; Kenichi Morikawa, Me-Life Fukuoka	1st 1st
S	Motoki Koike, Asahi Soft Drinks; Naoto Hirotsune, Asahi Soft Drinks	1st 1st
CB	Hiroya Eriguchi, Me-Life Fukuoka; Brison Burris, Asahi Soft Drinks	1st 2nd
K	Keisuke Taira, Me-Life Fukuoka	1st
P	Itaru Yoshino, Me-Life Fukuoka	1st
RET	Riku Fujita, Nagoya	1st

=== 2021 ===
==== X1 Super ====
Position	Name	Time(s) selected
C	Ichiyo Uesawa, Panasonic	2nd
OG	Soya Okubo, Fujitsu; Tomoaki Sakaguchi, Panasonic	1st 4th
OT	Junpei Shibata, Panasonic; Yutaro Kobayashi, Fujitsu	2nd 10th
TE	John Stanton, IBM	8th
WR	Nnamdi Agude, Tokyo Gas; Teruaki Alfonso Onunwor, Elecom Kobe	1st 3rd
RB	Trashaun Nixon, Fujitsu; Victor Mitchell, Panasonic	5th 2nd
QB	Anthony Lawrence, Panasonic	1st
DT	Takuya Seike, Obic; David Motu, Panasonic	1st 7th
DE	Byron Beatty Jr., Obic; Jebari Reagan, Tokyo Gas	5th 1st
MLB	Kei Naruse, Obic	1st
OLB	Jaboree Williams, Panasonic; Yoshiki Tanaka, Nojima Sagamihara	1st 5th
S	Atsushi Tsuji, Panasonic; Bronson Beatty, Obic	5th 4th
CB	Al-Riwan Adeyami, Fujitsu; Ryo Okuda, Fujitsu	9th 1st
K	Shintaro Saeki, Panasonic	5th
P	Motoki Yoshida, Fujitsu	2nd
RET	Alfonso Onunwor, Elecom Kobe	3rd

==== X1 Area ====
Position	Name	Time(s) selected
C	Atsushi Kunioka, Asahi Soft Drinks	2nd
OG	Kyoshiro Hanada, Asahi Soft Drinks; Ian Park, Deers Football Club	1st 3rd
OT	Taira Shimano, Asahi Beer; Haruhisa Kurokawa, Asahi Soft Drinks	1st 3rd
TE	Hiroyuki Akatsu, Meiji Yasuda	1st
WR	Robert Earl Johnson, Asahi Soft Drinks; Takato Ito, Equal One Fukuoka	2nd 1st
RB	Hiroshi Kawamura, Asahi Beer; Brandon Berry, Equal One Fukuoka	2nd 2nd
QB	Garrett Safron, Asahi Soft Drinks	3rd
DT	Yuji Kuramochi, Deers Football Club; Wataru Pang, Dentsu	3rd 3rd
DE	Keita Gessho, Asahi Beer; Yuki Nakamura, Meiji Yasuda	1st 1st
MLB	Kenshiro Oe, Asahi Soft Drinks	2nd
OLB	Michael Raymond Taylor Jr., Asahi Soft Drinks; Rikiya Yamamoto, Asahi Beer	3rd 1st
S	Brison Burris, Asahi Soft Drinks; Masato Shimanuki, Tokyo MPD	3rd 1st
CB	Kanta Kurotsuchi, Equal One Fukuoka; Masato Shimanuki, Tokyo MPD	1st 1st
K	Shintaro Nishioka, Asahi Soft Drinks	1st
P	Hiroyuk Akatsu, Meiji Yasuda	1st
RET	Yuki Tomizawa, Tokyo MPD	1st

=== 2022 ===
==== X1 Super ====
Position	Name	Time(s) selected
C	Kohei Yamashita, Fujitsu	2nd
OG	Masaya Okubo, Fujitsu; Naoki Usui, Fujitsu	2nd 1st
OT	Keita Takamori, Panasonic; Yuning Kaku, Fujitsu	1st 1st
TE	Holden Huff, Obic	1st
WR	Riki Matsui, Fujitsu; Teruaki Alfonso Onunwor, Elecom Kobe	1st 4th
RB	Trashaun Nixon, Fujitsu; Victor Mitchell, Panasonic	6th 3rd
QB	Tsubasa Takagi, Fujitsu	1st
DT	Takuya Seike, Obic; Masaki Sato, Obic	2nd 1st
DE	Makoto Kajiwara, Panasonic; Joe Mathis, Fujitsu	1st 1st
MLB	Shoki Cho, Fujitsu	1st
OLB	Jaboree Williams, Panasonic; Yu Konishi, Panasonic	2nd 1st
S	Brandon McKinney, Elecom Kobe; Samon Sukegawa, Obic	1st 1st
CB	Al-Riwan Adeyami, Fujitsu; Sean Draper, Obic	10th 3rd
K	Shintaro Saeki, Panasonic	6th
P	Ryo Kondo, IBM	1st
RET	Jhurell Pressley, IBM	1st

==== X1 Area ====
Position	Name	Time(s) selected
C	Tsukasa Yamashita, AS ONE	1st
OG	Ken Matsuda, Dentsu; Shuma Suzuki, Dentsu	1st 1st
OT	Yukihiro Ichikawa, AS ONE; Gaku Yuzawa, Tokyo MPD	1st 1st
TE	Takuto Horinouchi, Fuji Xerox	1st
WR	Kento Minami, Dentsu; Tsukasa Kuwahara, Fuji Xerox	1st 1st
RB	Kento Shibata, Meiji Yasuda; Ryuki Ito, Mitsubishi Corp.	1st 1st
QB	Takafumi Suzuki, Fuji Xerox	1st
DT	Yuki Nakamura, Meiji Yasuda; Yusuke Nakamichi, Meiji Yasuda	2nd 3rd
DE	Riku Miyazaki, Meiji Yasuda; Koji Kamiya, Nagoya	1st 1st
MLB	Naoto Ikeda, Nagoya	1st
OLB	Aruto Masumoto, Fuji Xerox; Takayuki Mizuta, AS ONE	1st 1st
S	Ryohei Imanishi, AS ONE; Keita Yumioka, Dentsu	1st 1st
CB	Kei Sugiyama, Dentsu; Takuya Ushijima, Meiji Yasuda	1st 1st
K	Yu Hirota, Dentsu	1st
P	Hiroyuki Akatsu, Meiji Yasuda	2nd
RET	Atsumu Endo, Dentsu	1st

=== 2023 ===
==== X1 Super ====
Position	Name	Time(s) selected
C	Kohei Yamashita, Fujitsu	3rd
OG	Masaya Okubo, Fujitsu; Naoki Usui, Fujitsu	3rd 2nd
OT	Junichi Ando, Fujitsu; Yuning Kaku, Fujitsu	1st 2nd
TE	Dax Raymond, Panasonic	1st
WR	Riki Matsui, Fujitsu; Boogie Knight, Asahi Soft Drinks; Kanawai Noa, Tokyo Gas	2nd 1st 1st
RB	Trashaun Nixon, Fujitsu	7th
QB	Garrett Safron, Asahi Soft Drinks	1st
DT	Takuya Seike, Obic; Hiroaki Nakazato, Obic	3rd 3rd
DE	Makoto Kajiwara, Panasonic; Matt McClellan, Tokyo Gas	2nd 1st
LB	Shoki Cho, Fujitsu; Kaulana Apelu, Tokyo Gas	2nd 1st
DB	Joshua Cox, Panasonic; Moises Wiseman, Panasonic; Al-Riwan Adeyami, Fujitsu; Hiroki Takaguchi, Obic; Samon Sukegawa, Obic	2nd 1st 11th 1st 2nd
K	Yuto Fukuoka, IBM	1st
P	Masato Kobayashi, Panasonic	1st
RET	Taku Lee, Obic	3rd

==== X1 Area ====
Position	Name	Time(s) selected
C	Kai Makino, FujiFilm	1st
OG	Gaku Yuzawa, Tokyo MPD; Ojiro Higuchi, All Mitsubishi	2nd 1st
OT	Sho Kakurai, FujiFilm; Kodai Tajima, All Mitsubishi	1st 1st
TE	Akimitsu Mori, FujiFilm	1st
WR	Kazuki Kawabata, AS ONE; Tsukasa Kuwahara, FujiFilm; Takehiro Mawatari, Club TRIAX	1st 2nd 1st
RB	Aoi Ito, Tokyo MPD	1st
QB	John Gibbs, All Mitsubishi	1st
DT	Yuki Nakamura, Meiji Yasuda; Hiroya Kobayashi, AS ONE	3rd 1st
DE	Riku Miyazaki, Meiji Yasuda; Maiya Take, All Mitsubishi	2nd 1st
LB	Naoto Ikeda, Nagoya; Ryushi Ando, FujiFilm	2nd 1st
DB	Ryota Arao, All Mitsubishi; Kazumasa Matsuda, All Mitsubishi; Naoya Kuriyama, Nagoya; Masato Mogi, FujiFilm; Ryo Taguchi, Meiji Yasuda	1st 1st 1st 1st 1st
K	Ikuya Ono, FujiFilm	1st
P	Hiroyuki Akatsu, Meiji Yasuda	3rd
RET	Ryuki Ito, Club TRIAX	2nd

=== 2024 ===
==== X1 Super ====
Position	Name	Time(s) selected
C	Kohei Yamashita, Fujitsu	4th
OG	Masaya Okubo, Fujitsu; Tomoaki Sakaguchi, Panasonic	4th 5th
OT	Kei Murata, Obic; Yuning Kaku, Fujitsu	1st 3rd
TE	Holden Huff, Obic	2nd
WR	Boogie Knight, Sekisui; Tay Cunningham, Nojima Sagamihara; Jamal Watanabe, Obic	2nd 1st 1st
RB	Trashaun Nixon, Fujitsu	8th
QB	Garrett Safron, Sekisui	2nd
DT	Jaboree Williams, Panasonic; Keishi Itashiki, Obic	3rd 1st
DE	Makoto Kajiwara, Panasonic; Matt McClellan, Tokyo Gas	3rd 2nd
LB	Shota Aone, Panasonic Impulse; Satoru Takahashi, Obic	1st 1st
DB	Joshua Cox, Panasonic; Moises Wiseman, Panasonic; Yo Yamamoto, Panasonic; Bronson Beatty, Fujitsu; Tre'Vaughn Craig, Sekisui	3rd 2nd 1st 5th 1st
K	Koji Noso, Fujitsu	1st
P	Masato Kobayashi, Panasonic	2nd
RET	Samajie Grant, Fujitsu	3rd

==== X1 Area ====
Position	Name	Time(s) selected
C	Tomoya Taguchi, Tainai	1st
OG	Gaku Yuzawa, Tokyo MPD; Hironori Uematsu, Tainai	3rd 1st
OT	Ryo Abutani, TRIAXIS; Kohei Kawade, Tainai	1st 2nd
TE	Taiki Sakai, Tainai	1st
WR	Kento Minami, Dentsu; Ravon Johnson, Dentsu; Masaki Kudo, Blue Thunders	2nd 1st 1st
RB	Yuito Ikeda, Shinagawa CC Bulleyes	1st
QB	Aaron Ellis, Dentsu	1st
DT	Shuhei Tokonami, Shinagawa CC; Ryosuke Kuwana, Tokyo MPD	1st 1st
DE	Riku Miyazaki, Tainai; Haruki Tsukano, Nagoya	3rd 1st
LB	Kei Koizumi, Blue Thunders; Shunta Yaguchi, Tainai	1st 1st
DB	Takumi Shichijo, Club TRIAX; Takuma Saisho, Tokyo MPD; Shohei Mori, Dentsu; Ryohei Imanishi, AS ONE; Kojiro Masui, PentaOcean	1st 1st 1st 1st 1st
K	Takahiro Kudo, Dentsu	1st
P	Ryoma Yoshizawa, Club TRIAX	1st
RET	Roi Ashida, TRIAXIS	1st

=== 2025 ===
==== X1 Super ====
Position	Name	Time(s) selected
C	Kohei Yamashita, Fujitsu	5th
OG	Masaya Okubo, Fujitsu; Tomoaki Sakaguchi, Panasonic	5th 6th
OT	Kei Murata, Obic; Yuning Kaku, Fujitsu	2nd 4th
TE	Holden Huff, Obic	3rd
WR	Boogie Knight, Sekisui; Tay Cunningham, Nojima Sagamihara; Taiki Uchida, Elecom Kobe	3rd 2nd 1st
RB	Victor Mitchell, Panasonic	4th
QB	Kurt Palandech, Nojima Sagamihara	1st
DT	Yuya Ariumura, Panasonic; Iku Yoshida, Tokyo Gas	1st 1st
DE	Miki Suguturaga, Elecom Kobe; Rintaro Yamada, Obic	1st 1st
LB	Shota Aone, Panasonic Impulse; Philip Redwine, Nojima Sagamihara	2nd 1st
DB	Joshua Cox, Panasonic; Jason Smith, Obic; Kengo Bono, Obic; Bronson Beatty, Fujitsu; Tre'Vaughn Craig, Sekisui	4th 1st 1st 6th 2nd
K	Toshiki Sato, Sekisui	1st
P	Masato Kobayashi, Panasonic	3rd
RET	Isaiah Malcome, All Mitsubishi	1st

==== X1 Area ====
Position	Name	Time(s) selected
C	Tomoya Taguchi, Tainai	2nd
OG	Masahiro Mineo, Tainai; Yuta Ina, Nagoya; Junya Nishitani, Dentsu	1st 1st 1st
OT	Ryo Yutani, TRIAXIS; Kohei Kawade, Tainai; Kota Takahashi, Tainai	1st 3rd 1st
TE	Seiya Atsumi, Tainai	1st
WR	Takao Yuki, TRIAXIS; Ravon Johnson, Dentsu; Masaki Kudo, Blue Thunders	2nd 2nd 2nd
RB	Aoi Ito, Tokyo MPD; Takaru Sakaida, Nagoya	2nd 1st
QB	Kosei Okuno, Dentsu; Akira Nishimoto, Nagoya	1st 1st
DT	Yuki Nakamura, PentaOcean; Mori Kozo, Tainai	4th 1st
DE	Riku Miyazaki, Tainai; Shota Mizoguchi, Nagoya	4th 1st
LB	Iizuka Okuto, Tokyo MPD; Koichi Morita, TRIAXIS	1st 1st
DB	Toshiro Ono, Tainai; Takuma Saisho, Tokyo MPD; Kohei Nakamura, Tainai; Tomoya Izumi, Club TRIAX; Yamato Tomita, AS ONE	1st 2nd 1st 1st 1st
K	Daisuke Aoki, Tainai; Hanaoka Teru, TRIAXIS	1st 1st
P	Ryoma Yoshizawa, Club TRIAX; Yuto Todoroki, AS ONE	2nd 1st
RET	Roi Ashida, TRIAXIS; Takataka Ito, Club TRIAX	2nd 1st
