= Club Hawkeye =

American football team in Osaka, Japan

General information
- Founded: 1989
- Headquartered: Minoh, Osaka
- Colors: Royal Blue and Orange
- Website: http://clubhawkeye.com

Personnel
- General manager: Takuya Furukawa
- Head coach: Nozomu Nishimura

League / conference affiliations
- X-League; West

The Club Hawkeye is an American football team located in Minoh, Osaka, Japan. They are a member of the X-League.

== Seasons ==
X-League champions (1997–present)	Division champions	Final Stage/Semifinals Berth	Wild Card /First Stage Berth

Season	League	Division	Regular Season				Postseason results	Awards	Head coaches
Season	League	Division	Finish	Wins	Losses	Ties	Postseason results	Awards	Head coaches
2009	X2	West	5th	2	5	0			
2010	X2	West	3rd	4	3	0			
2011	X2	West	3rd	3	3	0			
2012	X2	West	2nd	6	2	0			Nozomu Nishimura
2013	X2	West	5th	3	3	1	Won X2-X3 replacement match (at Mie Firebirds) 41-0		Nozomu Nishimura
2014	X2	West	2nd	7	1	1			Nozomu Nishimura
2015	X2	West	3rd	3	2	0			Nozomu Nishimura
2016	X2	West	1st	8	0	0	Won X2-X1 promotion match (at Sidewinders) 19-17		Nozomu Nishimura
2017	X1	West	6th	2	5	1	Lost X1-X2 Demotion match (Sidewinders) 3-17		Nozomu Nishimura
Total				38	24	3	(2009–2017, includes only regular season)		
Total				2	1	0	(2009–2017, includes only playoffs)		
Total				40	25	3	(2009–2017, includes both regular season and playoffs)		
