= Hurricanes (X-League) =

General information
- Founded: 1978
- Headquartered: Kodaira, Tokyo, Japan
- Colours: Red and Gold
- Website: http://hurricanes-afc.rash.jp/

Personnel
- General manager: Atsuyoshi Koike
- Head coach: Kohei Sugimoto

League / conference affiliations
- X-League; Central Division

The Hurricanes are an American football team located in Kodaira, Tokyo, Japan. They are a member of the X-League.

== Team history ==
- 1978 Team founded by Hitachi, Ltd. business group. Team named the Hitachi Hurricanes.
- 1999 Team promoted from X3 to X2.
- 2003 Renesas Electronics becomes new team sponsor. Team renamed the Renesas Hurricanes.
- 2004 Won X2-X1 promotion match against Club Huskies 41-33. Promoted to X1 for the following season.
- 2005 Finished 6th in the Central division (0 wins, 6 losses).
- 2006 Finished 6th in the Central division (0 wins, 6 losses). Won X1-X2 replacement match against Bullseyes-Tokyo 26-0.
- 2009 Renesas Electronics ends sponsorship of the team. Team renamed the Hurricanes. Finished 5th in the Central division (2 wins, 5 losses).
- 2010 Finished 4th in the Central division (2 wins, 6 losses). Lost X1-X2 replacement match against Sagamihara Rise 0-57. Demoted to X2 for the following season.
- 2012 Finished 1st in the X2 East division (9 wins, 0 losses). Won X2-X1 promotion match against Fuji Xerox 20-13. Promoted to X1 for the following season.
- 2015 Finished 6th in the Central division (0 wins, 7 losses). Team demoted to X2 for the following season.

== Seasons ==
| X-League champions (1987–present) | Division champions | Final Stage/Semifinals Berth | Wild Card /First Stage Berth |

| Season | League | Division | Regular Season | | | | Postseason results | Awards | Head coaches |
| Season | League | Division | Finish | Wins | Losses | Ties | Postseason results | Awards | Head coaches |
|---|---|---|---|---|---|---|---|---|---|
| 2005 | X1 | Central | 6th | 0 | 6 | 0 | | | |
| 2006 | X1 | Central | 6th | 0 | 6 | 0 | Won X1-X2 replacement match (Bullseyes-Tokyo) 26-0 | | |
| 2007 | X1 | East | 5th | 1 | 6 | 0 | | | |
| 2008 | X1 | East | 5th | 2 | 6 | 0 | | | |
| 2009 | X1 | Central | 5th | 2 | 5 | 0 | Lost 2nd stage relegation match (Tokyo Gas) 6-24; Won 2nd stage relegation match (All Mitsubishi) 31-14 | | |
| 2010 | X1 | Central | 4th | 2 | 6 | 0 | Lost 2nd stage relegation match (Fuji Xerox) 13-18; Lost 2nd stage relegation match (All Mitsubishi) 0-7; Lost X1-X2 replacement match (Sagamihara Rise) 0-57 | | |
| 2011 | X2 | East | 1st | 4 | 1 | 0 | Lost X2-X1 promotion match (Fuji Xerox) 19-25. | | |
| 2012 | X2 | East | 1st | 9 | 0 | 0 | Won X2-X1 promotion match (Fuji Xerox) 20-13 | | |
| 2013 | X1 | East | 6th | 0 | 7 | 0 | Lost 2nd stage relegation match (at All Mitsubishi) 0-48; Lost 2nd stage relegation match (at Meiji Yasuda) 17-24; Won X1-X2 replacement match (Dentsu) 10-9 | | Kohei Sugimoto |
| 2014 | X1 | East | 6th | 0 | 8 | 0 | Lost 2nd stage relegation match (All Mitsubishi) 0-61; Lost 2nd stage relegation match (at Bulls Football Club) 7-34 | | Kohei Sugimoto |
| 2015 | X1 | Central | 6th | 0 | 7 | 0 | Lost 2nd stage relegation match (All Mitsubishi) 3-70; Lost 2nd stage relegation match (at Meiji Yasuda) 9-27 | | Kohei Sugimoto |
| Total | | | | | | | (2005–2015, includes only regular season) | | |
| Total | | | | | | | (2005–2015, includes only playoffs) | | |
| Total | | | | | | | (2005–2015, includes both regular season and playoffs) | | |
