= Keishichou Eagles =

American football team in Japan

General information
- Founded: 1971
- Headquartered: Koto, Tokyo, Japan
- Colors: Navy Blue and Silver

Personnel
- Head coach: Shinichi Taguchi

League / conference affiliations
- X-League; East Division

The Keishichou Eagles are an American football team located in the Koto, Tokyo, Japan. They are a member of the X-League. The team is sponsored by the Tokyo Metropolitan Police Department (警視庁, Keishichō) and each player is a police officer with the department.

== Seasons ==
X-League champions (1987–present)	Division champions	Final Stage/Semifinals Berth	Wild Card /First Stage Berth

Season	League	Division	Regular Season				Post Season Results	Awards	Head coaches
Season	League	Division	Finish	Wins	Losses	Ties	Post Season Results	Awards	Head coaches
2009	X2	East	3rd	6	2	0			
2010	X2	East	2nd	7	2	0	Lost X2 Semi-Final match (Warriors) 7-14; Lost X2-X1 Promotion match (Fuji Xerox) 0-14		
2011	X2	East	2nd	2	2	0	Lost X2-X1 promotion match (Nihon Unisys) 10-27		
2012	X2	East	1st	6	1	0	Won X2-X1 promotion match (Bullseyes-Tokyo) 9-6 OT		
2013	X1	Central	6th	0	7	0	Lost 2nd stage relegation match (at Tokyo Gas) 7-22; Lost 2nd stage match (at Nihon Unisys) 18-24; Lost X1-X2 replacement game(Sun Building Mgmt.) 16-17		Yoshitaka Waga
2014	X2	East	1st	6	1	0	Won X2 Semi-finals match (Warriors) 28-6; Won X2-X1 promotion match (at Sun Building Mgmt.) 29–14.		Yoshitaka Waga
2015	X1	East	6th	1	5	1	Won 2nd stage relegation match (Bulls Football Club) 24-17; Lost 2nd stage relegation match (at Tokyo Gas) 28-31; Won X1-X2 replacement match (Dentsu) 20-14 OT		Yoshitaka Waga
2016	X1	East	5th	2	4	0			Yoshitaka Waga
2017	X1	East	6th	3	6	0	Lost X1-X2 Replacement match (Dentsu Club) 14-17 OT		Yoshitaka Waga
2018	X2	East	1st	6	1	0			Yoshitaka Waga
2019	X1 Area	Central		1	5	0			Yoshitaka Waga
2020	X1 Area	Central		0	0	0	Did not field team due to COVID-19 pandemic.		Yoshitaka Waga
2021	X1 Area	East	2nd	4	2	0			Koichi Terashima
2022	X1 Area		4th	6	3	0			Kosuke Sato
2023	X1 Area		3rd	5	4	0			Kosuke Sato
2024	X1 Area	East	3rd	4	4	0			Tomoaki Shibuya
2025	X1 Area	East	2nd	5	3	0			Shinichi Taguchi
Total				56	39	1	(2009–2025, includes only regular season)		
Total				5	7	0	(2009–2025, includes only playoffs)		
Total				61	46	1	(2009–2025, includes both regular season and playoffs)		
