= Colby Cameron =

American football player (born 1990)

Profile
- Position: Quarterback

Personal information
- Born: April 5, 1990 (age 36); Newbury Park, California, U.S.
- Listed height: 6 ft 4 in (1.93 m)
- Listed weight: 210 lb (95 kg)

Career information
- High school: Newbury Park (CA)
- College: Louisiana Tech
- NFL draft: 2013: undrafted

Career history
- Carolina Panthers (2013)*; Fujitsu Frontiers (2014–2018)
- * Offseason or practice squad member only

Awards and highlights
- X League: 3× Japan X Bowl champion (XXVIII, XXX, XXXI); 3× Rice Bowl champion (68, 70, 71); Paul Rusch Cup (2017); First-team All-X-League (2014, 2016); X-League Rookie of the Year (2014); X-League MVP (2016); College: Sammy Baugh Trophy (2012); WAC Offensive Player of the Year (2012); First-team All-WAC (2012)
- Stats at Pro Football Reference

Colby Cameron (born April 5, 1990) is an American professional football quarterback who played for the Fujitsu Frontiers of the X-League. He played college football at Louisiana Tech University.

== Early life ==
Cameron was born in Newbury Park, California, to Stan and Cathy Cameron. His brother Jordan played tight end for the Miami Dolphins. His sister Brynn played basketball at USC. His cousin is former Denver Broncos' and Washington Football Team' safety Su'a Cravens. Cameron played high school football at Newbury Park High School. In his final two seasons he passed for nearly 5,000 yards and 47 touchdowns. In his senior season, Cameron led the Newbury Park Panthers to the Co-Marmonte League Title with the Westlake Warriors and the California Division II High School semifinals.

== Collegiate career ==
Cameron redshirted in his freshman year at Louisiana Tech and played on the scout team.

He played sparingly in his second season at Louisiana Tech. He played in five games throughout the season passing for 142 yards on 14 completions. He also ran the ball 5 times for 20 yards.

Cameron started in 3 games in his sophomore season while splitting time with fellow quarterback Tarik Hakmi. During the 2010 season, Cameron completed 54 of 91 passes for 461 yards and a touchdown. He also had an onside kick recovery against San Jose State.

Prior to his junior season in 2011, his head coach, Sonny Dykes said that, "Cameron is not only light years ahead of where he was a year ago, but also ahead of any of Tech's quarterbacks from the 2010 spring."

In 2012, Cameron set the NCAA record for most consecutive pass attempts in a single season without an interception. On November 10, 2012, Cameron broke Russell Wilson's NCAA record of 379 consecutive pass attempts in a career without an interception against Texas State with his 6th pass attempt of the night.

Following his senior season in 2012, Cameron was awarded the Sammy Baugh Trophy as the nation's top passer.

== Professional career ==
=== Carolina Panthers ===
Cameron went undrafted in the 2013 NFL draft. He was signed shortly after the draft by the Carolina Panthers on April 29, 2013. On August 24, 2013, he was waived by the Panthers.

=== Fujitsu Frontiers ===
==== 2014 ====
Cameron worked in human resources for Fujitsu Ltd. in Japan while playing for the company's team, the Fujitsu Frontiers of the X-League. Wearing jersey number 3, Cameron started his first game completing 12 of 14 for 179 yards and 3 touchdowns, leading the team to rout the Hurricanes 93–0 on Sunday, May 4, 2014, in the preliminary round of the Pearl Bowl preseason tournament at Kawasaki Fujimi Stadium.

During the second round, Cameron completed 20 out of 27 passes including 2 fourth quarter touchdowns that helped secure a 48–7 victory over the Asahi Beer Silver Star to clinch a place in the semifinals of the Pearl Bowl tournament.

Despite wet and sloppy playing conditions, Cameron passed for 247 yards and 3 touchdowns, while rushing for another touchdown, leading the Frontiers to a 45–28 win over the defending Pearl Bowl champion LIXIL Deers. The Frontiers advanced to the championship game against the Obic Seagulls on June 23 in the Tokyo Dome.

In the Pearl Bowl final, Cameron struggled against the Obic Seagulls defense led by American defensive ends Kevin Jackson and BJ Beatty Jr. He completed 17 out of 32 for 172 yards with 1 touchdown and 1 interception. He was also sacked twice as the Obic Seagulls executed a comeback drive during the last 2:03 of regulation which ended with a 19-yard touchdown pass from Obic QB Shun Sugawara to RB Takuya Furutani on the final play of the game to tie the score at 28–28. After missing the PAT, the game went into overtime with both teams scoring field goals on their possessions. During the second overtime period, Fujitsu failed to get a first down and settled for a field goal. Obic moved to the 8-yard line in three plays, then Sugawara took it in himself on a quarterback draw, diving at the goal line to lift the Seagulls to a 37–34 2-overtime victory over the Fujitsu Frontiers.

During the 1st Stage, Cameron was second in the league behind IBM Big Blue's Kevin Craft for passing yards throwing for 1,108 yards with a 66.1 completion percentage, 18 touchdowns and 2 interceptions. He also rushed for 194 yards and 4 touchdowns leading the team to a 5–0 regular-season record and a 1st-place finish in the Eastern Division going into the 2nd stage.

On November 16, 2014, Cameron and the Frontiers went against the Panasonic Impulse, the Western Division runner-up in their second 2nd stage game. Cameron threw for an X-League career-high 445 yards with 4 touchdowns and 1 interception to lead the Frontiers to a 48–28 victory. The victory alongside the Frontier's previous win over the Central Division 3rd-place Asahi Beer Silver Star assured them a spot in the Final Stage with their next opponent standing in their way before the Japan X Bowl being the Obic Seagulls. Fujitsu beat the Obic Seagulls 27–14 ending the Seagulls' four-year championship run. Cameron completed 28 of 40 passes for 280 yards and two touchdowns while scoring another rushing to guide his team to its first win over the Seagulls in the fall season since 2007. The Frontiers advanced to the Japan X Bowl for the first time in franchise history to take on IBM Big Blue in the Tokyo Dome on December 15 with both teams competing for their first league title.

Cameron started for the Frontiers during the Japan X Bowl against the IBM Big Blue. He completed 13 out of 21 passes for 115 yards during the first half before an injury forced him to sit out the remainder of the game. Second-string quarterback Keiya Hiramoto filled in Cameron's spot in the 2nd half as the Frontiers routed the Big Blue 44–10 for their first X League title in franchise history. Cameron sat out during the Rice bowl national championship game on January 3, 2015, that resulted in a comeback 33–24 victory by the Frontiers over the collegiate champion Kwansei Gakuin University Fighters.

Cameron finished the 2014 season for the Frontiers accumulating 3,045 passing yards with a 67.1 completion percentage rate, 33 touchdowns and 6 interceptions. He also had 331 rushing yards along with 6 touchdowns. For his efforts, Cameron was awarded the 2014 X League Rookie of the Year award and was selected to the 2014 All X League Class alongside teammates RB Gino Gordon, LG Shun Mochizuki, LT Yutaro Kobayashi, WR Clark Nakamura, LB Shoichiro Suzuki, CB Alriwan Adeyami, S Shinya Miki and P/K Tsuyoshi Nishimura.

==== 2015 ====
On October 3, 2015, Cameron completed 26 of 39 passes for 294 yards and two touchdowns while the Fujitsu defense limited Nojima Sagamihara's new import Quarterback Benjamin Anderson to just 144 yards total offense en route to a 37–10 victory at Fujitsu Stadium Kawasaki. This would bring the Frontiers to overall record to 4–0 and a match up against rival team the Obic Seagulls for the Eastern Division title.

==== 2016 ====
Cameron would lead the Frontiers to a 1st-place finish in the Eastern division. They eventually made it to the Japan X Bowl where they defeated the Obic Seagulls 16–3 to claim the 2nd X-League Championship in Fujitsu's history as a franchise. Cameron would lead the team into the 70th Rice Bowl national championship game against the Japanese College champion the Kwansei Gakuin University Fighters. Cameron finished the game completing 20 out of 27 passes for 311 yards as he led the Frontiers to a solid 30–13 victory. For his efforts, Cameron was named the MVP of the game and was presented with the Paul Rusch Cup given to the best American football player in Japan. He was also named the league MVP for the 2016 season.

=== Statistics ===
==== Regular season ====
Year	Team	G	GS	W – L	Passing								Rushing				Sacked		Fumbles	
Year	Team	G	GS	W – L	Comp	Att	Pct	Yds	Y/A	TD	Int	Rtg	Att	Yds	Avg	TD	Sack	Yds	Fum	Lost
2014	FUJITSU	9	9	8–1	142	217	65.4	1,914	8.8	25	5	122.2	51	312	6.1	5	4	30	3	2
2015	FUJITSU	5	5	5–0	94	135	69.6	2,672	19.8	20	1	188.9	12	77	6.4	1	2	13	1	1
2016	FUJITSU	9	6	5–1	91	141	64.5	993	7.0	11	4		29	61	2.1	0	5	36	3	1
2017	FUJITSU	5	5	4–1	78	128	60.9	958	7.5	10	6		32	133	4.2	1	6	39	4	2
	Total	28	25	22–3	405	621	65.2	6,537	10.5	66	16		124	583	4.7	7	17	118	11	6

==== Postseason ====
Year	Team	G	GS	W – L	Passing								Rushing				Sacked		Fumbles	
Year	Team	G	GS	W – L	Comp	Att	Pct	Yds	Y/A	TD	Int	Rtg	Att	Yds	Avg	TD	Sack	Yds	Fum	Lost
2014	FUJITSU	5	4	4–0	80	114	70.2	1,131	9.9	8	1	121.7	14	19	1.4	1	4	41	2	2
2015	FUJITSU	4	4	3–1	109	163	66.9	1,284	7.9	11	5	100.4	24	127	5.3	0	2	18	2	1
2016	FUJITSU	4	4	4–0	65	101	64.4	858	8.5	5	1		34	126	3.7	0	8	82	1	1
2017	FUJITSU	4	4	4–0	74	110	67.3	962	8.8	9	2		28	148	5.3	3	2	15	2	1
	Total	17	16	15–1	328	488	67.2	4,235	8.7	33	9		100	420	4.2	4	16	156	7	5
