= Bulls (X-League) =

Bulls Football Club

General information
- Founded: 1985
- Headquartered: Asaka, Saitama, Japan
- Colors: Red, Black and White
- Website: https://www.bullsfootballclub.com/

Personnel
- Owner: Nobuyoshi Suzuki
- General manager: Toshihiko Kato
- Head coach: Shota Homma

League / conference affiliations
- X-League; Central Division

The Bulls Football Club are an American football team located in Asaka, Saitama, Japan. They are a member of the X-League.

== Team history ==
- 1981 Team founded by former Nihon University American football players and staff.
- 1999 Joined the X-League X3 league.
- 2004 Team named changed from Wako Securities Bulls to Nihon Unisys Bulls. Began operating as a club team.
- 2006 Promoted from X3 to X2.
- 2009 Promoted from X2 to X1. Finished 3rd in the East division (3 wins, 2 losses). Advanced to the 2nd stage. Lost 2nd stage matches to Fujitsu 0-61 and Asahi Soft Drinks 13–55.
- 2013 Following the addition of new multiple team sponsors, team is renamed the Bulls Football Club.

== Seasons ==
X-League champions (1987–present)	Division champions	Final Stage/Semifinals Berth	Wild Card /2nd Stage Berth

Season	League	Division	Regular Season				Postseason results	Awards	Head coaches
Season	League	Division	Finish	Wins	Losses	Ties	Postseason results	Awards	Head coaches
2009	X1	East	3rd	3	3	0	Lost 2nd stage match (Fujitsu) 0-61; Lost 2nd stage match (Asahi Soft Drinks) 13-55		
2010	X1	East	6th	1	7	0	Lost 2nd stage relegation match (All Mitsubishi) 14-27; Won 2nd stage relegation match (Bullseyes-Tokyo) 62-6		
2011	X1	East	6th	1	6	0	Won 2nd stage relegation match (Meiji Yasuda) 33-6; Lost 2nd stage relegation match (Bullseyes-Tokyo) 14-17; Won X2-X1 Replacement game (Tokyo MPD) 27-10		
2012	X1	East	5th	1	6	0	Won 2nd stage relegation match (Fuji Xerox) 10-9; Lost 2nd stage relegation match (All Mitsubishi) 27-30		Nobuyoshi Suzuki
2013	X1	East	5th	1	6	0	Won 2nd stage relegation match (Tokyo MPD) 22-7; Lost 2nd stage relegation match (Meiji Yasuda) 15-22		Nobuyoshi Suzuki
2014	X1	Central	5th	2	6	0	Won 2nd stage relegation match (Hurricanes) 34-7; Lost 2nd stage relegation match (at Meiji Yasuda) 39-44		Nobuyoshi Suzuki
2015	X1	Central	4th	4	3	0	Lost 2nd stage relegation match (Tokyo MPD) 17-24; Lost 2nd stage relegation match (All Mitsubishi) 21-52		Nobuyoshi Suzuki
2016	X1	East	6th	1	8	0			Nobuyoshi Suzuki
2017	X1	Central	6th	0	9	0	Won X1-X2 Demotion match (Bullseyes Tokyo) 31-20		Nobuyoshi Suzuki
2018	X1	Central	6th	1	8	0			Yuto Numata
2019	X2	Central	1st	0	0	0	Won X2-X1 Promotion match (AFC Cranes) 37-0		Yuto Numata
2020	X1 Area	Central	N/A	0	3	0			Yuto Numata
2021	X1 Area	Central	4th	0	6	0	Lost X1 Area-X2 relegation match (Mitsubishi Club TRIAX) 7-28		Shota Homma
Total							(1988–2021, includes only regular season)		
Total							(1988–2021, includes only playoffs)		
Total							(1988–2021, includes both regular season and playoffs)		

== Import players ==
Current

Jersey #	Name	Position	Years with the team	Alma mater	Achievements

Former

Name	Position	Years with the team	Alma mater	Achievements
Jeff Knelsen	LB	2018	Westwood Community HS	
David Newell	WR	2018	Carlsbad HS	
Andrew Gonzales	LB	2017–18	Oregon State	
Aaron Carbury	OT	2015	Sydney	
