= Bullseyes-Tokyo =

General information
- Founded: 1993
- Headquartered: Minato, Tokyo
- Colors: Blue, White and Red
- Website: http://www.bullseyes.net/

Personnel
- Head coach: Takuya Yagi

League / conference affiliations
- X-League; Central Division

The Bullseyes-Tokyo are an American football team located in Minato, Tokyo, Japan. They are a member of the X-League.

== Team history ==
- 1993 Team Founded. First played in the independent I-League
- 1994 Joined the X-League X3 division.
- 1997 Won Metropolitan Division title. (6 wins, 0 losses)
- 1998 Junior X Conference transition tournament. (1 win, 3 losses)
- 2001 X3 Central championship. (4 wins, 1 loss) Won X3-X2 replacement game.
- 2005 X2 East Championship. (5 wins, 0 losses) Lost X2-X1 replacement game.
- 2008 X2 Central championship. (5 wins, 0 losses) Promoted from X2 to X1 after the withdrawal of Rockbull from X1.
- 2009 X1 Central 6th place. (0 wins, 7 losses)
- 2012 X1 East 6th place. (1 win, 6 losses). Loses replacement game to Tokyo MPD Eagles. Demoted to X2.
- 2015 Promoted from X2 to X1 for the following season.

== Seasons ==
X-League champions (1987–present)	Division champions	Final Stage/Semifinals Berth	Wild Card /First Stage Berth

Season	League	Division	Regular Season				Postseason results	Awards	Head coaches
Season	League	Division	Finish	Wins	Losses	Ties	Postseason results	Awards	Head coaches
2009	X1	Central	6th	0	7	0	Lost 2nd stage relegation match (All Mitsubishi) 0-24; Lost 2nd stage relegation match (Fuji Xerox) 10-14; Won X1-X2 replacement match (Dentsu) 13-7		
2010	X1	East	5th	1	7	0	Lost 2nd stage relegation match (Nihon Unisys) 6-42; Lost 2nd stage relegation match (Tokyo Gas) 0-31		
2011	X1	East	5th	1	6	0	Won 2nd stage relegation match (Nihon Unisys) 17-14; Lost 2nd stage relegation match (Tokyo Gas) 14-28		
2012	X1	East	6th	1	6	0	Lost 2nd stage relegation match (Tokyo Gas)14-36; Lost 2nd stage relegation match (at All Mitsubishi) 0-12; Lost X1-X2 replacement match (Tokyo MPD) 6-9 OT		Mitsuru Taisha
2013	X2	Central	2nd	5	2	0	Won X2 Semi-finals match (Sony) 21-14		Mitsuru Taisha
2014	X2	East	2nd	4	2	0	Lost X2 Semi-finals match (Fuji Xerox) 0-17		Mitsuru Taisha
2015	X2	East	1st	5	0	0	Won X2-X1 promotion match (Fuji Xerox)		Mitsuru Taisha
2016	X1	Central	6th	2	7	0	Lost X1-X2 replacement match (at Fuji Xerox) 7-27		Mitsuru Taisha
2017	X2	Central	1st	5	2	0	Lost X2-X1 Promotion match (Bulls Football Club) 20-31		Mitsuru Taisha
2018	X2	Central	1st	5	2	0			Mitsuru Taisha
2019	X1 Area	Central	4th	5	5	0			Mitsuru Taisha
2020	X1 Area	East	4th	1	2	0			Mitsuru Taisha
2021	X1 Area	Central	3rd	1	5	0	Won X1 Area-X2 Relegation match (Club Hawkeye) 21-16		Kazuhiro Takemoto
2022	X1 Area		8th	1	8	0	Won X1 Area-X2 Relegation match (Blue Thunders) 17-3		Kazuhiro Takemoto
2023	X1 Area		8th	2	7	0			Takuya Yagi
2024	X1 Area	East	2nd	3	4	1			Takuya Yagi
2025	X1 Area	East	3rd	3	5	0			Takuya Yagi
Total							(2009–2022, includes only regular season)		
Total							(2009–2022, includes only playoffs)		
Total							(2009–2022, includes both regular season and playoffs)		
