= Pleiades Fukuoka Suns =

Japanese American football team

General information
- Founded: 2017
- Headquartered: Hakata-ku, Fukuoka, Japan
- Colors: Red, gold & white
- Website: https://fukuoka-suns.net/

Personnel
- General manager: Saito Kaku
- Head coach: Toru Yoshino

League / conference affiliations
- X-League; X1 Area West Division

The Pleiades Fukuoka Suns are an American football team located in Hakata-ku, Fukuoka Japan. They are a member of the X-League.

== Team history ==
- 2017 team founded as the Fukuoka Suns. Finished first in the X3 West division (6 wins, 0 losses).
- 2018 team name changed to Opatsu Fukuoka Suns. Finished first in X2 West division (5 wins, 0 losses). Defeated Sidewinders in X2-X1 promotion match 22-7
- 2019 team name changed to Me-Life Fukuoka Suns
- 2021 team name changed to Equal One Fukuoka Suns
- 2022 team name changed to otonari Fukuoka Suns
- 2024 team name changed to Pleiades Fukuoka Suns

== Seasons ==
X-League champions (1987–present)	Division champions	Final Stage/Semifinals Berth	Wild Card /First Stage Berth

Season	Division	Regular Season				Post Season Results	Awards	Head coaches
Season	Division	Finish	Wins	Losses	Ties	Post Season Results	Awards	Head coaches
2017	X3 West	1st	6	0	0	Won X3-X2 promotion match (Fuji Xerox J-Stars)		Toru Yoshino
2018	X2 West	1st	5	0	0	Won X2-X1 promotion match (Sidewinders) 22-7		Toru Yoshino
2019	X1 Area West	2nd	5	3	0			Toru Yoshino
2020	X1 Area West	2nd	1	1	0			Toru Yoshino
2021	X1 Area West	2nd	5	1	0			Toru Yoshino
2022	X1 Super Div. B	6th	0	6	0	Won X1 Super/Area exchange match (PentaOcean Pirates) 14-9		Toru Yoshino
2023	X1 Super Div. B	5th	1	6	0	Lost X1 Super Ranking match (Dentsu) 28-30		Toru Yoshino
2024	X1 Super	12th	0	6	0	Won X1 Super/Area exchange match (AS ONE) 34-20		Toru Yoshino
2025	X1 Super West	4th	1	6	0			Toru Yoshino
Total			24	31	0	(2017–2025, includes only regular season)		
Total			4	1	0	(2017–2025, includes only playoffs)		
Total			28	32	0	(2017–2025, includes both regular season and playoffs)		

== Current import players ==
Jersey #	Name	Position	Years with the team	Alma mater	Achievements
#4	Ben von Jagow	WR	2025–present	San Diego State University	
#91	Pai'ea Mikaela	DT	2025–present	Eastern Washington University	
#97	Nick Patterson	DE	2026- present	Mercy University	

Former import players

Name	Position	Years with the team	Alma mater	Achievements
Ben von Jagaw	WR	2024	Western University	
Minsok Lee	OL	2023	Pittsburg State	
Robbie Wallace	LB	2023	Wingate	
Daniel Wise	RB	2022	Colorado State-Pueblo	
Edward Germany	RB	2022	Texas A&M University	
Brandon Berry	OLB/RB	2019–2021	Buffalo	2x All X1-Area Team member (2019, 2021)
Donnie King Jr.	WR	2018–2021	Hawai'i	All X1-Area team member (2020)
Richard Ellebie	DT	2019	Westminster (PA)	
