= All Mitsubishi Lions =

American football team in Japan

Logo

General information
- Founded: 2001
- Headquartered: Hachioji, Tokyo
- Colors: Navy Blue and Gold
- Website: http://lions.vc/

Personnel
- Head coach: Akira Hayashi

League / conference affiliations
- X-League; X1 Super Division

The All Mitsubishi Lions are an American football team located in Hachiōji, Tokyo, Japan. They are a member of the X-League.

== Team history ==
- 2001 Team founded. First named the Lions Finished 4th in the Central division (2 wins, 3 losses).
- 2002 Finished 3rd in the East Division (3 wins, 2 losses).
- 2003 New sponsorship with Mitsubishi Electric. Team renamed the All Mitsubishi Lions. Finished 4th in the Central Division (1 win, 3 losses, 1 tie).
- 2004 Finished 3rd in the East division (1 win, 2 losses, 2 ties).
- 2010 Finished 4th in the East division (2 wins, 3 losses).
- 2011 Finished 3rd in the East division (3 wins, 2 losses). Advanced to the 2nd stage Super9 for the first time in team history. Lost 2nd stage matches to Obic 0-49 and to Asahi Soft Drinks 3-24.
- 2012 Finished 5th in the Central division (1 win, 4 losses).
- 2013 Finished 4th in the Central division (2 wins, 3 losses). Qualified for the 2nd stage Battle9. Advanced to the Battle9 Final where they defeated the Elecom Kobe Finies 24–21.
- 2014 Finished 4th in the Central division (2 wins, 3 losses). Advanced to the Battle9 Final where they defeated the As One Black Eagles 35–10.
- 2015 Finished 4th in the East division (2 wins, 3 losses). Advanced to the Battle9 Final for the 3rd consecutive year where they defeated the As One Black Eagles 24–21.

== Name ==
From 2001 to 2002, the team was simply known as the Lions. Beginning in 2003, the team became sponsored by Mitsubishi and thus were renamed the All Mitsubishi Lions.

== Seasons ==
X-League champions (1987–present)	Division champions	Final Stage/Semifinals Berth	Wild Card /2nd Stage Berth

Season	Division	Regular Season				Postseason results	Awards	Head coaches
Season	Division	Finish	Wins	Losses	Ties	Postseason results	Awards	Head coaches
2007	East	4th	2	3	0			
2008	Central	4th	3	5	0			
2009	East	4th	2	5	0	Won 2nd stage relegation match (Bullseyes-Tokyo) 24-0; Lost 2nd stage relegation match (Hurricanes AFC) 14-31		
2010	East	4th	3	5	0	Won 2nd stage relegation match (Nihon Unisys) 27-14; Won 2nd stage relegation match (Hurricanes AFC) 7-0		
2011	East	3rd	3	4	0	Lost 2nd stage match (Obic) 0-49; Lost 2nd stage match ( Asahi Soft Drinks) 3-24		
2012	Central	5th	2	5	0	Won 2nd stage relegation match (Bullseyes-Tokyo) 12-0; Won 2nd stage relegation match (at Nihon Unisys) 30-27		Akira Hayashi
2013	Central	4th	3	5	0	Won 2nd stage relegation match (Hurricanes) 48-0; Won 2nd stage relegation match (at Tokyo Gas) 28-7; Won Battle9 Final (Elecom Kobe) 24-21		Akira Hayashi
2014	Central	4th	3	5	0	Won 2nd stage relegation match (Hurricanes) 61-0; Won 2nd stage relegation match (at Tokyo Gas) 42-17; Won Battle9 Final (at As One) 35-10		Akira Hayashi
2015	East	4th	2	4	1	Won 2nd stage relegation match (Hurricanes) 70-3; Won 2nd Stage relegation match (Bulls Football Club) 52-21; Won Battle9 Final (As One) 24-21		Akira Hayashi
2016	East	4th	6	3	0	Lost Wildcard match (at Asahi Soft Drinks) 6-20; Lost Battle9/Super9 classification match (at Asahi Beer) 0-17		Akira Hayashi
2017	Central	4th	6	3	0	Won Wildcard match (at Asahi Beer) 20-17; Lost Quarterfinals match (at Panasonic) 3-20		Akira Hayashi
2018	East	4th	4	6	0	Won Wildcard match (at Asahi Beer) 17-6; Lost Quarterfinals match (at Fujitsu) 7-35		Akira Hayashi
2019	X1 Super	8th	2	8	0			Akira Hayashi
2020	X1 Super	N/A	0	0	0	Did not field team due to COVID-19 pandemic.		Akira Hayashi
2021	X1 Super	N/A	0	3	0	Opted out for first 4 weeks of the season due to COVID-19 concerns.		Akira Hayashi
2022	X1 Super Div. A	6th	0	8	0	Lost X1 Super/Area Exchange match (Dentsu) 15-28		Akira Hayashi
2023	X1 Area	1st	7	2	0	Won X1 Super/Area Replacement match (Tainai) 31-17	John Gibbs (X1 Area MVP)	Akira Hayashi
2024	X1 Super	11th	0	8	0	Won X1 Super/Area Replacement match (Dentsu) 44-17		Akira Hayashi
2025	X1 Super East	4th	2	6	0			Akira Hayashi
Total			50	86	1	(2007–2025, includes only regular season)		
Total			18	8	0	(2007–2025, includes only playoffs)		
Total			68	93	1	(2007–2025, includes both regular season and playoffs)		

== Current import players ==
Jersey #	Name	Position	Years with the team	Alma mater	Achievements
#30	Isaiah Malcome	RB/RS	2025–present	University of Pennsylvania	All X1 Super team member (2025)

Former import players

Name	Position	Years with the team	Alma mater	Achievements
Mo Hasan	QB	2024	University of Southern California	
Samuel Oram-Jones	RB	2024	University of Southern California	
John Gibbs Jr.	QB	2022–2023	Alcorn State University	X1 Area MVP (2023); All X1 Area Team member (2023)
Paul Boyette Jr.	DT	2021–2022	University of Texas at Austin	
