= Fujifilm Ebina Minerva AFC =

American football team in Ebina, Kanagawa, Japan

Fujifilm Ebina Minerva

General information
- Founded: 1975
- Headquartered: Ebina, Kanagawa, Japan
- Colors: Red and White
- Website: https://www.minerva-afc.com/

Personnel
- General manager: Takao Matsui
- Head coach: Takao Asakura

Team history
- Fuji Xerox Minerva (–2022); Fujifilm Ebina Minerva (2023–present)

League / conference affiliations
- X-League X1; East Division

The Fujifilm Ebina Minerva AFC (富士フイルム海老名Minerva AFC) are an American football team located in Ebina, Kanagawa, Japan. After four years in the X2 league, the team was promoted to the X-League X2 division for 2017.

It was previously known as Fuji Xerox Minerva before rebranding to the current identity in 2023.

== Seasons ==
| X-League champions (1987–present) | Division champions | Final Stage/Semifinals Berth | Wild Card /2nd Stage Berth |

| Season | League | Division | Regular Season | | | | Postseason results | Awards | Head coaches |
| Season | League | Division | Finish | Wins | Losses | Ties | Postseason results | Awards | Head coaches |
|---|---|---|---|---|---|---|---|---|---|
| 2009 | X1 | East | 5th | 1 | 6 | 0 | Won 2nd stage relegation match (Bullseyes-Tokyo) 14–10; Lost 2nd stage relegation match (Meiji Yasuda) 13–22 | | |
| 2010 | X1 | East | 6th | 1 | 6 | 0 | Won 2nd stage relegation match (Nihon Unisys) 18–13; Lost 2nd stage relegation match (All Tokyo Gas) 7–31; Won X1-X2 replacement match (Tokyo MPD) 14–0 | | |
| 2011 | X1 | East | 6th | 0 | 7 | 0 | Lost 2nd stage relegation match (at IBM) 14–70; Lost 2nd stage relegation match (at All Tokyo Gas) 28–41; Won X1-X2 replacement match (Hurricanes AFC) 25–19 | | |
| 2012 | X1 | Central | 6th | 0 | 7 | 0 | Lost 2nd stage relegation match (at Meiji Yasuda) 7–72; Lost 2nd stage relegation match (at Nihon Unisys) 9–10; Lost X1-X2 replacement match ( Hurricanes AFC) 13–20 | | Ichiro Narushima |
| 2013 | X2 | Central | 3rd | 5 | 1 | 2 | Won X2 2nd stage relegation match (at Warriors) 24–0 | | Ichiro Narushima |
| 2014 | X2 | East | 3rd | 6 | 2 | 0 | Won X2 2nd stage relegation match (Bullseyes-Tokyo) 17–0 | | Ichiro Narushima |
| 2015 | X2 | Central | 1st | 8 | 1 | 0 | Lost X2-X1 promotion match (Bullseyes-Tokyo) 13–21 | | Ichiro Narushima |
| 2016 | X2 | Central | 2nd | 6 | 1 | 0 | Won X2-X1 promotion match (Bullseyes-Tokyo) 27–7 | | Ichiro Narushima |
| 2017 | X1 | East | 4th | 3 | 7 | 0 | | | Takao Kaohara |
| 2018 | X1 | Central | 5th | 3 | 6 | 0 | | | Shinichiro Sugawara |
| 2019 | X1 Area | East | 2nd | 5 | 4 | 0 | | | Shinichiro Sugawara |
| 2020 | X1 Area | East | 5th | 1 | 2 | 0 | | | Shinichiro Sugawara |
| 2021 | X1 Area | East | 4th | 1 | 5 | 0 | | | Shinichiro Sugawara |
| 2022 | X1 Area | | 3rd | 5 | 2 | 0 | | | Takao Asakura |
| 2023 | X1 Area | | 2nd | 9 | 2 | 0 | Won X1 Area/X1 Super promotion match (Dentsu) 17–10 | | Takao Asakura |
| 2024 | X1 Super | | 10th | 0 | 6 | 2 | Won X1 Area/X1 Super relegation match (Tainai) 20–17 | | Takao Asakura |
| 2025 | X1 Super | Central | 4th | 1 | 7 | 0 | | | Takao Asakura |
| Total | | | | 55 | 72 | 4 | (2009–2025, includes only regular season) | | |
| Total | | | | 9 | 8 | 0 | (2009–2025, includes only playoffs) | | |
| Total | | | | 64 | 80 | 4 | (2009–2025, includes both regular season and playoffs) | | |

== Current import players ==
| Jersey # | Name | Position | Years with the team | Alma mater | Achievements |
|---|---|---|---|---|---|
| #1 | Chevan Cordeiro | QB | 2025–present | San Jose State University | |
| #50 | Terrance Lane | DL | 2025–present | Brown University | |

Former import players

| Name | Position | Years with the team | Alma mater | Achievements |
|---|---|---|---|---|
| Solomon Brown | DL | 2024 | Clemson University | |
| Ian Park | LT | 2024 | Northwestern University | 2x All X-League Area Team member (2019, 2020) |
