= Meijiyasuda PentaOcean Pirates =

American football team in Japan

Penta Ocean Pirates

General information
- Founded: 2005
- Headquartered: Hachioji, Tokyo, Japan
- Colors: Navy and White
- Website: https://www.gopiratesnation.com/

Personnel
- General manager: Masashi Yoshikawa
- Head coach: Keisuke Shimoji

League / conference affiliations
- X-League; X1 Area Central Division

The Penta Ocean Pirates are an American football team located in Hachioji, Tokyo, Japan. They are a member of the X-League.

== Team history ==
- 2005 Team Founded as the Yasuda L.A. Pirates. Finished 4th in the East division (2 wins, 3 losses).
- 2006 Team renamed as the Meiji Yasuda Pirates. Finished 5th in the East division (1 win, 4 losses).
- 2007 Finished 4th in the Central division (2 wins, 5 losses).
- 2015 David Powroznilk hired as head coach. Team renamed the Meiji Yasuda Penta-Ocean Pirates. Finished 5th in the East division (1 win, 5 losses, 1 tie).
- 2020 Team renamed the Penta-Ocean Pirates.

== Seasons ==
X-League champions (1987–present)	Division champions	Final Stage/Semifinals Berth	Wild Card /First Stage Berth

Season	Division	Regular Season				Postseason results	Awards	Head coaches
Season	Division	Finish	Wins	Losses	Ties	Postseason results	Awards	Head coaches
2005	East	4th	2	3	0			Hidari Takigaku
2006	East	5th	1	5	0			Shinji Izumi
2007	Central	4th	2	5	0			Shinji Izumi
2008	East	4th	2	6	0			Koji Miyamoto
2009	Central	4th	3	4	0	Won 2nd stage relegation match (Tokyo Gas) 32-13; Won 2nd stage relegation match (Fuji Xerox) 22-13		Koji Miyamoto
2010	Central	3rd	5	3	0	Lost 2nd stage match (Kashima) 13-52; Lost 2nd stage match (Asahi Soft Drinks) 24-29		Koji Miyamoto
2011	East	4th	3	4	0	Lost 2nd stage relegation match (Nihon Unisys) 6-33; Lost 2nd stage relegation match (IBM) 8-38		Koji Miyamoto
2012	East	4th	1	6	0	Won 2nd stage relegation match (Fuji Xerox) 72-7; Lost 2nd stage relegation match (Tokyo Gas) 42-63		Koji Miyamoto
2013	Central	5th	2	5	0	Won 2nd stage relegation match (Hurricanes) 24-17; Won 2nd stage match (Nihon Unisys) 28-15		Terushige Matsuoka
2014	East	5th	1	7	0	Won 2nd stage relegation match (Sun Building Mgmt.) 68-14; Won 2nd stage relegation match (Bulls Football Club) 44-39		Terushige Matsuoka
2015	East	5th	1	5	1	Won 2nd stage relegation match (Hurricanes) 27-9; Lost 2nd stage relegation match (Tokyo Gas) 14-21		David Powroznilk
2016	Central	5th	4	5	0			David Powroznilk
2017	Central	5th	4	5	0			David Powroznilk
2018	East	5th	3	6	0			David Powroznilk
2019	X1 Area Central	2nd	4	5	0			Fumito Kawahata
2020	X1 Area Central		0	0	0	Did not field team due to COVID-19 pandemic.		Fumito Kawahata
2021	X1 Area East	3rd	3	3	0			Fumito Kawahata
2022	X1 Area	2nd	5	1	1	Lost X1 Area/Super exchange match (at Otonori Fukuoka) 9-14		Fumito Kawahata
2023	X1 Area	4th	4	5	0			Fumito Kawahata
2024	X1 Area Central	2nd	5	4	0			Fumito Kawahata
2025	X1 Area Central	2nd	5	3	0			Keisuke Shimoji
Total			57	87	2	(2005–2025, includes only regular season)		
Total			8	7	0	(2005–2025, includes only playoffs)		
Total			65	94	2	(2005–2025, includes both regular season and playoffs)		

== Head coaches ==
Coach	Years	Record
Hidari Takigaku	2005	2-3 (.400)
Shinji Izumi	2006-2007	3-10 (.231)
Koji Miyamoto	2008-2012	16-27 (.372)
Terushige Matsuoka	2013-2014	8-13 (.381)
David Powroznilk	2015-18	13-22-1 (.371)
Fumito Kawahata	2019–24	21-19-1 (.524)
Keisuke Shimoji	2025-present	5-3 (.625)
