= X-League (Japan) =

Japanese league of American football

X-League (Xリーグ)
- Formerly: Japan American Football League (1971–1997)
- Sport: Gridiron football
- Founded: 1971; 55 years ago
- CEO: Riichiro Fukabori
- No. of teams: 51 (Premier:11, X1:12, X2:21, X3:7)
- Country: Japan
- Most recent champion: Panasonic Impulse (5th title) (2025 X1 Super)
- Most titles: Obic Seagulls (9 titles)
- Website: Official website

The X-League (Xリーグ) is the top-level professional gridiron football league in Japan. It was founded in 1971 as the Japan American Football League and organized the first X Bowl in 1987. The league changed its name to the X League in 1997. The league is divided into four divisions (Premier, X1, X2, and X3) with promotion and relegation between them outside of the Premier. Teams are split into different divisions or blocks, depending on the tier. There are two types of teams, one being a company team in which only employees of that particular sponsoring company may play, and the other being a club team for which anyone can try out.

Game rules are based on those of the NCAA college division in the United States, with the exception of the length of quarters, which are 12 minutes instead of 15 during the first stage of the season, and no overtime in the regular season.

The Japanese national team, which has won the first and second editions of the American Football World Cup and was runner-up, finishing second to the American team, in the 2007 installment of the tournament, was made up almost entirely of players from this league.

Americans are often recruited to play for X League teams, with a strict rule of three per team. No more than two foreign players per team are allowed on the field of play at a time.

== Season format ==
The league is split into four tiers: Premier, X1, X2 and X3.

There are two spring tournaments as well which are used by teams to ready themselves and evaluate new players before the fall season. One is the larger Pearl Bowl which teams from eastern Japan compete in, and the other is the Green Bowl for teams in western Japan. Since the reorganization of the X1, XLeague Premier teams no longer compete in the spring tournaments.

=== Regular season ===
The top tier, XLeague Premier, includes eleven teams who play a ten game, eleven week regular season. The season is played in two splits, a four-week spring section, and a six-week fall section.

The second tier, X1, contains twelve teams while X2 comprises nineteen teams, and X3 with sixteen teams. The teams in X1 are divided into three groups with each team playing six games, three inside the group and three outside.

The top tier Premier is played on a single table. The next league down, X1, has teams split into western, central, and eastern groups. The next two leagues below, the X2 and X3, contain east, west, and central divisions. The east and central divisions comprise teams mostly in and around the Kanto area, with the west teams being in the Kansai area.

=== Postseason ===
At the end of the Premier season, the top six teams in the overall rankings head into the playoffs. Since 2022, the winners of the semifinals would advance to the Rice Bowl.

The top two teams in the X1 Area compete in the X1 Area Bowl for the chance to advance to the Area/Super promotional matches against the 7th and 8th place X1 Super teams.

=== Japan X Bowl ===
The two semifinal winners would meet for the league championship in the Japan X Bowl held at the Tokyo Dome. Between 1987 and 2021, the Japan X Bowl has decided the X League championship. Until 2002, it was known as the Tokyo Super Bowl. The winner of this game went on to the Rice Bowl to face the winner of the Koshien Bowl, the national college championship game.

=== Relegation and Division Replacement games ===
Since 2026, the Premier is played as a closed licensed league with no promotion or relegation.

The bottom team in X1 plays the X2 champion to decide who would be the twelfth team in X1 .

== 2026 X-League team organization ==
=== XLeague Premier ===
Team	City/Area	Company/Club	First season	Head coach
Obic Seagulls	Narashino, Chiba	Club team, formerly Recruit	1983	Hiroshi Ono
Tokyo Gas Creators	Koto, Tokyo	Tokyo Gas	1985	Masato Itai
IBM Big Blue	Chiba, Chiba	IBM	1976	Mike Phair
All Mitsubishi Lions	Hachiōji, Tokyo	Mitsubishi UFJ Financial Group	2001	Akira Hayashi
Fujitsu Frontiers	Kawasaki, Kanagawa	Fujitsu	1985	Hiroshi Yamamoto
Nojima Sagamihara Rise	Sagamihara, Kanagawa	Club team, formerly Onward Kashiyama	2009	Shirogataki Ichiro
Oriental Bio Silver Star	Kawasaki, Kanagawa	Club team	1970	Hayato Arima
Fujifilm Ebina Minerva AFC	Ebina, Kanagawa	Fujifilm Business Innovation	1975	Takao Asakura
Panasonic Impulse	Kadoma, Osaka	Panasonic	1974	Nobuyoshi Araki
Sekisui Challengers	Amagasaki, Hyogo	Sekisui Chemical	1978	Takashi Masashige
Elecom Kobe Finies	Kobe, Hyogo	Elecom	1975	Masaki Tokimoto

=== X1 ===
Club	City/Area	Company/Club	First season	Head coach
EAST
Dentsu Caterpillars	Adachi-ku, Tokyo	Club team	1977	Takumi Fukagawa
Shinagawa CC Bullseyes	Shinagawa, Tokyo	Club team	1993	Takuya Yagi
Keishichou Eagles	Chiyoda, Tokyo	Tokyo Metropolitan Police Department	1977	Kosuke Sato
Blue Thunders	Ichikawa, Chiba	Club team	1986	Nobuhiro Hagiwara
CENTRAL
Tainai Deers	Chōfu, Tokyo	Club team formerly Kajima	1989	Yasushi Nakagawa
PentaOcean Pirates	Hachiōji, Tokyo	Club team	2005	Fumito Kawahata
Mitsubishi Club Triax	Toshima-ku, Tokyo	Club team	2000	Song Qinghua
BULLS Football Club	Asaka, Saitama	Club team	1981	
WEST
AsOne Black Eagles	Osaka, Osaka	AS ONE Corp.	1970	Yusuke Kano
Nagoya Cyclones	Nagoya, Aichi	Club team	1980	Masaki Kobayashi
TRIAXIS J-Stars	Osaka	Club team	1985	
Hakata Next Fukuoka Suns	Hakata-ku, Fukuoka	Marketing Applications. Inc	2017	

=== X2 ===
==== East/Central ====
- ILEX Gorillas
- Hurricanes
- Club Barbarian
- Club Seagulls
- Wranglers
- Yokohama Harbors
- Sony Solidstate
- Ibaraki Saviors
- Yokohama Bay Cranes
- Ox Kawasaki AFC
- Zero Fighters AFC
- Shonan B-Style Warriors

==== West ====
- Golden Fighters
- Hiroshima Hawks
- Shoei Blazers
- Isono Superstars
- Club Bears
- Nishinomiya Bruins
- Sidewinders
- Osaka Gas Skunks
- Aichi Golden Wings
- Ryukyu Guardian Lions

=== X3 ===
==== East ====
- MERU-KYOEI Guardians
- Club Steelers

==== West ====
- Okayama Standing Bears
- Tristars
- Club Islands
- Mie Firebird
- Osaka Prefectural Police Shields

== Past results ==
=== X-League divisional standings since 1997 ===
Notations
Advanced to Final6, Super9 or Post Season	Promoted from X2	Demoted to X2 at the end of the season.	Team Folded at the end of the season.

East/Central

Year	Division	1st	2nd	3rd	4th	5th	6th
1997	East	Asahi Beer Silver Star	Onward Oaks	Bank of Tokyo-Mitsubishi Apricot	Fujitsu Frontiers	Tokai Bank Red Wave	Renown Rovers
1997	Central	Kajima Deers	Nissan Prince Tokyo	Recruit Seagulls	Skylark Co., Ltd. Skylarks	Sanwa Bank Lark Hills	Sakura Bank Dainosu
1998	East	Nissan Prince Tokyo	Asahi Beer Silver Star	Skylark Co., Ltd. Skylarks	Tokai Bank Red Wave	Sumitomo Bank Springs	Bank of Tokyo-Mitsubishi Apricot
1998	Central	Kajima Deers	Recruit Seagulls	Onward Oaks	Fujitsu Frontiers	Renown Rovers	Sanwa Bank Lark Hills
1999	East	Onward Oaks	Recruit Seagulls	Nissan Prince Tokyo	Tokyo Marine Dolphins	Tokyo-Mitsubishi Bank Apricot	Sankura Bank Dainosu
1999	Central	Kajima Deers	Asahi Beer Silver Star	Fujitsu Frontiers	Skylark Co., Ltd. Skylarks	Tokyo Marine Dolphins	Sanwa Bank Lark Hills
2000	East	Fujitsu Frontiers	Asahi Beer Silver Star	Onward Oaks	Skylark Co., Ltd. Skylarks	Club Dainosu	Renown Rovers
2000	Central	Recruit Seagulls	Nissan Prince Tokyo	Kajima Deers	Tokyo-Mitsubishi Bank	Tokyo Marine Dolphins	Tokyo Skyliners
2001	East	Kajima Deers	Fujitsu Frontiers	Nissan Prince Tokyo	Gakusei-Engokai Rocbull	Club Dainosu	Club Huskies
2001	Central	Recruit Seagulls	Asahi Beer Silver Star	Onward Oaks	Lions	Renown Rovers	Penta-Ocean Construction Co. Pirates
2002	East	Fujitsu Frontiers	Kajima Deers	Lions	Nissan Skyliners	IBM Big Blue	Sakura Bank Dainosu
2002	Central	Seagulls	Onward Skylarks	Asahi Beer Silver Star	Gakusei-Engokai Rocbull	Renown Rovers	Club Huskies
2003	East	Onward Skylarks	Asahi Beer Silver Star	Fujitsu Frontiers	Nissan Skyliners	Tokyo Gas Creators	Club Huskies
2003	Central	Kajima Deers	Obic Seagulls	Penta-Ocean Construction Co. Pirates	All Mitsubishi Lions	Gakusei-Engokai Rocbull	IBM Big Blue
2004	East	Kajima Deers	Asahi Beer Silver Star	All Mitsubishi Lions	IBM Big Blue	Gakusei-Engokai Rocbull	Penta-Ocean Construction Pirates
2004	Central	Onward Skylarks	Obic Seagulls	Nissan Skyliners	Fujitsu Frontiers	Tokyo Gas Creators	Club Huskies
2005	East	Obic Seagulls	Onward Skylarks	Fujitsu Frontiers	Yasuda L.A. Pirates	Tokyo Gas Creators	All Mitsubishi Lions
2005	Central	Kajima Deers	Asahi Beer Silver Star	IBM Big Blue	Nissan Skyliners	Gakusei-Engokai Rocbull	Renesas Hurricanes
2006	East	Onward Skylarks	Kajima Deers	IBM Big Blue	All Mitsubishi Lions	Meiji Yasuda Pirates	Gakusei-Engokai Rocbull
2006	Central	Asahi Beer Silver Star	Obic Seagulls	Fujitsu Frontiers	Nissan Skyliners	Tokyo Gas Creators	Renesas Hurricanes
2007	East	Fujitsu Frontiers	Obic Seagulls	Asahi Beer Silver Star	All Mitsubishi Lions	Renesas Hurricanes	Gakusei-Engokai Rocbull
2007	Central	Kajima Deers	Onward Skylarks	IBM Big Blue	Meiji Yasuda Pirates	Tokyo Gas Creators	Fuji Xerox Minerva
2008	East	Onward Skylarks	Fujitsu Frontiers	Asahi Beer Silver Star	Meiji Yasuda Pirates	Renesas Hurricanes	Fuji Xerox Minerva
2008	Central	Kajima Deers	Obic Seagulls	IBM Big Blue	All Mitsubishi Lions	All Tokyo Gas Creators	Gakusei-Engokai Rocbull
2009	East	Asahi Beer Silver Star	Obic Seagulls	Nihon Unisys Bulls	All Mitsubishi Lions	Fuji Xerox Minerva	All Tokyo Gas Creators
2009	Central	Fujitsu Frontiers	Kajima Deers	IBM Big Blue	Meiji Yasuda Pirates	Hurricanes AFC	Bullseyes Tokyo
2010	East	Kajima Deers	IBM Big Blue	Asahi Beer Silver Star	All Mitsubishi Lions	Bullseyes Tokyo	Fuji Xerox Minerva
2010	Central	Obic Seagulls	Fujitsu Frontiers	Meiji Yasuda Pirates	All Tokyo Gas Creators	Hurricanes AFC	Nihon Unisys Bulls
2011	East	Kajima Deers	Fujitsu Frontiers	All Mitsubishi Lions	Meiji Yasuda Pirates	Bullseyes Tokyo	Fuji Xerox Minverva
2011	Central	Obic Seagulls	Nojima Sagamihara Rise	Asahi Beer Silver Star	IBM Big Blue	All Tokyo Gas Creators	Nihon Unisys Bulls
2012	East	Kajima Deers	Nojima Sagamihara Rise	Asahi Beer Silver Star	Meiji Yasuda Pirates	Nihon Unisys Bulls	Bullseyes Tokyo
2012	Central	Obic Seagulls	Fujitsu Frontiers	IBM Big Blue	Tokyo Gas Creators	All Mitsubishi Lions	Fuji Xerox Minerva
2013	East	Fujitsu Frontiers	Kajima Deers	Asahi Beer Silver Star	Tokyo Gas Creators	Nihon Unisys Bulls	Hurricanes
2013	Central	Obic Seagulls	Nojima Sagamihara Rise	IBM Big Blue	All Mitsubishi Lions	Meiji Yasuda Pirates	Tokyo MPD Eagles
2014	East	Fujitsu Frontiers	IBM Big Blue	Nojima Sagamihara Rise	Tokyo Gas Creators	Meiji Yasuda Pirates	Hurricanes
2014	Central	LIXIL Deers	Obic Seagulls	Asahi Beer Silver Star	All Mitsubishi Lions	Bulls Football Club	Taiyo Building Mgmt. Cranes
2015	East	Fujitsu Frontiers	Nojima Sagamihara Rise	Obic Seagulls	All Mitsubishi Lions	Meiji Yasuda Penta-Ocean Pirates	Tokyo MPD Eagles
2015	Central	IBM Big Blue	LIXIL Deers	Asahi Beer Silver Star	Bulls Football Club	Tokyo Gas Creators	Hurricanes
2016	East	Fujitsu Frontiers	IBM Big Blue	Asahi Beer Silver Star	All Mitsubishi Lions	Tokyo MPD Eagles	Bulls Football Club
2016	Central	Obic Seagulls	LIXIL Deers	Nojima Sagamihara Rise	Tokyo Gas Creators	Meiji Yasuda Penta-Ocean Pirates	Bullseyes Tokyo
2017	East	Fujitsu Frontiers	LIXIL Deers	Asahi Beer Silver Star	Fuji Xerox Minerva AFC	Tokyo Gas Creators	Tokyo MPD Eagles
2017	Central	Nojima Sagamihara Rise	IBM Big Blue	Obic Seagulls	All Mitsubishi Lions	Meiji Yasuda Penta-Ocean Pirates	Bulls Football Club
2018	East	Fujitsu Frontiers	IBM Big Blue	Asahi Beer Silver Star	All Mitsubishi Lions	Meiji Yasuda Penta-Ocean Pirates	Dentsu Club Caterpillars
2018	Central	Nojima Sagamihara Rise	Obic Seagulls	LIXIL Deers	Tokyo Gas Creators	Fuji Xerox Minerva AFC	Bulls Football Club

West

Year	Division	1st	2nd	3rd	4th	5th	6th
1997	West	Matsushita Electric Works Impulse	Sunstar Finies	MYCAL Bears	Osaka Black Eagles	Iwatani Sidewinders	Asahi Soft Drinks Challengers
1998	West	Asahi Soft Drinks Challengers	Matsushita Electric Works Impulse	MYCAL Bears	Iwatani Sidewinders	Sunstar Finies	Iuchi Black Eagles
1999	West	Asahi Soft Drinks Challengers	MYCAL Bears	Matsushita Electric Works Impulse	Kohaku Finies	Iuchi Black Eagles	Iwatani Sidewinders
2000	West	Matsushita Electric Works Impulse	Asahi Soft Drinks Challengers	MYCAL Bears	Kohaku Finies	Iuchi Black Eagles	Iwatani Sidewinders
2001	West	Matsushita Electric Works Impulse	Asahi Soft Drinks Challengers	MYCAL Bears	Iwatani Sidewinders	Kohaku Finies	AS ONE Black Eagles
2002	West	Matsushita Denko Impulse	Asahi Soft Drinks Challengers	AS ONE Black Eagles	Iwatani Sidewinders	Hankyu Bruins	Kohaku Finies
2003	West	Matsushita Denko Impulse	Asahi Soft Drinks Challengers	AS ONE Black Eagles	Naigai Denki Marvies	Hankyu Bruins	Iwatani Sidewinders
2004	West	Matsushita Denko Impulse	Asahi Soft Drinks Challengers	AS ONE Black Eagles	Naigai Denki Marvies	Finies Football Club	Hankyu Bruins
2005	West	Matsushita Denko Impulse	Asahi Soft Drinks Challengers	Naigai Denki Marvies	AS ONE Black Eagles	Iwatani Sidewinders	Kobe Finies
2006	West	Matsushita Denko Impulse	Nagai Denki Marvies	Asahi Soft Drinks Challengers	SRC Kobe Finies	AS ONE Black Eagles	Iwatani Sidewinders
2007	West	Matsushita Denko Impulse	Asahi Soft Drinks Challengers	Naigai Denki Marvies	AS ONE Black Eagles	SRC Kobe Finies	Nagoya Cyclones
2008	West	Asahi Soft Drinks Challengers	Panasonic Denko Impulse	SRC Kobe Finies	Naigai Denki Marvies	Asahi Pretec Golden Fighters	AS ONE Black Eagles
2009	West	Panasonic Denko Impulse	Asahi Soft Drinks Challengers	Suita Marvies	Elecom Kobe Finies	Asahi Pretec Golden Fighters	AS ONE Black Eagles
2010	West	Panasonic Denko Impulse	Asahi Soft Drinks Challengers	Suita Marvies	Elecom Kobe Finies	AS ONE Black Eagles	Nagoya Cyclones
2011	West	Panasonic Impulse	Asahi Soft Drinks Challengers	AS ONE Black Eagles	Elecom Kobe Finies	Nagoya Cyclones	Fuji Xerox J-Stars
2012	West	Panasonic Impulse	Asahi Soft Drinks Challengers	AS ONE Black Eagles	Elecom Kobe Finies	Nagoya Cyclones	Nishinomiya Bruins
2013	West	Panasonic Impulse	Asahi Soft Drinks Challengers	AS ONE Black Eagles	Elecom Kobe Finies	Nishinomiya Bruins	Nagoya Cyclones
2014	West	Elecom Kobe Finies	Panasonic Impulse	Asahi Soft Drinks Challengers	AS ONE Black Eagles	Nagoya Cyclones	Nishinomiya Bruins
2015	West	Panasonic Impulse	Asahi Soft Drinks Challengers	Elecom Kobe Finies	AS ONE Black Eagles	Nagoya Cyclones	Fuji Xerox J-Stars
2016	West	Panasonic Impulse	Elecom Kobe Finies	Asahi Soft Drinks Challengers	AS ONE Black Eagles	Nagoya Cyclones	Sidewinders
2017	West	Panasonic Impulse	Elecom Kobe Finies	Asahi Soft Drinks Challengers	AS ONE Black Eagles	Nagoya Cyclones	Club Hawkeye
2018	West	Panasonic Impulse	Elecom Kobe Finies	Asahi Soft Drinks Challengers	AS ONE Black Eagles	Nagoya Cyclones	Sidewinders

- Until 2008, the top 2 teams in each division qualified for the playoffs to the Japan X bowl known as the Final6. Starting 2009, the top 3 teams in each division qualified for the Super9 in the 2nd stage.

Notations
Advanced to Semifinals	Promoted from X1 Area	Demoted to X1 Area at the end of the season.	Team Folded at the end of the season.

X1 Super

Year	1st	2nd	3rd	4th	5th	6th	7th	8th
2019	Fujitsu Frontiers	Obic Seagulls	Panasonic Impulse	Elecom Kobe Finies	IBM Big Blue	Tokyo Gas Creators	All Mitsubishi Lions	Nojima Sagamihara Rise
2021	Panasonic Impulse	Fujitsu Frontiers	Obic Seagulls	IBM Big Blue	Nojima Sagamihara Rise	Tokyo Gas Creators	Elecom Kobe Finies	All Mitsubishi Lions
2022								

Notations
Advanced to Post Season	Promoted from X2	Demoted to X2 at the end of the season.	Team Folded at the end of the season.

X1 Area East/Central

Year	Division	1st	2nd	3rd	4th
2019	East	Asahi Beer Silver Star	Fuji Xerox Minerva AFC	Dentsu Club Caterpillars	AFC Cranes
2019	Central	LIXIL Deers	Meiji Yasuda PentaOcean Pirates	Tokyo MPD Eagles	Bullseyes Tokyo
2021	East	Asahi Beer Silver Star	Tokyo MPD Eagles	PentaOcean Pirates	Fuji Xerox Minerva AFC
2021	Central	Deers Football Club	Dentsu Club Caterpillars	Bullseyes Tokyo	Bulls Football Club

X1 Area West

Year	Division	1st	2nd	3rd	4th
2019	West	Asahi Soft Drinks Challengers	Fukuoka Opatsu Suns	Nagoya Cyclones	AS ONE Black Eagles
2021	West	Asahi Soft Drinks Challengers	Equal One Fukuoka Suns	AS ONE Black Eagles	Nagoya Cyclones

== Playing venues ==
Stadium	Location	Capacity
East/Central Division
Kawasaki Stadium	Kawasaki, Kanagawa	2,700
Yokohama Stadium	Yokohama, Kanagawa	20,000
Sagamihara Asamizo Park Stadium	Minami-ku, Sagamihara	11,808
Amino Vital Field	Chōfu, Tokyo	3,000
Akitsu Soccer Stadium	Narashino, Chiba	2,100
Tokyo Dome	Bunkyo, Tokyo	55,000
Oi Futo Central Seaside Park Field	Shinagawa-ku, Tokyo	5,000
Chiba Marine Stadium	Chiba City, Chiba	30,082
Yurtec Stadium Sendai	Sendai, Miyagi	19,694
Todoroki Athletics Stadium	Kawasaki, Kanagawa	26,232
Sendai City Athletic Stadium	Sendai, Miyagi	7,000
West Division
Expo Flash Field	Suita, Osaka	3,000
Kobe Prince Stadium	Nada-ku, Kobe	3,000
Nagai Stadium	Higashisumiyoshi-ku, Osaka	47,816
Kincho Stadium	Higashisumiyoshi-ku, Osaka	20,500
Minato Soccer Stadium	Nagoya, Aichi	20,000
Tsurumi Ryokuchi Field	Tsurumi-ku, Osaka	3,710
Osaka Nagai Second Stadium	Higashisumiyoshi-ku, Osaka	15,000
Handa Athletics Stadium	Handa, Aichi	9,074
Amagasaki Memorial Park Stadium	Amagasaki, Hyogo	10,000
Suzuka Sports Garden	Suzuka, Mie	3,300
Toyota Athletic Stadium	Toyota, Aichi	5,500

== Awards and honors ==
=== All X-League Team ===
Since 2000, the X-League honors outstanding players by electing them to the All X-League Team. 11 offensive players, 11 defensive players and 3 special team players are voted by the Head Coaches and 5 players on each of the 18 X1 teams to be selected for the team. Starting 2019, the All X-League team was divided between 2 classifications: The 8-team X1 Super and 12-team X1 Area with both selecting 11 offensive players, 11 defensive players and 3 special team players and are voted by the Head Coaches and 5 players on each of the teams. In 2020, the X1 Area All X League Team was expanded to include a West and East team due to the shortened season caused by the COVID-19 pandemic.

=== X-League Most Valuable Player (MVP) award ===
The X-League Most Valuable Player award (X-League MVP) is an award given to the Japanese Gridiron football player who is considered most valuable to his team in the X-League. Started in 2012, the award was divided between the best player in each division until 2014 when one overall MVP was awarded. Starting in 2019, the award was divided between the best player in each classification.

Year	Division	Winner	Position	Team
2012	East	Yasuhiro Maruta	Running back	Kajima Deers
2012	Central	Noriaki Kinoshita	Wide receiver	Obic Seagulls
2012	West	Ryohei Imanishi	Cornerback	Panasonic Impulse
2013	East	Keiya Hiramoto	Quarterback	Fujitsu Frontiers
2013	Central	Noriaki Kinoshita	Wide receiver	Obic Seagulls
2013	West	Tetsuo Takata	Quarterback	Panasonic Impulse

Year	Winner	Position	Team
2014	Gino Gordon	Running back	Fujitsu Frontiers
2015	Tetsuo Takata	Quarterback	Panasonic Impulse
2016	Colby Cameron	Quarterback	Fujitsu
2017	Benjamin Anderson	Quarterback	Panasonic Impulse
2018	Trashaun Nixon	Running back	Fujitsu Frontiers

Year	Classification	Winner	Position	Team
2019	X1 Super	Samajie Grant	Running back	Fujitsu Frontiers
2019	X1 Area	Garret Safron	Quarterback	Asahi Soft Drinks Challengers
2021	X1 Super	Jaboree Williams	Linebacker	Panasonic Impulse
2021	X1 Area	Hiroshi Kawamura	Running back	Asahi Beer Silver Star
2022	X1 Super	Trashaun Nixon	Running Back	Fujitsu Frontiers
2022	X1 Area	Aaron Ellis	Quarterback	Dentsu Club Caterpillars
2023	X1 Super	Trashaun Nixon	Running Back	Fujitsu Frontiers
2023	X1 Area	John Gibbs	Quarterback	All Mitsubishi Lions
2024	X1 Super	Samajie Grant	Wide Receiver	Fujitsu Frontiers
2024	X1 Area	Aaron Ellis	Quarterback	Dentsu Club Caterpillars
2025	X1 Super	Boogie Knight	Wide Receiver	Sekisui Challengers
2025	X1 Area	Kosei Okuno	Quarterback	Dentsu Club Caterpillars

=== X-League Rookie of the Year (ROY) award ===
The X-League Rookie of the Year award (X-League ROY) is an award given to the player who is considered have made a big impact during his first year with his team. Started in 2012, the award was divided between the best player in each division until 2014 when one overall ROY was awarded. Starting in 2019, the awarded was divided between 2 classifications: X1 Super and X1 Area.

Year	Division	Winner	Position	Team
2012	East	Kohei Arai	Center	Kajima Deers
2012	Central	Kevin Craft	Quarterback	IBM Big Blue
2012	West	Hisashi Kurokawa	Offensive tackle	Panasonic Impulse
2013	East	Junpei Yoshimoto	Wide receiver	Fujitsu Frontiers
2013	Central	Kealakai Maiava	Offensive tackle	Obic Seagulls
2013	West	David Motu	Linebacker	Panasonic Impulse

Year	Winner	Position	Team
2014	Colby Cameron	Quarterback	Fujitsu Frontiers
2015	Mason Mills	Quarterback	Asahi Beer Silver Star
2016	Devin Gardner	Quarterback	Nojima Sagamihara Rise
2017	Taku Li	Running back	Obic Seagulls
2018	Michael Birdsong	Quarterback	Fujitsu Frontiers

Year	Classification	Winner	Position	Team
2019	X1 Super	Samajie Grant	Running back	Fujitsu Frontiers
2019	X1 Area	Garrett Safron	Quarterback	Asahi Soft Drinks Challengers
2021	X1 Super	Jerod Evans	Quarterback	Tokyo Gas Creators
2021	X1 Area	Satoshi Konuki	Wide receiver	Dentsu Caterpillars
2022	X1 Super	Jaylon Henderson	Quarterback	Panasonic Impulse
2022	X1 Area	Kento Shibata	Running Back	PentaOcean Pirates
2023	X1 Super	Boogie Knight	Wide Receiver	Asahi Soft Drinks Challengers
2023	X1 Area	Ryushi Ando	Linebacker	FujiXerox Minerva AFC
2024	X1 Super	Tay Cunningham	Wide Receiver	Nojima Sagamihara Rise
2024	X1 Area	Yuito Ikeda	Running Back	Shinagawa CC Bullseyes
2025	X1 Super	Pierce Holley	Quarterback	Obic Seagulls
2025	X1 Area	Paul Morant	Defensive Back	Tainai Deers

=== X-League Fairplay award ===
Since 2012, the X-League Fairplay award is awarded to the team that had accumulated the fewest penalties during the regular season.

Year	Division	Team
2012	West	Panasonic Impulse
2013	Central	All Mitsubishi Lions
2014	East	Hurricanes (X-League)
2015	Central	Hurricanes (X-League)
2016	East	Keishichou Eagles
2017	East	Keishichou Eagles

== Team names ==
- Silver Star → Asahi Beer Silver Star
- Matsushita Electric Works Impulse → Panasonic Electric Works Impulse
- Kohoku Finies → Sunstar Finies → Kohoku Finies → Finies Football Club → Kobe Finies → SRC Kobe Finies → Elecom Kobe Finies
- Recruit Seagulls → Seagulls → Obic Seagulls
- NEC Falcons (dissolved in 1997)
- Renown Rovers (dissolved in 2003)
- Onward Oaks → Onward Skylarks(Combined with Skylark Skylarks in 2001) → Onward Oaks (dissolved in 2009)→ Sagamihara Rise (Remnants of the Onward Oaks formed a new team called the Sagamihara Rise (same uniforms and colors, although different logo) and played one level down in the X2 league through the 2010 season. They subsequently won the challenge game against the Renesas Hurricanes to move back up to X1 in December 2010, and will play again in the X1 Central Division for the 2011 season, with the Hurricanes moving down to X2)
