= Tokyo Gas Creators =

American football team

General information
- Founded: 1985
- Headquartered: Koto, Tokyo
- Colors: Blue, Red and White
- Website: https://tokyogas-creators.com/

Personnel
- General manager: Akihiko Matsuda
- Head coach: Masato Itai

League / conference affiliations
- X-League; X1 Super Division

The Tokyo Gas Creators are an American football team located in Koto, Tokyo, Japan. They are a member of the X-League.

== Team history ==
- 1985 Team founded
- 1989 Joined the X-League X3
- 1990 Promoted from X3 to X2
- 1991 Promoted from X2 to X1
- 1992 Placed 6th in the East Division. Demoted from X2 to X1 at the end of the season.
- 1994 Placed 1st in the X2 East division. Promoted from X2 to X1 for the following season.
- 2008 Team name changed to All Tokyo Gas Creators. Placed 5th in the Central division (1 win, 4 losses).
- 2009 Placed 6th in the East Division (1 win, 6 losses).
- 2010 Placed 4th in the Central division (3 wins, 4 losses).
- 2011 Placed 5th in the Central division (3 wins, 4 losses).
- 2012 Team name changed to Tokyo Gas Creators. Placed 4th in the Central division (4 wins, 3 losses).
- 2013 Kurt Rose hired as head coach. Placed 5th in the East division (3 wins, 4 losses).
- 2014 Placed 5th in the East division (3 wins, 4 losses).

== Seasons ==
X-League champions (1987–present)	Division champions	Final Stage/Semifinals Berth	Wild Card /2nd Stage Berth

Season	Division	Regular Season				Postseason results	Awards	Head coaches
Season	Division	Finish	Wins	Losses	Ties	Postseason results	Awards	Head coaches
2004	Central	5th	1	4	0			
2005	East	5th	1	4	0			
2006	Central	5th	1	4	0			
2007	Central	5th	1	6	0			
2008	Central	5th	2	6	0			
2009	East	6th	1	6	0	Lost 2nd relegation match (Meiji Yasuda) 13-32; Won 2nd stage relegation match (Hurricanes) 24-6; Won X1-X2 replacement game (Tokyo MPD) 38-0		
2010	Central	5th	2	5	0	Won 2nd stage relegation match (Fuji Xerox) 31-7; Won 2nd stage relegation match (Bullseyes-Tokyo) 31-0		
2011	Central	5th	2	5	0	Won 2nd stage relegation match (Fuji Xerox) 41-28; Won 2nd stage relegation match (Bullseyes-Tokyo) 28-14		
2012	Central	4th	3	4	0	Won 2nd stage relegation match (Bullseyes-Tokyo) 36-14; Won 2nd stage relegation match (Meiji Yasuda) 63-42		
2013	East	4th	3	4	0	Won 2nd stage relegation match (Tokyo MPD) 22-7; Lost 2nd stage relegation match (All Mitsubishi) 7-28		Kurt Rose
2014	East	4th	3	5	0	Won 2nd stage relegation match (Sun Building Mgmt.) 63-15; Lost 2nd stage relegation match (at All Mitsubishi) 17-42		Kurt Rose
2015	Central	5th	1	5	1	Won 2nd stage relegation match (Tokyo MPD) 31-28; Won 2nd stage relegation match (at Meiji Yasuda) 21-14		Kurt Rose
2016	Central	4th	3	5	0	Lost Battle9/Super9 classification match (at Nojima Sagamihara) 7-69		Kurt Rose
2017	East	5th	3	6	0			Masato Itai
2018	Central	4th	7	2	0	Won Wildcard match (at LIXIL) 14-7 OT; Lost Quarterfinals match (at Panasonic) 0-45		Seiji Itaki
2019	X1 Super	6th	4	6	0			Seiji Itaki
2020	X1 Super	7th	0	2	0			Seiji Itaki
2021	X1 Super	6th	2	5	0		Jerod Evans (X1 Super ROY)	Seiji Itaki
2022	X1 Super Div. B	5th	3	5	0			Masato Itai
2023	X1 Super Div. A	4th	2	5	0	Lost Quarterfinals match (at Fujitsu) 3-10		Masato Itai
2024	X1 Super	5th	3	3	2	Lost Quarterfinals match (at Sekisui) 0-21		Masato Itai
2025	X1 Super East	2nd	4	4	0	Won Quarterfinals match (at Sekisui) 16-13; Lost Semifinals match (at Obic) 9-35		Masato Itai
Total			50	96	3	(2004–2025, includes only regular season)		
Total			13	9	0	(2004–2025, includes only playoffs)		
Total			63	105	3	(2004–2025, includes both regular season and playoffs)		

== Current import players ==
Jersey #	Name	Position	Years with the team	Alma mater	Achievements
#28	Justin Hobbs	WR	2024–present	University of Tulsa	
#27	Matt McClellan	DE	2022–present	Missouri State University	2x All X1 Super Team member (2023, 2024)

Former import players

Name	Position	Years with the team	Alma mater	Achievements
Jerod Evans	QB	2021, 2024	Virginia Tech	X1 Super ROY (2021)
Tevaka Tuioti	QB	2023	University of New Mexico	
Kanawai Noa	WR	2022–2023	University of Nebraska-Lincoln	All X1 Super Team member (2023)
Kaulana Apeulu	LB	2022–2023	University of Oregon	All X1 Super Team member (2023)
Reece Foy	QB	2022	Amherst College	
Sean Draper	CB	2021	University of Iowa	3x All X-League Team member (2019, 2020, 2022)
Jebrai Reagan	DE	2019–2021	Gardner-Webb University	All X-League Team member (2021)
Nnamdi Agude	WR	2020–2021	Sacramento State University	All X-League Team member (2021)
Terrence Owens	QB	2020	University of Toledo	
Timothy McGee	DT	2019	University of Memphis	
Andre Whyte	RB/DB	2018–2019	Bryant	
Ikaika Woolsey	QB	2018–2019	Hawai'i	
Richard Ellebie	DT	2017–2018	Westminster (PA)	
Demetrius Eaton	DE	2018	Northwestern	
