= List of Japanese collegiate American football programs =

This is a list of the schools in Japan that have varsity football teams and are overseen by the Japan American Football Association.

There are a total of eight leagues divided between East Japan (東日本) and West Japan (西日本). Each league has at least two tiers of program. The top or first tier is the only one that sends teams to the post season tournament. The remaining teams are in lower tiers that can not compete in the post season, but may play their way into the top tier via promotion and relegation.

== East (東日本) ==
The leagues comprising the East are:

- Kantoh Collegiate American Football Association
- Hokkaido American Football Association
- Tohoku Collegiate American Football Association

Team	Nickname	City	Prefecture	League	First Played
Akita	Ogres	Akita	Akita	Tohoku	
Chuo	Racoons	Hachiōji	Tokyo	Kantoh	1967
Hokkai Gakuen	Golden Bears	Sapporo	Hokkaido	Hokkaido	
Hokkaido	Big Green	Sapporo	Hokkaido	Hokkaido	1974
Hokusei Gakuen	Pirates	Sapporo	Hokkaido	Hokkaido	
Hosei	Tomahawks	Tokyo	Tokyo	Kantoh	
Iwate	Bisons	Morioka	Iwate	Tohoku	1990
Keio	Unicorns	Minato	Tokyo	Kantoh	1935
Kokushikan	Rhinoceros	Setagaya	Tokyo	Kantoh (Big 8)	
Meiji	Griffins	Setagaya	Tokyo	Kantoh	1934
Nihon	Phoenix	Chiyoda	Tokyo	Kantoh	1940
NSSU	Triumphant Lion	Setagaya	Tokyo	Kantoh	1956
Obihiro	Cowboys	Obihiro	Hokkaido	Hokkaido	
Rikkyo	St. Paul's Rushers	Toshima	Tokyo	Kantoh	1934
Sapporo	Cubs	Sapporo	Hokkaido	Hokkaido	
Sapporo Gakuin	Crimson Knights	Ebetsu	Hokkaido	Hokkaido	1978
Sendai	Silver Falcons	Sendai	Miyagi	Tohoku	
Senshu	Green Machine	Chiyoda	Tokyo	Kantoh (Big 8)	
Tohoku	Hornets	Sendai	Miyagi	Tohoku	
Tohoku Gakuin	Kayaks	Sendai	Miyagi	Tohoku	
Waseda	Big Bears	Shinjuku	Tokyo	Kantoh	1934

== West (西日本) ==
The leagues comprising the West are:

- Chushikoku Collegiate American Football Association
- Hokuriku Collegiate American Football League
- Kansai Collegiate American Football League
- Kyūshū Collegiate American Football Association
- Tokai Collegiate American Football Association

Team	Nickname	City	Prefecture	League	First Played
Doshisha	Wild Rovers	Kyoto	Kyoto	Kansai	
Ehime	Bombers	Matsuyama	Ehime	Chushikoku	1976
Fukuoka	Black Knights	Fukuoka	Fukuoka	Kyushu	
Hiroshima	Racoons	Hiroshima	Hiroshima	Chushikoku	1977
Kansai	Kaisers	Suita	Osaka	Kansai	
Kobe	Ravens	Kobe	Hyōgo	Kansai	
Konan	Red Gang	Kobe	Hyōgo	Kansai	
Kurume	Mean Fighters	Kurume	Fukuoka	Kyushu	
Kwansei Gakuin	Fighters	Nishinomiya	Hyōgo	Kansai	
Kyoto	Gangsters	Kyoto	Kyoto	Kansai	
Kyushu	Palookas	Fukuoka	Fukuoka	Kyushu	
Ritsumeikan	Panthers	Kyoto	Kyoto	Kansai	1953
Ryukoku	Seahorse	Kyoto	Kyoto	Kansai	
Ryukyus	Stingrays	Nishihara	Okinawa	Kyushu	
Seinan Gakuin	Green Dolphins	Fukuoka	Fukuoka	Kyushu	1973
Shimane	Warriors	Matsue	Shimane	Chushikoku	1982
UTEF	Lions	Munakata	Fukuoka	Kyushu	
Yamaguchi	Gamblers	Yamaguchi	Yamaguchi	Chushikoku	1980
Kindai	Devils	Higashiōsaka	Osaka	Kansai	
Kōchi	Marine Corps	Kōchi	Kōchi	Chushikoku	1977
Matsuyama	Blue Arrows	Matsuyama	Ehime	Chushikoku	1978
Momoyama Gakuin	Thundering Legion Lions	Izumi	Osaka	Kansai	
Prefectural University of Hiroshima	Knights	Shōbara	Hiroshima	Chushikoku	1989

== See also ==
- List of NCAA Division I FBS football programs
- List of NCAA Division I FCS football programs
- List of NCAA Division II football programs
- List of NCAA Division III football programs
- List of NAIA football programs
- List of junior college football programs in the United States
- List of colleges and universities with club football teams
- List of defunct college football teams
- List of Mexican collegiate American football programs
