= 2016 JAFA Division I football season =

Japanese college football season

2016 JAFA football season
- Regular season: August 2016 – December 2016
- National championship: 2016 Koshien Bowl
- Location of championship: Koshien Stadium; Nishinomiya, Japan
- Champion: TBD

The 2016 Japan college football season, involves all play of college football in Japan organized by the Japan American Football Association (JAFA) at the Division I level. The statistics on that season can be found below.

== Conference standings ==
2016 Chushikoku Collegiate American Football Association Division 1 football standings
	Conf.			Overall
Team	W		L	W		L
Ehime	0	–	0	0	–	0
Hiroshima	0	–	0	0	–	0
Kōchi	0	–	0	0	–	0
Shimane	0	–	0	0	–	0
As of June 23, 2016

2016 Hokkaido American Football Association Division 1 football standings
	Conf.			Overall
Team	W		L	W		L
Hokkaidō	3	–	0	3	–	0
Hokkai Gakuen	2	–	0	2	–	0
Hokusei Gakuen	2	–	1	2	–	1
Obihiro	1	–	2	1	–	2
Sapporo	0	–	2	0	–	2
Sapporo Gakuin	0	–	3	0	–	3
As of October 1, 2016

2016 Hokuriku Collegiate American Football League Division 1 football standings
	Conf.			Overall
Team	W		L	W		L
Fukui	0	–	0	0	–	0
Fukui Prefectural	0	–	0	0	–	0
Kanazawa	0	–	0	0	–	0
KIT	0	–	0	0	–	0
Toyama	0	–	0	0	–	0
As of June 23, 2016

2016 Kansai Collegiate American Football League Division 1 football standings
	Conf.			Overall
Team	W		L	W		L
Ritsumeikan	3	–	0	3	–	0
Kwansei Gakuin	3	–	0	3	–	0
Kansai	3	–	0	3	–	0
Ryukoku	1	–	2	1	–	2
Konan	1	–	2	1	–	2
Kyoto	1	–	2	1	–	2
Doshisha	0	–	3	0	–	3
Kobe	0	–	3	0	–	3
As of October 3, 2016

2016 Kantoh Collegiate American Football Association Division 1 football standings
	Conf.			Overall
Team	W		L	W		L
Top 8
Chuo	0	–	0	0	–	0
Hosei	0	–	0	0	–	0
Keio	0	–	0	0	–	0
Meiji	0	–	0	0	–	0
Nihon	0	–	0	0	–	0
NSSU	0	–	0	0	–	0
Rikkyo	0	–	0	0	–	0
Waseda	0	–	0	0	–	0
Big 8
Kokushikan	0	–	0	0	–	0
Komazawa	0	–	0	0	–	0
Senshu	0	–	0	0	–	0
Takushoku	0	–	0	0	–	0
Teikyo	0	–	0	0	–	0
Tokyo	0	–	0	0	–	0
Tokyo Gakugei	0	–	0	0	–	0
Yokohama National	0	–	0	0	–	0
$ – Conference champion; x – Division champion/co-champions; Rankings from AP Poll

2016 Kyūshū Collegiate American Football Association Division 1 football standings
	Conf.			Overall
Team	W		L	W		L
Fukuoka	0	–	0	0	–	0
Kurume	0	–	0	0	–	0
Kyushu	0	–	0	0	–	0
Ryukyus	0	–	0	0	–	0
Seinan Gakuin	0	–	0	0	–	0
UTEF	0	–	0	0	–	0
As of June 23, 2016

2016 Tohoku Collegiate American Football Association Division 1 football standings
	Conf.			Overall
Team	W		L	W		L
Akita	0	–	0	0	–	0
Iwate	0	–	0	0	–	0
Kitasato	0	–	0	0	–	0
Sendai	0	–	0	0	–	0
Tohoku	0	–	0	0	–	0
Tohoku Gakuin	0	–	0	0	–	0
As of June 23, 2016

2016 Tokai Collegiate American Football Association Division 1 football standings
	Conf.			Overall
Team	W		L	W		L
Meijo	2	–	0	2	–	0
Nagoya	2	–	0	2	–	0
Chukyo	2	–	0	2	–	0
Nanzan	0	–	2	0	–	2
Gifu	0	–	2	0	–	2
Aichi	0	–	2	0	–	2
As of October 3, 2016

== Postseason Bowls ==
Date	Game	Site	Television	Radio	Teams	Affiliations	Results
Dec. 25	Tokyo Bowl	TBD; Tokyo; TBD	TBD	TBD	#2 Kansai League #2 Kantoh League	Kansai; Kantoh	

== Rice Bowl Playoffs ==
Date	Game	Site	Television	Radio	Teams	Affiliations	Results
Dec. 25	Pine Bowl	Sapporo Dome; Sapporo; TBD	TBD	TBD	#1 Hokkaido League #1 Tohoku League	Hokkaido; Tohoku	
