= 2015 Heiwadai Bowl =

- 31st Heiwadai
Seinan Gakuin Green Dolphins	Hiroshima Racoons
KCAFA	CCAFA
17	7
	1	2	3	4	Total
Seinan Gakuin	7	0	3	7	17
Hiroshima	0	7	0	0	7
- Date: November 1, 2015
- Season: 2015
- Stadium: Heiwadai Athletics Stadium

The 2015 Heiwadai Bowl is a college football bowl game that was played on Sunday, November 1, 2015 at Heiwadai Athletics Stadium in Japan. Seinan Gakuin University representing the Kyūshū Collegiate American Football Association and Hiroshima University representing the Chushikoku Collegiate American Football Association. Seinan Gakuin beat Hiroshima by a score of 17-7.
