= Hokkaido American Football Association =

American college football league in Japan

- Founded: April 1, 1975
- Region: Hokkaido, Japan
- Website: hokkaido-afa.com

The Hokkaido American Football Association (北海道アメリカンフットボール協会) or HAFA is an American college football league made up of colleges and universities on the island of Hokkaido, Japan.

== Overview ==
The Hokkaido American Football Association is the highest level of collegiate football in the prefecture of Hokkaido. Eleven universities and colleges compete. The League was founded on April 1, 1975.

== Member schools ==
2025 season alignment.

=== League 1 ===
Institution	日本語	Location	Founded	Type	Enrollment	Nickname	Colors
Hokkai Gakuen University	北海学園大学	Sapporo, Hokkaido	1885	Private		Golden Bears	Black and Gold
Kushiro Public University of Economics	釧路公立大学	Kushiro, Hokkaido	1988	Public		Golden Cranes	Black and White
Hokkaido University	北海道大学	Sapporo, Hokkaido	1876	Public	11,153	Big Green	Green and White
Muroran Institute of Technology	室蘭工業大学	Muroran, Hokkaido	1949	National		Black Panthers	Black and Gold
Tokyo University of Agriculture	東京農業大学	Abashiri, Hokkaido	1891	Private		Fighting Radish	Green and Silver
Obihiro University of Agriculture and Veterinary Medicine	帯広畜産大学	Obihiro, Hokkaido	1941	National	1,300	Cowboys	Green, White, and Gold

=== League 2 ===
Institution	日本語	Location	Founded	Type	Enrollment	Nickname	Colors
Hokkaido University of Science	北海道科学大学	Sapporo, Hokkaido	1967	Private		Wolves	Black and Orange
Hokusei Gakuen University	北星学園大学	Sapporo, Hokkaido	1962	Private	4,337	Pirates	Orange and Blue
Sapporo Gakuin University	札幌学院大学	Ebetsu, Hokkaido	1946	Private		Crimson Knights	Crimson and White

=== Former members ===
Institution	日本語	Location	Founded	Type	Enrollment	Nickname	Colors
Otaru University of Commerce	小樽商科大学	Otaru, Hokkaido	1910	National	2,425	Tomahawks	
Health Sciences University of Hokkaido	北海道医療大学	Tōbetsu, Hokkaido	1974	Private	3,053	First Molars	Navy Blue and White
Sapporo University	札幌大学	Sapporo, Hokkaido	1967	Private		Cubs	Purple and White

Locations of teams for the 2018 season.
League 1 League 2

== Champions ==
=== League 1 champions ===
Season	Team	Record	Postseason results
2009	Otaru	5-0	
2010	Otaru	5-0	Lost 2010 Clash Bowl Semifinals
2011	Otaru	4-1	Lost 2011 Pine Bowl
2012	Sapporo Gakuin	5-0	Lost 2012 Pine Bowl
2013	Hokkaido	5-0	Lost 2013 Pine Bowl
2014	Hokkaido	5-0	Lost 2014 Pine Bowl
2015	Hokkaido	5-0	Lost 2015 Pine Bowl
2016	Hokkaido	5-0	Lost 2016 Pine Bowl
2017	Hokkaido	5-0	Lost 2017 Pine Bowl
2017	Hokkaido	5-0	Lost 2017 Pine Bowl
2018	Hokkai Gakuen	5-0	Lost 2018 Pine Bowl
2024	Hokkaido	5-0	Lost 2023 Pine Bowl

=== League 2 champions ===
Season	Team	Record	Postseason results
2013	Hokkai Gakuen		Lost relegation game vs Obihiro (58-11)
2014	Hokkai Gakuen		Won relegation game vs Muroran Tech (24-13)
2015	HSUH		Lost relegation game vs Hokusei Gakuen (39-7)
2016	Kushiro		Lost relegation game vs Sapporo (47-2)
2017	HSU	4-0	Lost relegation game vs Hokkai Gakuen (74-19)
2018	Muroran		Lost relegation game vs Obihiro (45-0)

== Pine Bowl ==
The champion of the Hokkaidō League plays in the Pine Bowl against the champion of the Tohoku Collegiate American Football Association for the North Japan championship.
