= 2017 HUS Wolves football team =

College football season

2017 HUS Wolves football

Division 2 Champions
- Conference: Hokkaido American Football Association
- Division 2
- Record: 4-0 (4-0 Hokkaido)

2017 Hokkaido American Football Association standings
	Conf.					Overall
Team		W		L			W		L
Division 1
Hokkaido		4	–	0			4	–	0
Sapporo		3	–	1			3	–	1
Obihiro		2	–	2			2	–	2
Sapporo Gakuin		1	–	3			1	–	3
Hokusei Gakuen		1	–	3			1	–	3
Hokkai Gakuen		1	–	3			1	–	3
Division 2
HUS x		4	–	0			4	–	0
Nodai	1	–	1	–	1	1	–	1	–	1
HSUH		1	–	2			1	–	2
Muroran Tech		1	–	2			1	–	2
Kushiro	0	–	2	–	1	0	–	2	–	1
x – Division champion/co-champions; Rankings from AP Poll

The 2017 HUS football team represented the Hokkaido University of Science in the 2017 JAFA Division 2 football season.

== Schedule ==
Date	Time	Opponent	Site	Result
August 27	12:30 pm	Kushiro	Sapporo	W 28–7
September 19	10:00 am	HSUH	Sapporo	W 14–0
September 24	10:00 am	Muroran Tech	Sapporo	W 10–0
October 10	10:00 am	Nodai	Sapporo	W 18–7
All times are in Japan Standard time

== Game summaries ==
=== Kushiro ===
	1	2	3	4	Total
Snipers	0	7	0	0	7
Wolves	0	0	15	13	28

=== HSUH ===
	1	2	3	4	Total
First Molars	0	0	0	0	0
Wolves	0	7	0	7	14

=== Muroran Tech ===
	1	2	3	4	Total
Black Panthers	0	0	0	0	0
Wolves	7	3	0	0	10

=== Nodai ===
	1	2	3	4	Total
Fighting Radish	7	0	0	0	7
Wolves	6	2	0	10	18
