= 2016 college football season =

2016 college football season may refer to:

== American leagues ==
- 2016 NCAA Division I FBS football season
- 2016 NCAA Division I FCS football season
- 2016 NCAA Division II football season
- 2016 NCAA Division III football season
- 2016 NAIA football season

== Non-American leagues ==
- 2016 Japan college football season
- 2016 CIS football season
