= Pine Bowl =

Pine Bowl may refer to:

- Pine Bowl (game), an American football championship game held in Japan
- Pine Bowl, a football stadium in Loretto, Pennsylvania, USA; now replaced by DeGol Field
- Pine Bowl, a football stadium in Whitworth University, Spokane, Washington, USA
- Pine Bowl, a bowling alley in Fultondale, Alabama, USA

== See also ==
- Pine Box Bowl
- King Pine Bowl, Sugarloaf (ski resort), Maine, USA
- Bowl (disambiguation)
- Pine (disambiguation)
