= Fred Jackson (running back) =

American football player (born 1981)

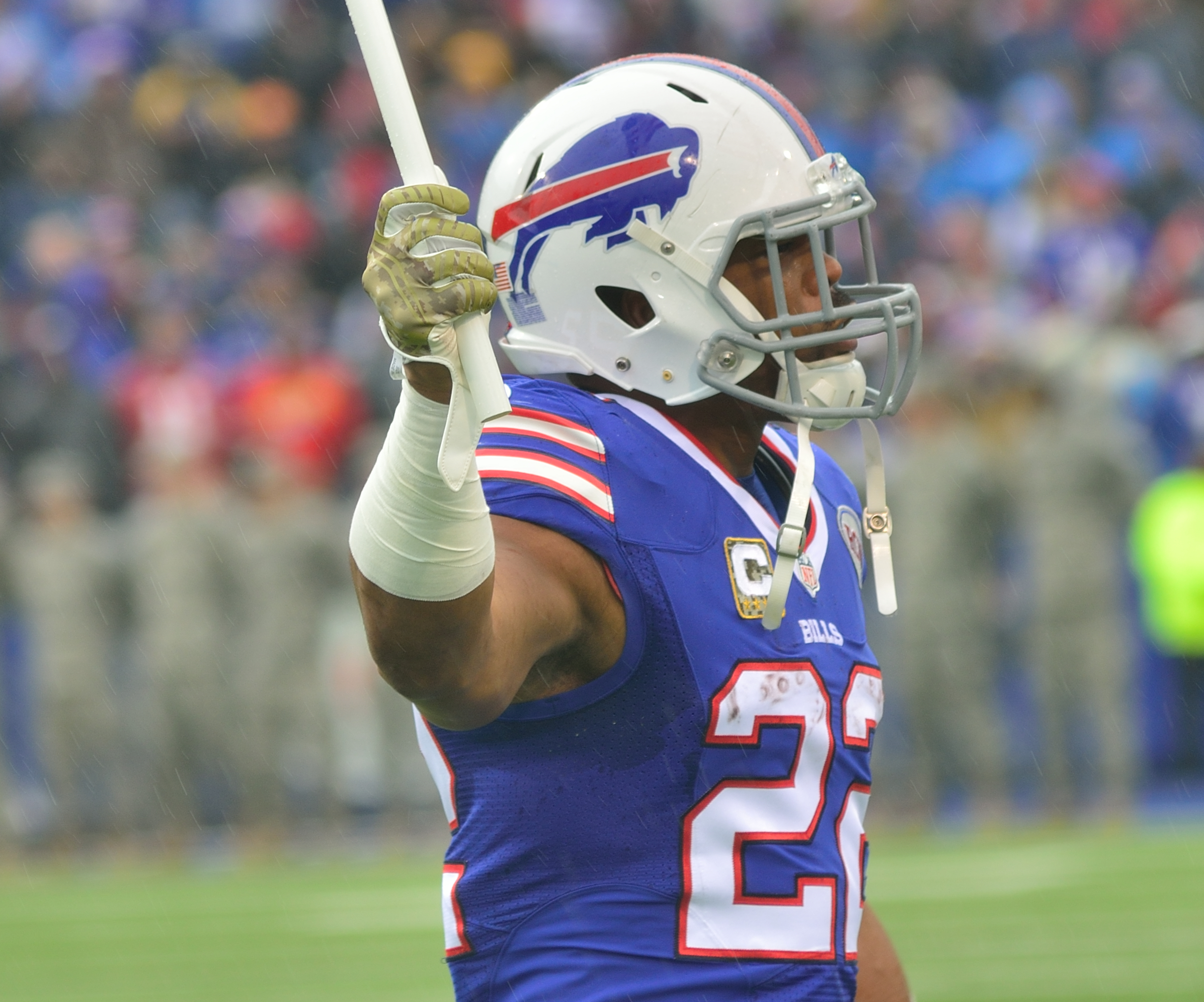
- Jackson with the Buffalo Bills in 2014

No. 23, 22
- Position: Running back

Personal information
- Born: February 20, 1981 (age 45); Fort Worth, Texas, U.S.
- Listed height: 6 ft 1 in (1.85 m)
- Listed weight: 215 lb (98 kg)

Career information
- High school: Lamar (Arlington, Texas)
- College: Coe (1999–2002)
- NFL draft: 2003: undrafted

Career history
- Sioux City Bandits (2004–2005); Buffalo Bills (2006–2014); → Rhein Fire (2006); Seattle Seahawks (2015)

Awards and highlights
- UIF co-Most Valuable Player (2005); Consensus DIII All-American (2002); IFL Hall of Fame

Career NFL statistics
- Rushing attempts: 1,305
- Rushing yards: 5,746
- Rushing touchdowns: 30
- Receptions: 354
- Receiving yards: 2,897
- Receiving touchdowns: 9
- Stats at Pro Football Reference

Frederick George Jackson (born February 20, 1981) is an American former professional football player who was a running back in the National Football League (NFL). He played college football for the Coe Kohawks. After going undrafted in 2003 and playing two indoor football seasons and later in NFL Europe, Jackson spent nine seasons with the Buffalo Bills, becoming their third all-time leading rusher. In the 2015 season, he was the oldest active running back in the NFL.

== Early life ==
Jackson attended Lamar High School in Arlington, Texas, where he played football. Although he was a member of the powerful Lamar Vikings teams of the late 1990s, he never started a game in his two years on the varsity team because he was considered too small (5 ft 8 in, 160 pounds) and too slow. He began his senior year as a third-string running back, and only after a knee injury to starter Justin Faust (headed to Stanford), was he elevated to second-string behind Tommicus Walker (headed to TCU).

Also a standout sprinter, Jackson was a state-qualifier in the 100 meters and recorded a time of 21.78 seconds as a member of the Lamar 4 × 100 m relay squad, breaking the previous record.

During his senior year, 14 of his teammates signed letters of intent to play college football, but he did not receive any offers. Instead, Wayne Phillips, his Nichols Junior High School football coach, arranged for him and his brother to enroll into Coe College, a Division III school that does not offer athletic scholarships.

== College career ==
At Coe College, Jackson was named to four All-American teams in 2002, rushing for 2,702 yards and 29 touchdowns. He was a two-time Iowa Intercollegiate Athletic Conference MVP for the Kohawks. He was also the MVP of the 2003 Stars Bowl. He graduated in 2003 with a degree in sociology.

== Professional career ==
=== Sioux City Bandits ===
After trying out for the Chicago Bears, Denver Broncos and Green Bay Packers, he went on to play indoor football for the Sioux City Bandits. Jackson played two seasons for the Bandits in the National Indoor Football League (2004) and United Indoor Football (2005). He was named the 2005 UIF co-MVP in 2005; in 18 games he ran for 1,770 yards and scored 53 touchdowns (40 rushing, 11 pass receiving and 2 on kick returns). During this time, he also worked as a youth counselor at Boys & Girls Home Family Services to make ends meet. His jersey number was retired by the Bandits in 2008.

While with the Bandits in 2004, Jackson's childhood home in Arlington, Texas, was torn down to make way for Cowboys Stadium, which replaced Texas Stadium as the home of the Dallas Cowboys in 2009. Jackson played in his former neighborhood on November 13, 2011, when the Bills faced the Cowboys.

=== Buffalo Bills ===
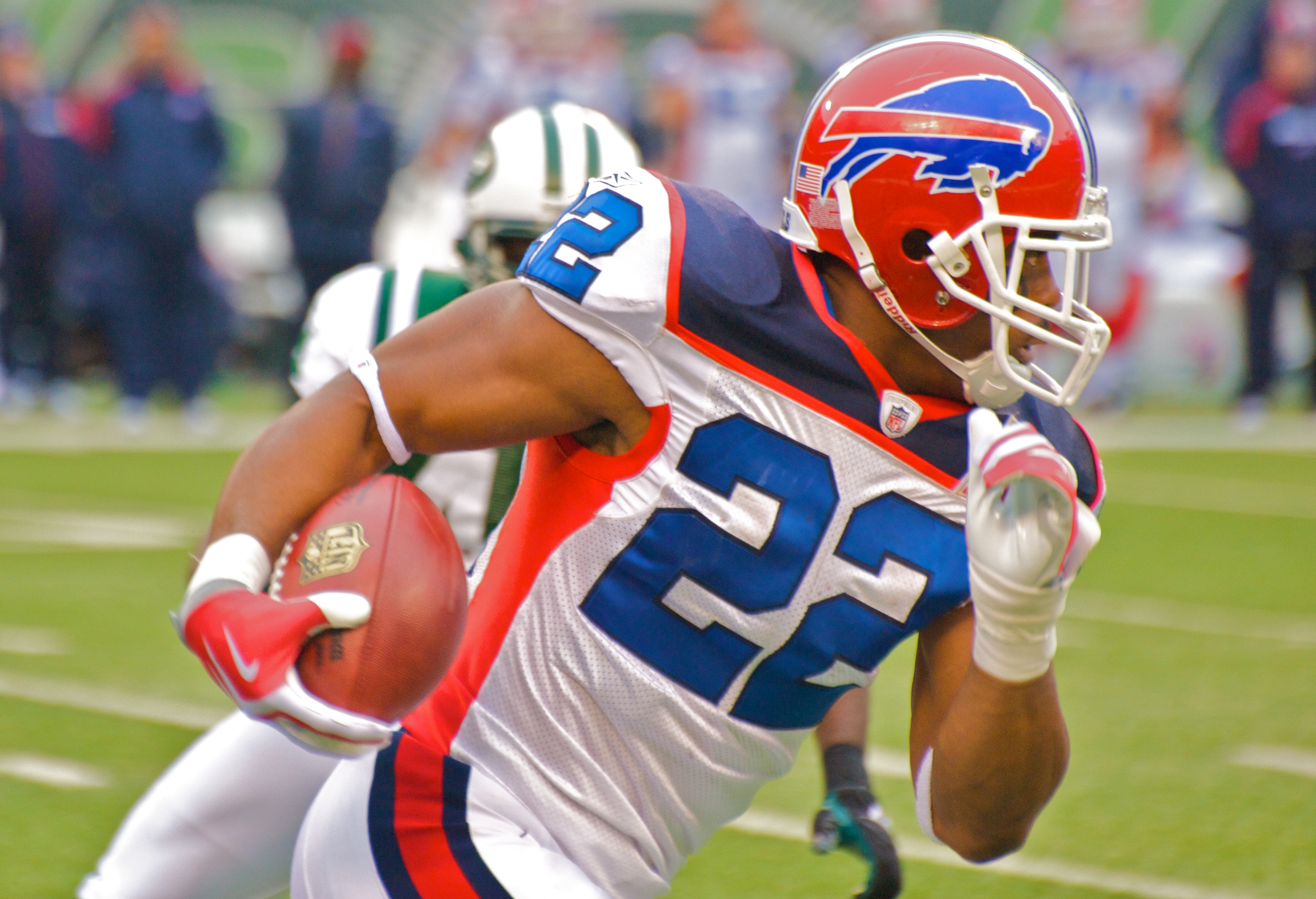
Jackson with the Bills in 2009

Jackson signed with the Buffalo Bills on January 19, 2006. Bills general manager Marv Levy was also a Coe College alumnus. Jackson was allocated to NFL Europe to play for the Rhein Fire. During the 2006 NFL Europe season, Jackson led the team with 731 rushing yards.

Jackson spent the entire 2006 NFL season on the Bills' practice squad. He made his first career start against the Washington Redskins in 2007, rushing for 82 yards while catching four passes for 69 yards in a Bills victory. He became the first Division III running back to start an NFL game since December 24, 2000, when former Ferrum College running back Chris Warren started for the Philadelphia Eagles against the Cincinnati Bengals.

In a 2007 victory over the Miami Dolphins, Jackson rushed for 115 yards with a long of 27 yards to top the 100-yard rushing mark for the first time in his NFL career. Teammate Marshawn Lynch rushed for 107 yards, marking the first time the Buffalo Bills had two players rush for 100-plus yards in the same game since 1996 when Thurman Thomas and Darick Holmes accomplished the feat. In the 2007 season, Jackson appeared in eight games and finished with 58 carries for 300 rushing yards and had 22 receptions for 190 receiving yards.

In Week 17 of the 2008 season, Jackson had 27 carries for 136 rushing yards against the New England Patriots. In the 2008 season, Jackson had 130 carries for 571 rushing yards and three rushing touchdowns to go along with 37 receptions for 317 receiving yards in 16 games and three starts.

Before the 2009 season, Jackson signed a four-year contract extension to stay with the Bills.

In Week 2 of the 2009 season, Jackson had 28 carries for 163 rushing yards in the 33–20 victory over the Tampa Bay Buccaneers. At the end of the 2009 season, after winning the starting job from Lynch in Week 12, Jackson eclipsed the 1,000-yard rushing mark for the first time in his career with 1,062 yards and two touchdowns. He also set a career-high in catches with 46 for 371 yards and two more scores and also completed a 27-yard touchdown pass. Jackson also had 1,014 kickoff return yards making him the first player in NFL history to compile 1,000 rushing and 1,000 kickoff return yards. The 2,516 combined yards are the fifth highest all-purpose yards total in NFL history. In Week 17 of the 2009 season, versus the Indianapolis Colts, Jackson had a career day with 212 rushing yards and a receiving touchdown.

In the 2010 season, Jackson finished with 222 carries for 927 rushing yards and five rushing touchdowns to go along with 31 receptions for 215 receiving yards and two receiving touchdowns in 16 games and 13 starts.

In 2011, Jackson was having his best season to date, as the team's undisputed starting running back. Jackson had six 100-yard rushing games in the first ten weeks. During a Week 11 loss to Miami, however, Jackson suffered a fractured fibula. Jackson was placed on injured reserve later in the week and missed the remainder of the season. The Bills had already been on a three-game losing streak when Jackson was injured, but lost all games but one for the rest of the 2011 season without Jackson. For his strong performance he was named to the USA Today All Joe Team as he was no longer Pro Bowl eligible. He was ranked 83rd by his fellow players on the NFL Top 100 Players of 2012.

On May 5, 2012, Jackson signed a two-year contract extension, keeping him with the Bills until 2015. He finished the 2012 season with 115 carries for 437 rushing yards and three rushing touchdowns to go along with 34 receptions for 217 receiving yards and one receiving touchdown in ten games and eight starts.

Jackson had arguably the best season of his career in 2013. Despite playing as the backup to C. J. Spiller most weeks, Jackson accumulated 1,283 yards from scrimmage and scored 10 total touchdowns.

On October 19, 2014, Jackson suffered a groin injury against the Minnesota Vikings. He returned on November 9 against the Kansas City Chiefs. Jackson finished the 2014 season with 141 carries for 525 rushing yards to go along with 66 receptions for 501 receiving yards and one receiving touchdown in 14 games and nine starts.

On August 31, 2015, the Bills released Jackson as part of roster cuts. He finished third on the Bills' all-time rushing list.

=== Seattle Seahawks ===
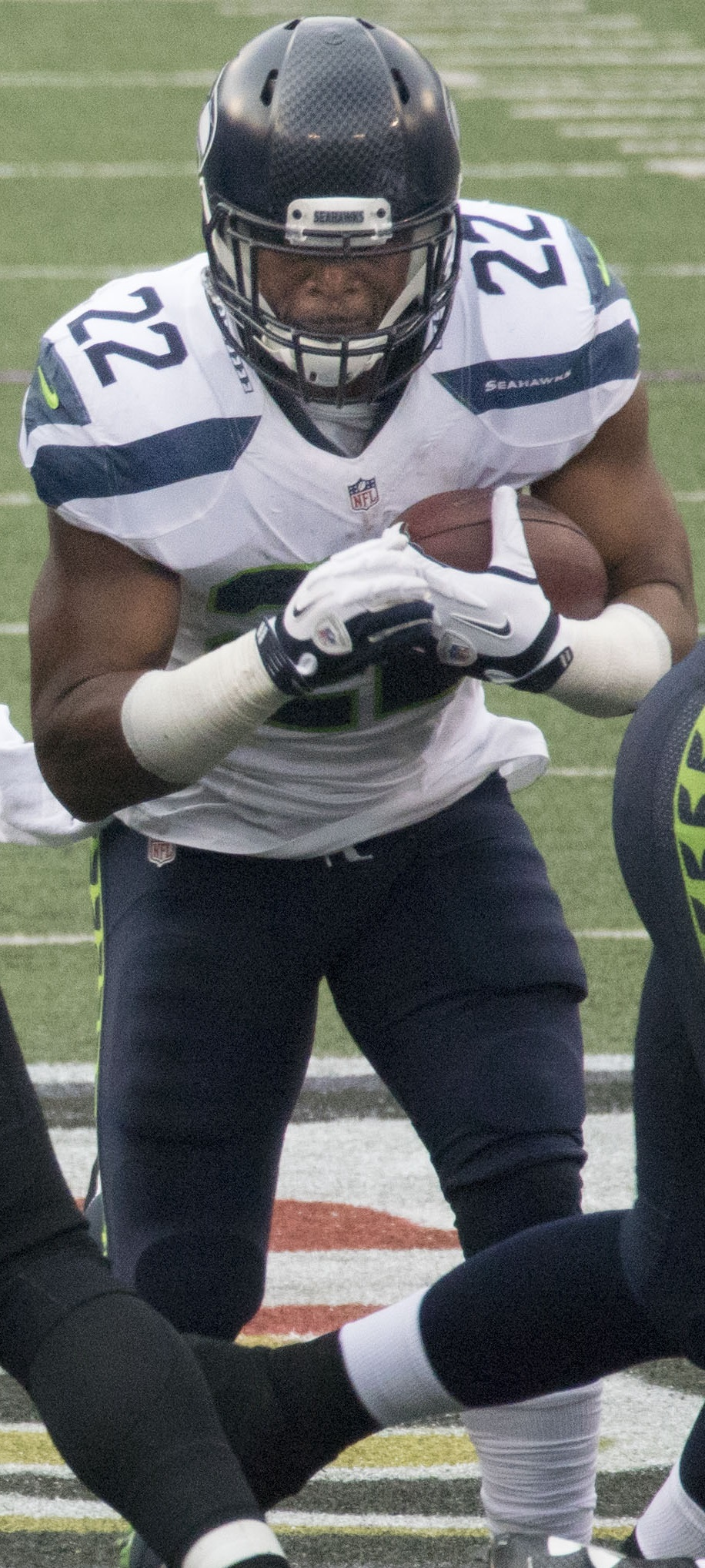
Jackson with the Seahawks in 2015

On September 7, 2015, Jackson signed a one-year deal with the Seattle Seahawks, reuniting him with former Buffalo teammate Marshawn Lynch. He finished the 2015 season with 26 carries for 100 rushing yards and 32 receptions for 257 receiving yards and two receiving touchdowns.

The Seahawks clinched a Wild Card berth in the playoffs, marking Jackson's first time participating in the postseason. On January 10, the Seahawks beat the Vikings 10–9 in the Wild Card Round of the playoffs, giving Jackson his first career playoff win.

=== The Spring League ===
After spending the 2016 season out of football, Jackson announced an attempt at a comeback by signing with The Spring League, a league formed from the remains of the former Fall Experimental Football League, for its summer 2017 showcase.

=== Retirement ===
In April 2018, Jackson confirmed he was in talks with the Bills to sign a one-day contract and formally retire as a member of the team. The contract was signed, and Jackson subsequently retired, on April 18, 2018.

== NFL career statistics ==
Year	Team	Games		Rushing					Receiving					Fumbles	
Year	Team	GP	GS	Att	Yds	Avg	Lng	TD	Rec	Yds	Avg	Lng	TD	Fum	Lost
2007	BUF	8	1	58	300	5.2	27	0	22	190	8.6	54	0	0	0
2008	BUF	16	3	130	571	4.4	32	3	37	317	8.6	65	0	2	1
2009	BUF	16	11	237	1,062	4.5	43	2	46	371	8.1	21	2	3	2
2010	BUF	16	13	222	927	4.2	39	5	31	215	6.9	65T	2	5	2
2011	BUF	10	10	170	934	5.5	80	6	39	442	11.3	49	0	2	2
2012	BUF	10	8	115	437	3.8	15	3	34	217	6.4	34	1	5	4
2013	BUF	16	6	207	896	4.3	59	9	47	387	8.2	37	1	3	0
2014	BUF	14	9	141	525	3.7	38	2	66	501	7.6	34	1	5	0
2015	SEA	16	0	26	100	3.8	16	0	32	257	8.0	26	2	1	1
Career		122	61	1,305	5,746	4.4	80	30	354	2,897	8.2	65	9	26	12

== Outside of football ==
=== Personal life ===
Jackson is married and has four children.

=== Car accident ===
On October 20, 2015, it was initially reported that a drag race just outside the Seahawks' training facility between Fred Jackson and teammate Marshawn Lynch ended with Jackson crashing his Corvette, first into a planter box and then a stop sign. However police later denied the report and said he was simply driving too fast.

=== Television ===
Jackson had his own television program airing on WBBZ-TV. The Fred Jackson Show aired Mondays during football season. It debuted on September 10, 2012, and ran for Jackson's last three years in Buffalo. In 2018, Jackson signed with MSG Western New York to be an analyst for its weekly postgame series, Bills Tonight.

Jackson is now a part of Spectrum News One's post game show, Buffalo End Zone.

=== Steakhouse ===
Along with fellow Bills alumni Brian Moorman and Terrence McGee and other prominent Buffalo figures, Jackson operated SEAR, a high-end steakhouse located within The Avant in downtown Buffalo. The restaurant closed as a result of the coronavirus pandemic.

=== FJ22 Sock for Charity ===
In October 2018, Jackson teamed up with Codes Socks LLC to create a Signature Series Sock that will benefit a local charity called UB HEALS.
