= Kantoh Collegiate American Football Association =

American college football league in Kantō, Japan

- Sport: American football
- Founded: 1934
- Motto: ONE PLAY, ONE SKY（ひとつ青い空の下、最高のワンプレーを。）
- Sports fielded: 1 (American football)
- Headquarters: C/O AJINOMOTO STADIUM, 376–3, Nishimachi, Chofu-shi, Tokyo, Japan
- Region: Kanto, Japan
- Most recent champion: (Waseda Bigbears football)
- Website: www.kcfa.jp

The Kantoh Collegiate American Football Association is an American college football league made up of colleges and universities in the Kanto region of Japan.

== Overview ==
The Kanto League is the main university football league in eastern Japan. The league is divided into six divisions.

Under the previous format, the league winners played against teams from western Japan in the Koshien Bowl.

In 2024, the new format allows the top three schools to compete in the Koshien Bowl Tournament.

Other participating schools in the tournament are the top three schools from the Kansai Collegiate American Football League Division 1, and the winners of each league from Tohoku, Hokuriku, and Chugoku-Shikoku.

== Member schools ==
=== Division 1 ===
Prior to the 2014 season, the Kantoh league had two conferences. The winners of each conference would then play in the Azuma Bowl, to determine league champion. Starting in 2014, the league switched to a two division format, the Top 8 and Big 8. With the new format, there would be no championship game and the Top 8 conference would be the highest level of play, making the winner of that division the overall conference champion.

==== Top 8 ====
Institution	Location	Founded	Type	Nickname	Team Founded	Colors
Hosei University 法政大学	Chiyoda, Tokyo	1880	Private	Orange	1935	Blue and Orange
Waseda University 早稲田大学	Shinjuku, Tokyo	1882	Private	Big Bears	1934	Maroon and White
Keio University 慶應義塾大学	Minato, Tokyo	1858	Private	Unicorns	1935	Red and Blue
Rikkyo University 立教大学	Toshima, Tokyo	1874	Private	Rushers	1934	Purple and White
University of Tokyo 東京大学	Tokyo	1877	National	Warriors	1957	Blue
Meiji University 明治大学	Tokyo	1881	Private	Griffins	1934	Gold, Navy, and Yellow
J. F. Oberlin University 桜美林大学	Machida, Tokyo	1921	Private	Three Nails Crowns	1968	Maroon and Gold
Chuo University 中央大学	Hachiōji, Tokyo	1885	Private	Racoons	1967	Blue

==== Big 8 ====
Institution	Location	Founded	Type	Nickname	Team Founded	Colors
Komazawa University 駒澤大學	Setagaya, Tokyo	1592	Private	Blue Tide	1972	
Aoyama Gakuin University 青山学院大学	Shibuya, Tokyo	1874	Private	Lightning		Green and White
Nippon Sport Science University 日本体育大学	Setagaya, Tokyo	1893	Private	Triumphant Lion		
Kokushikan University 国士舘大学	Setagaya, Tokyo	1917	Private	Rhinoceros		
Yokohama National University 横浜国立大学	Yokohama, Kanagawa	1876	National	Mastiffs	1971	Blue and Orange
Teikyo University 帝京大学	Itabashi, Tokyo	1931	Private	Gladiator		
Meiji Gakuin University 明治学院大学	Yokohama, Kanagawa	1863	Private	Saints		Navy and Yellow
Tokai University 東海大学	Hiratsuka, Kanagawa	1942	Private	Tritons	1965	Blue and Silver

=== Division 2 ===
In the 2025 season, Block B will have nine teams, so they will be divided into a first group of five teams and a second group of four teams, and will compete in a first and second league. The first league will be a round-robin format within the group, with the top three schools in Group 1 and the top two schools in Group 2 advancing to the second upper league, and the bottom two schools each moving on to the second lower league.

==== Block A ====
Institution	Location	Founded	Type	Nickname	Team Founded	Colors
Seikei University 成蹊大学	Musashino, Tokyo	1906	Private	Zelkovas		
Kanagawa University 神奈川大学	Kanagawa-ku, Yokohama, Kanagawa	1929	Private	Atoms	1974	White, Blue
Science Tokyo 東京科学大学	Meguro, Tokyo	2024 (Tokyo Tech: 1881)	National	Buffaloes	1987	
National Defense Academy 防衛大学校	Yokosuka, Kanagawa	1953	Public	Cadets	1954	
International Christian University 国際基督教大学	Mitaka, Tokyo	1949	Private (Christian)	Apostles	1963	Green
University of Electro-Communications 電気通信大学	Chōfu, Tokyo	1918	National	Crashers		
Saitama University 埼玉大学	Saitama, Saitama	1873	National	Primrose		
Tokyo Gakugei University 東京学芸大学	Koganei, Tokyo	1873	National	Snails		

==== Block B ====
Institution	Group	Location	Founded	Type	Nickname	Team Founded	Colors
Senshu University 専修大学	1	Chiyoda, Tokyo	1880	Private	Green Machine	1963	Green
Hitotsubashi University 一橋大学	2	Kunitachi, Tokyo	1876	National	Crimson	1967	Crimson
University of Tsukuba 筑波大学	2	Tsukuba, Ibaraki	1872	National	Excaliburs		Light Blue
Shibaura Tech 芝浦工業大学	1	Koto, Tokyo	1927	Private	Fighting Engineers		Green
Kanto Gakuin University 関東学院大学	1	Kanazawa-ku, Yokohama, Kanagawa	1884	Private	Hurricanes	1964	
Sophia University 上智大学	2	Chiyoda, Tokyo	1913	Private	Golden Eagles	1969	
Tokyo A&T 東京農工大学	2	Fuchū, Tokyo	1949	National	Blasters		
Kogakuin University 工学院大学	1	Shinjuku, Tokyo	1887	Private	Crash Machines	1976	
Nihon University 日本大学	1	Chiyoda, Tokyo	1889	Private		2024	

=== Division 3 ===
==== A Block ====
Institution	Location	Founded	Type	Nickname	Colors
Seijo University 成城大学	Setagaya, Tokyo	1950	Private	Orange Beams	
Chiba University 千葉大学	Chiba, Chiba	1949	National	Poseidon	
Ryutsu Keizai University 流通経済大学	Ryūgasaki, Ibaraki	1967	Private	Dragons	
Dokkyo University 獨協大学	Sōka, Saitama	1883	Private	Green Monsters	
Rissho University 立正大学	Shinagawa, Tokyo	1872	Private	Bulldogs	
Sōka University 創価大学	Hachiōji, Tokyo	1971	Private	Souka Blue Lions	
Daito Bunka University 大東文化大学	Itabashi, Tokyo	1923	Private	Wild Boars	

==== B Block ====
Institution	Location	Founded	Type	Nickname	Colors
Takushoku University 拓殖大学	Bunkyo, Tokyo	1900	Private	Rattlesnakes	Orange and Black
Tokyo University of Science 東京理科大学	Shinjuku, Tokyo	1881	Private	Rascals	
Asia University of Japan 亜細亜大学	Musashino, Tokyo	1941	Private	Angels	
Chiba University of Commerce 千葉商科大学	Ichikawa, Chiba	1950	Private	Lycaonpictus	
Niigata University 新潟大学	Niigata, Niigata	1870	National	Tigers	
Yokohama City University 横浜市立大学	Yokohama, Kanagawa	1882	Public	Fighting Seagulls	
Hakuoh University 白鴎大学	Oyama, Tochigi	1986	Private	Rascals	

==== C Block ====
Institution	Location	Founded	Type	Nickname	Colors
Toyo University 東洋大学	Bunkyo, Tokyo	1887	Private	Vikings	
Musashi University 武蔵大学	Nerima, Tokyo	1922	Private	Pheasants	
Tokyo Keizai University 東京経済大学	Kokubunji, Tokyo	1900	Private	Falcons	
Tokyo City University 東京都市大学	Setagaya, Tokyo	1949	Private	Helios	
Tokyo University of Agriculture 東京農業大学	Setagaya, Tokyo	1891	Private	Aggies	Green
Tamagawa University 玉川大学	Machida, Tokyo	1929	Private	Stallions	

==== D Block ====
Institution	Location	Founded	Type	Nickname	Colors
Gakushuin University 学習院大学	Toshima, Tokyo	1847	Private	Generals	Dark Blue and Pink
Tokyo International University 東京国際大学	Kawagoe, Saitama	1965	Private	Dolphins	
Tokyo University of Foreign Studies 東京外国語大学	Fuchū, Tokyo	1873	National	Phantoms	
Tokyo Metropolitan University 東京都立大学	Hachiōji, Tokyo	1949	Public	Scrappers	
Takachiho University 高千穂大学	Suginami, Tokyo	1903	Private	Eagles	
University of Yamanashi 山梨大学	Kōfu/Tamaho, Yamanashi	2002	National	Wyverns	

=== Medical and Dental Division ===
Institution	Location	Founded	Type	Nickname	Colors
Jikei University School of Medicine 東京慈恵会医科大学	Minato, Tokyo		Private	Crickets	
Dokkyo Medical University 獨協医科大学	Mibu, Tochigi	1973	Private	Silver Dum Dums	
University of Tokyo School of Medicine 東京大学医学部	Tokyo		National	Scorpions	
Showa Medical University 昭和医科大学	Tokyo	1928	Private	Maddogs	
Nihon University School of Medicine, School of Dental, and School of Dental in Matsudo 日本大学医学部・歯学部・松戸歯学部	Chiyoda, Tokyo		Private	Boars	
Saitama Medical University 埼玉医科大学	Moroyama, Saitama	1892	Private	Mulberry	
Keio University School of Medicine 慶應義塾大学医学部	Minato, Tokyo		Private	Unicorns	

=== 7-a-side American football Division ===
==== A Block ====
Institution	Location	Founded	Type	Nickname	Colors
Tokyo University of Technology 東京工科大学	Hachioji, Tokyo	1947	Private	Cerberus	
Meikai University Dental school 明海大学歯学部	Urayasu, Chiba	1970	Private	Crusaders	
Kyorin University 杏林大学	Tokyo	1970	Private	Cavaliers	
The Nippon Dental University 日本歯科大学	Chiyodaku, Tokyo	1907	Private	Bombers	

==== B Block ====
Institution	Location	Founded	Type	Nickname	Colors
Meisei University 明星大学	Hino, Tokyo	1951	Private	Silver Knights	
Tokyo Medical University 東京医科大学	Minato, Tokyo	1916	Private	Meribibazu	
Surugadai University 駿河台大学	Hanno, Saitama	1987	Private	Cougars	
Bunkyo University / Science Tokyo Medical School Joint Team	Shinagawa, Tokyo; Bunkyō, Tokyo	1927; 2024	Private; National	Odin; Stones	

==== Not participating in league match ====
Institution	Location	Founded	Type	Nickname	Colors
Nippon Tech 日本工業大学	Miyashiro, Saitama	1907	Private	River Horse	
St. Marianna University School of Medicine 聖マリアンナ医科大学	Kawasaki, Kanagawa	1971	Private	Roadrunners	
Toho University School of Medicine 東邦大学医学部	Ota, Tokyo	1925	Private		
Tsurumi University School of Dental 鶴見大学歯学部	Yokohama, Kanagawa	1953	Private		

== Past champions ==
- 1947 – Meiji
- 1948 – Keio
- 1949 – Keio
- 1950 – Keio
- 1951 – Rikkyo
- 1952 – Rikkyo
- 1953 – Rikkyo
- 1954 – Rikkyo
- 1955 – Nihon
- 1956 – Nihon
- 1957 – Nihon
- 1958 – Nihon
- 1959 – Nihon
- 1960 – Rikkyo
- 1961 – Nihon
- 1962 – Nihon
- 1963 – Nihon
- 1964 – Nihon
- 1965 – Rikkyo
- 1966 – Nihon
- 1967 – Nihon
- 1968 – Meiji
- 1969 – Nihon
- 1970 – Nihon
- 1971 – Nihon
- 1972 – Hosei
- 1973 – Nihon
- 1974 – Nihon
- 1975 – Meiji
- 1976 – Meiji
- 1977 – Nihon
- 1978 – Nihon
- 1979 – Nihon
- 1980 – Nihon
- 1981 – Nihon
- 1982 – Nihon
- 1983 – Nihon
- 1984 – Nihon
- 1985 – Meiji
- 1986 – Nihon
- 1987 – Nihon
- 1988 – Nihon
- 1989 – Nihon
- 1990 – Nihon
- 1991 – Senshu
- 1992 – Hosei
- 1993 – Nippon Sport Science
- 1994 – Hosei
- 1995 – Hosei
- 1996 – Hosei
- 1997 – Hosei
- 1998 – Hosei
- 1999 – Hosei
- 2000 – Hosei
- 2001 – Hosei
- 2002 – Waseda
- 2003 – Hosei
- 2004 – Hosei
- 2005 – Hosei
- 2006 – Hosei
- 2007 – Nihon
- 2008 – Hosei
- 2009 – Hosei
- 2010 – Waseda
- 2011 – Nihon
- 2012 – Hosei
- 2013 – Nihon
- 2014 – Nihon
- 2015 – Waseda
- 2016 – Waseda
- 2017 – Nihon
- 2018 – Waseda
- 2019 – Waseda
- 2020 – Nihon
- 2021 – Hosei
- 2022 – Waseda
- 2023 – Hosei
- 2024 – Hosei
- 2025 – Waseda

== Number of championships ==
Institution	Number of championships
Nihon University	35
Hosei University	20
Waseda University	8
Rikkyo University	6
Meiji University	5
Keio University	3
Senshu University	1
Nippon Sport Science University	1

== Main match venues ==
- Aminovital Field (Ajinomoto Stadium's sub-ground)
- Komazawa Olympic Park, No.2 ball sports ground
- Yokohama Stadium
- Tokyo Dome
- Fujitsu Stadium Kawasaki
- Spears EDORIKU Field (Edogawa Stadium)

In addition, the grounds of each university will be used.
