= List of Mexican collegiate American football programs =

This is a list of the schools and universities in Mexico that have college football teams. College football in Mexico is overseen by the National Student Organization of American Football.

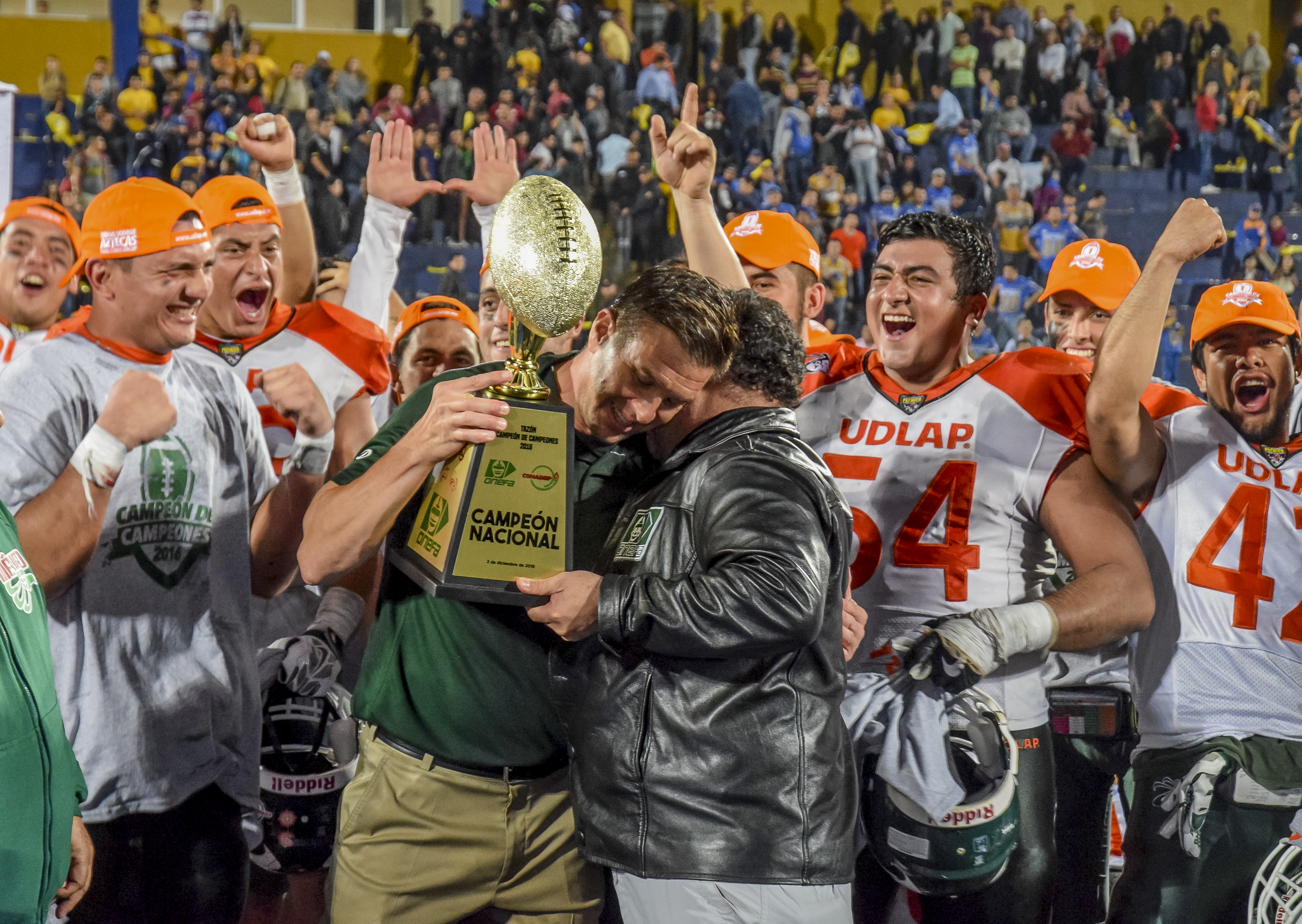
Aztecas UDLAP, National Champions in 2016.

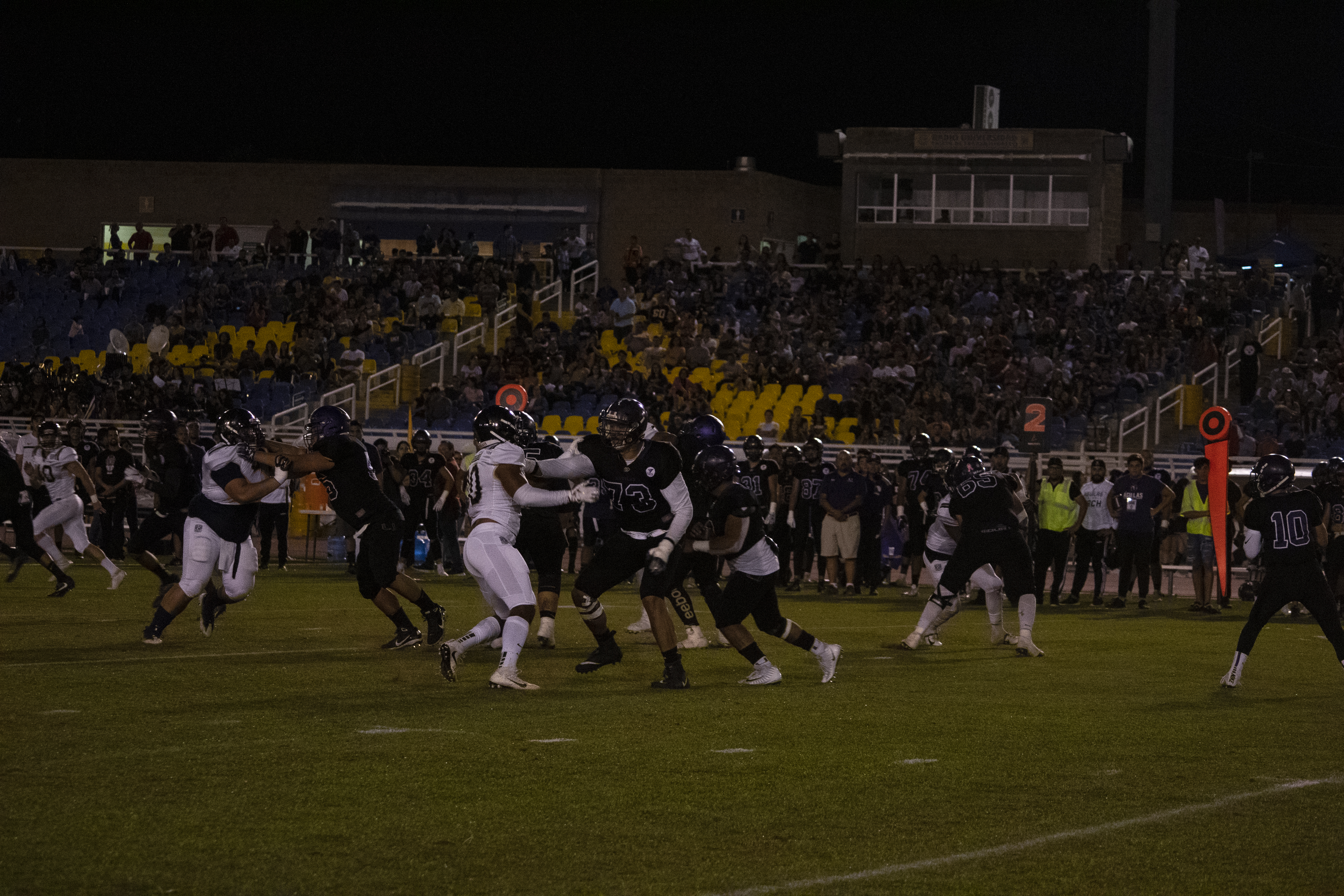
Match between the oldest college football team in Mexico, the Pumas CU and the Águilas UACH.

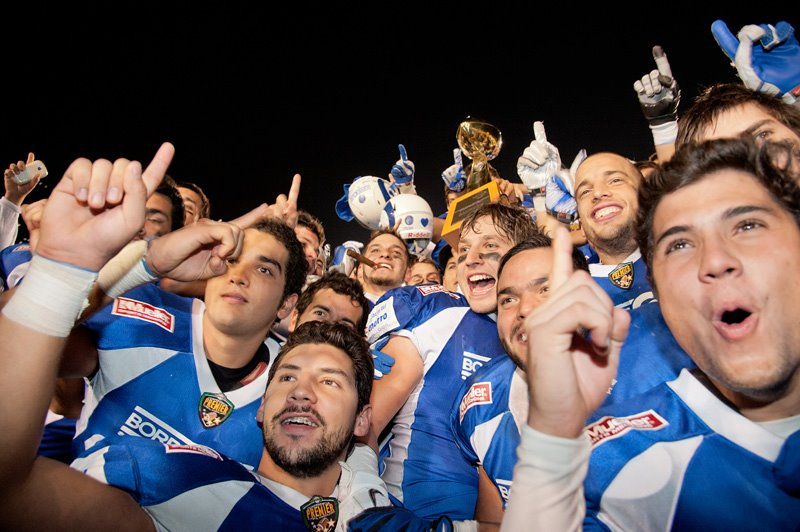
Borregos Salvajes Monterrey won the National Championship four times in a row from 2004 to 2007, the second team to achieve this feat after Cóndores UNAM.

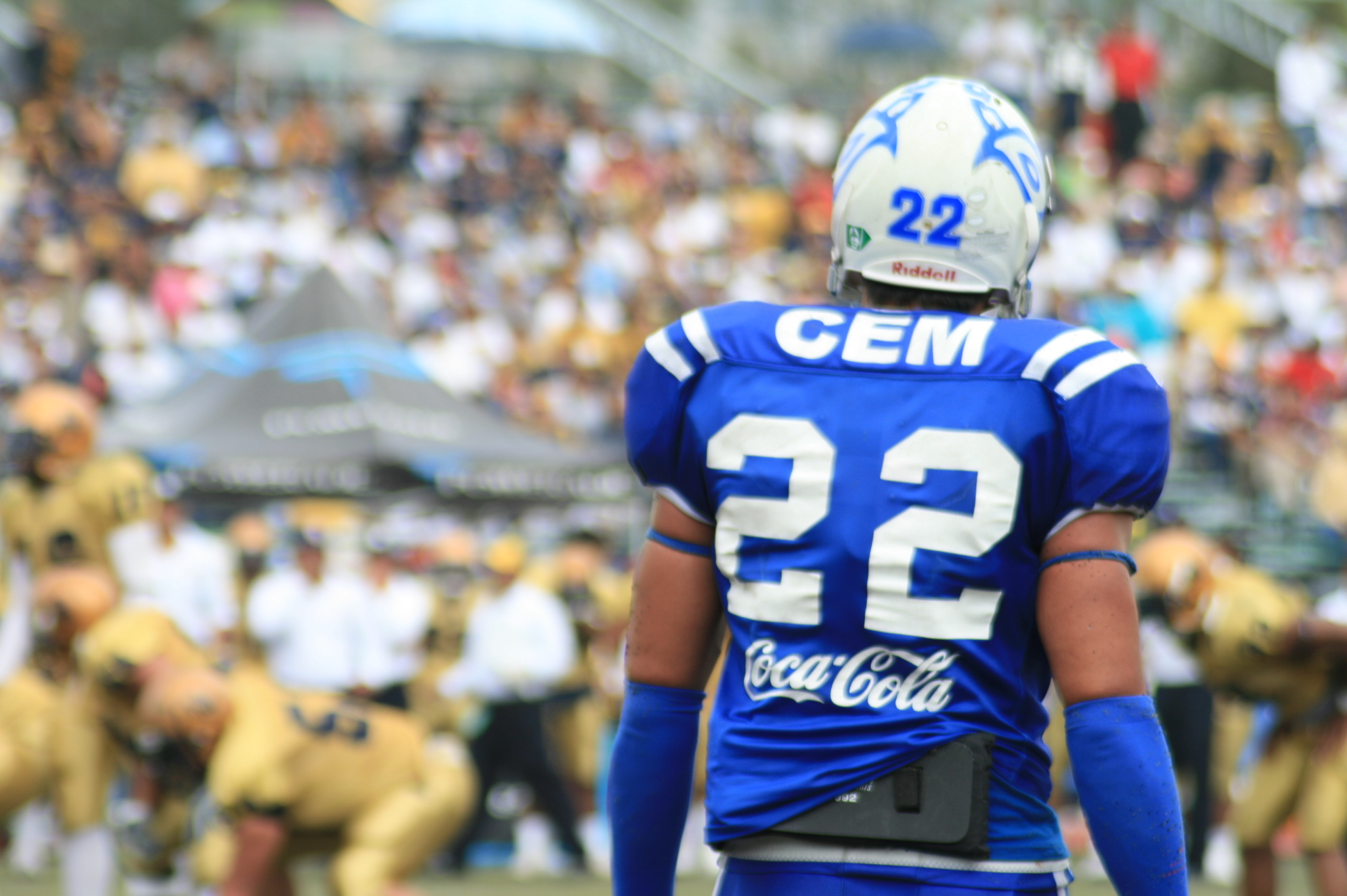
A player of the Borregos Salvajes CEM. The team won two National Championships, but disappeared in 2016.

== Current programs ==
=== Jacinto Licea Conference ===
Team	Nickname	City	State	First Played	Affiliation
Anáhuac México	Leones	Huixquilucan	State of Mexico	2011 (Note: The Universidad Anáhuac had a representative team known as Halcones that played during the 1987 season, then the American football program disappeared and was created again in 2011, this time as Leones.)	Private
IPN Santo Tomás	Águilas Blancas	Miguel Hidalgo	Mexico City	1969	Public
IPN Zacatenco	Burros Blancos	Gustavo A. Madero	Mexico City	2006 (Note: Burros Blancos started playing in 1936 as the varsity team of the Instituto Politécnico Nacional, but the original team was disbanded in the sixties, when several teams were created to represent the IPN's different schools. Burros Blancos returned in 2006, now representing the IPN's Zacatenco campus.)	Public
ITESM	Borregos Salvajes	Monterrey	Nuevo León	1945	Private
ITESM Guadalajara	Borregos Salvajes	Zapopan	Jalisco	2012	Private
ITESM Mexico	Borregos Salvajes	Atizapán	State of Mexico	2016 (Note: In 2016, ITESM decided to join its three Greater Mexico City college football programs (ITESM CCM, ITESM CEM and ITESM Santa Fe) into one new team named Borregos Salvajes México.)	Private
ITESM Puebla	Borregos Salvajes	Puebla City	Puebla	2011	Private
ITESM Toluca	Borregos Salvajes	Toluca	State of Mexico	1995	Private
UAEM	Potros Salvajes	Toluca	State of Mexico	1958	Public
UANL	Auténticos Tigres	San Nicolás de los Garza	Nuevo León	1943	Public
UDLAP	Aztecas	Cholula	Puebla	1986	Private
UNAM	Pumas	Coyoacán	Mexico City	1927 (Note: The UNAM started playing college football as Pumas in 1927. In 1970, the UNAM created three teams: Águilas Reales, Cóndores and Guerrero Aztecas, replacing the Pumas. In 1998, the UNAM disbanded the three teams and returned to play as a single team known as Pumas.)	Public
UNAM FES Acatlán	Pumas	Naucalpan	State of Mexico	1978 (Note: Originally founded as Osos Acatlán and rebranded as Pumas Acatlán in 1998.)	Public
UVM	Linces	Naucalpan	State of Mexico	2005	Private

=== National Conference ===
Team	Nickname	City	State	First Played	Affiliation
Anáhuac Cancún	Leones	Cancún	Quintana Roo	2008	Private
Anáhuac Querétaro	Leones	Querétaro City	Querétaro	2017	Private
BUAP	Lobos	Puebla City	Puebla	2015	Public
CETYS	Zorros	Mexicali	Baja California	1964	Public
Chapingo	Toros Salvajes	Chapingo	State of Mexico	1937	Public
IPN	Búhos	Miguel Hidalgo	Mexico City	1969	Public
ITESM Querétaro	Borregos Salvajes	Querétaro City	Querétaro	2015	Private
ITSON	Potros	Ciudad Obregón	Sonora	1967	Public
Tepeyac	Frailes	Gustavo A. Madero	Mexico City	1993	Private
UABC Tijuana	Cimarrones	Tijuana	Baja California	2011	Public
UAC	Lobos	Saltillo	Coahuila	1989	Public
UACH	Águilas	Chihuahua City	Chihuahua	1958	Public
UACJ	Indios	Ciudad Juárez	Chihuahua	2021	Public
UAG	Tecos	Zapopan	Jalisco	2014 (Note: UAG's football program returned in 2014 after last playing in 2006.)	Private
UAT	Correcaminos	Ciudad Victoria	Tamaulipas	1996	Public
UDG	Leones Negros	Guadalajara	Jalisco	2017 (Note: The Leones Negros briefly played during one season in 1988. The team returned to college football in 2017.)	Public
ULM	Lobos	Celaya	Guanajuato	2021	Private
UV	Halcones	Xalapa	Veracruz	2003	Public

== Defunct programs ==
Team	Nickname	City	State	First Played	Last Played	Affiliation
Anáhuac Sur	Leones	Álvaro Obregón	Mexico City	1997	2006	Private
CGP	Centinelas	Miguel Hidalgo	Mexico City	1984	2018 (Note: In 2019, the Mexican senate approved the elimination of the Presidential Guard, the institution that the Centinelas represented; thus, the team was disbanded.)	Public
CUM	Gamos	Tláhuac	Mexico City	1996	2000	Private
ESEF	Tigrillos	Iztacalco	Mexico City	1938	1993	Public
ESIQIE IPN	Pieles Rojas	Gustavo A. Madero	Mexico City	1971 (Note: The team was established in 1971 as Pieles Rojas de Acción Deportiva. In 1977, the team joined to the Instituto Politécnico Nacional.)	2004 (Note: Before the start of the 2005 season, the IPN's authorities decided to merge the Pieles Rojas with the Águilas Blancas.)	Public
ITESM CCM	Borregos Salvajes	Tlalpan	Mexico City	1997	2015	Private
ITESM CEM	Borregos Salvajes	Atizapán	State of Mexico	1994	2015	Private
ITESM Chihuahua	Borregos Salvajes	Chihuahua City	Chihuahua	1996	2003	Private
ITESM Laguna	Borregos Salvajes	Torreón	Coahuila	1978	2003	Private
ITESM Santa Fe	Borregos Salvajes	Álvaro Obregón	Mexico City	2011	2015	Private
ITCH	Panteras	Chihuahua City	Chihuahua	1996	1996	Public
ITCJ	Liebres	Ciudad Juárez	Chihuahua	1996	1999	Public
ITH	Yaks	Hermosillo	Sonora	2002	2003	Public
ITL	Gatos Negros	Torreón	Coahuila	1970	1998	Public
ITLP	Lobos Marinos	La Paz	Baja California Sur	2013	2015	Public
ITQ	Zorros	Querétaro City	Querétaro	2014 (Note: The Zorros played from 1971 to 2008. After the 2008 season, the program briefly disappeared and returned in 2014.)	2016	Public
ITS	Burros Pardos	Saltillo	Coahuila	1952	2002	Public
ITT	Lagartos	Tlalnepantla	State of Mexico	1987	1991	Public
UAAAN	Buitres	Saltillo	Coahuila	1947	1998	Public
UAEM	Venados	Cuernavaca	Morelos	2000	2001	Public
UAM	Panteras Negras	Iztapalapa	Mexico City	1976	2002	Public
UAQ	Gatos Salvajes	Querétaro City	Querétaro	1993 (Note: The Gatos Salvajes competed during the 1988 season and then returned in 1993.)	2000	Public
UAS	Águilas	Culiacán	Sinaloa	2001	2003	Public
UAS Mazatlán	Halcones	Mazatlán	Sinaloa	2002	2002	Public
UAT Reynosa	Correcaminos	Reynosa	Tamaulipas	2010	2018 (Note: In 2019 the Universidad Autónoma de Tamaulipas decided to merge its two teams (Ciudad Victoria and Reynosa) into a single team.)	Public
UAT Tampico	Correcaminos	Tampico	Tamaulipas	1996	1997	Public
UIC	Misioneros	Tlalpan	Mexico City	1997	1999	Private
UMM	Leones	Monterrey	Nuevo León	2005	2011	Private
UNAM	Águilas Reales	Coyoacán	Mexico City	1970	1997	Public
UNAM	Cóndores	Coyoacán	Mexico City	1970	1997	Public
UNAM	Guerreros Aztecas	Coyoacán	Mexico City	1970	1997	Public
UNAM ENEP Aragón	Huracanes	Gustavo A. Madero	Mexico City	1981	1997	Public
UNISON	Búhos	Hermosillo	Sonora	2007	2016	Public
UR	Jaguares	Monterrey	Nuevo León	1975	2011	Private

== See also ==
- List of NCAA Division I FBS football programs
- List of NCAA Division I FCS football programs
- List of NCAA Division II football programs
- List of NCAA Division III football programs
- List of NAIA football programs
- List of junior college football programs in the United States
- List of colleges and universities with club football teams
- List of defunct college football teams
- List of Japanese collegiate American football programs
