= Heiwadai Bowl =

Annual football competition

- 平和台ボウル
- Conference tie-ins: Kyūshū Collegiate American Football Association, Chushikoku Collegiate American Football Association

The Heiwadai Bowl (平和台ボウル) is an annual college football bowl game played in Japan between the champions of the Kyūshū Collegiate American Football Association and the Chushikoku Collegiate American Football Association. The winner of the Heiwadai Bowl advances in the West Japan postseason, with a chance to play in the Koshien Bowl. The game is regulated by the Japan American Football Association.

== Game results ==
Game	Date	Chushikoku League Representative		Kyūshū League Representative		Site
1st	1985	Hiroshima	20	Kyushu	0	
2nd	1986	Yamaguchi	0	Fukuoka	20	Heiwadai Athletics Stadium
3rd	1987	Yamaguchi	0	Kyushu	35	Heiwadai Athletics Stadium
4th	1988	Hiroshima	15	Seinan Gakuin	19	Heiwadai Athletics Stadium
5th	1989	Hiroshima	34	Fukuoka	7	Heiwadai Athletics Stadium
6th	1990	Ehime	17	Seinan Gakuin	19	Heiwadai Athletics Stadium
7th	1991	Yamaguchi	14	Seinan Gakuin	6	Heiwadai Athletics Stadium
8th	1992	Yamaguchi	21	Kyushu	24	Hakatanomori Athletic Stadium
9th	1993	Hiroshima	27	Fukuoka	20	
10th	1994	Yamaguchi	6	Seinan Gakuin	13	
31st	2015	Hiroshima	7	Seinan Gakuin	17	Heiwadai Athletics Stadium

== Player of the Game Awards ==
=== MVP ===
The most valuable player award was given from 1991 to 2009.

Year	MVP	Team	Position
1991	門出 知	Yamaguchi	QB
1992	Shiozuka Yuji	Kyushu	WR
1993	Hisato Katsura	Hiroshima	QB
