= HUS Wolves football =

Hokkaido University of Science in college football

2017 HUS Wolves football team
- First season: 1988
- Location: Sapporo, Hokkaido, Japan
- Conference: Hokkaido American Football Association
- Division: Division 1
- Colors: Orange and Black
- Website: HUS Wolves

The HUS Wolves football program, established in 1988, represents the Hokkaido University of Science in college football. HUS is a member of the Hokkaido American Football Association.

== Nickname ==
Between 1988 and 2014 the university was known as the Hokkaido Institute of Technology and the football team was known as the Madwolves. When the university changed its name in 2014 to Hokkaido University of Science, the football team became the Wolves.
