= Busan National University of Education =

University

- 부산교육대학교
- Type: Public
- Established: 1946; 80 years ago
- President: Yun-Su Ha (the 6th President)
- Undergraduates: 1,762
- Postgraduates: 565
- Location: Busan, South Korea; 35.195993°N 129.074894°E
- Website: https://eng.bnue.ac.kr/

- Busan National University of Education
- Hangul: 부산교육대학교
- Hanja: 釜山敎育大學校
- RR: Busan gyoyuk daehakgyo
- MR: Pusan kyoyuk taehakkyo

The Busan National University of Education is a government-supported institution which provides training for future public-school teachers in South Korea. The campus is located in the Yeonje-gu district of Busan Metropolitan City. The university offers graduate and undergraduate programs, and enrolls 1,762 undergraduate and 565 graduate students. A primary-level lab school with an enrollment of 768 students is located on the campus. The university's current president, its third, is Sung-Taek Park.

== Academic departments ==
=== Undergraduate ===
- Education
- Ethics education
- Korean language education
- Social studies education
- Mathematics education
- Science education
- Physical education
- Music education
- Fine arts education
- Practical arts education
- Early childhood education
- English education
- Computer education

== History ==
The school was established shortly after national liberation, on September 2, 1946. At the time it was known as Busan Normal School (부산사범학교) and provided training for elementary-school teachers. It was expanded to cover secondary teachers in 1955, and became Busan Teachers' College. In 1961, it was reorganized and renamed as Busan National College of Education. It became a four-year college in 1981, and a university in 1993. The graduate school was established in 1996.

== Sister universities ==
BNUE maintains sisterhood relationships with seven universities in four countries: Australia's Central Queensland University, China's Hangzhou Teachers College, Japan's Shimane University and Fukuoka University of Education, and the USA's Montclair State University, Oklahoma State University, and Shenandoah University.

== See also ==
- List of national universities in South Korea
- List of universities and colleges in South Korea
- Education in Korea
