= Tokyo University of Agriculture Botanical Garden =

Botanical garden in Kanagawa, Japan

Coordinates: 35.432394°N 139.344155°E

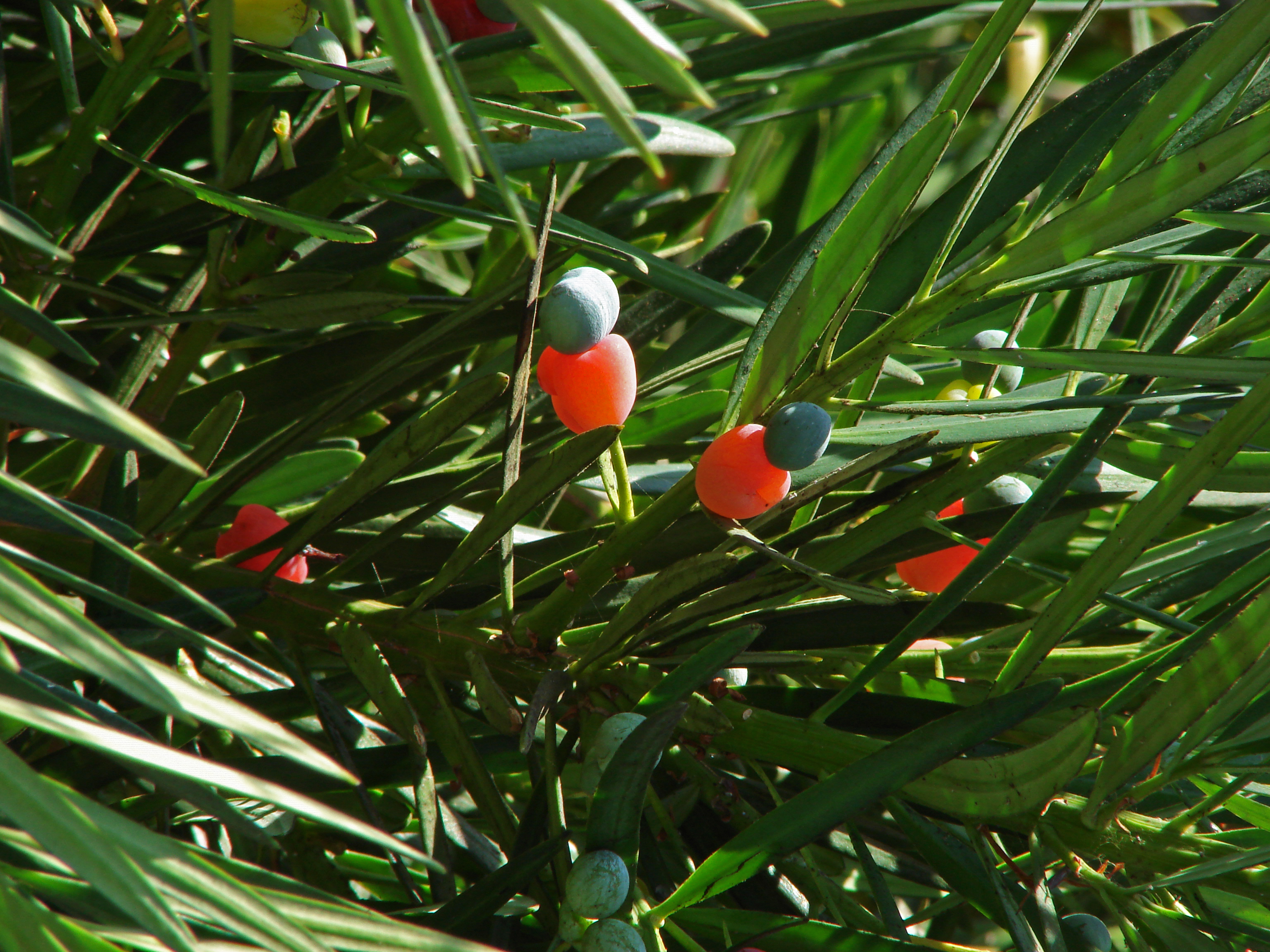
- Podocarpus at Tokyo University of Agriculture Botanical Garden
- Interactive map of Tokyo University of Agriculture Botanical Garden
- Type: Botanical garden
- Location: 1737 Funako, Atsugi, Kanagawa, Japan
- Area: 173,000 m^{2} (1,860,000 ft^{2})
- Created: 1967
- Operator: Tokyo University of Agriculture

The Tokyo University of Agriculture Botanical Garden (東京農業大学植物園, Tōkyō Nōgyō Daigaku Shokubutsuen) is a botanical garden located on the Atsugi, Kanagawa campus of the Tokyo University of Agriculture.

The garden was established in 1967, and now cultivates about 1,500 species of useful plants, including collections of Cactaceae and other succulents (such as Agave, Euphorbia, Kalanchoe, Stapelia, Sansevieria), Iris, Lilium, Paeonia, Rosa, Syringa, as well as flora of Asia and the Far East, Kazakhstan, Europe, the Americas, and medicinal plants and conifers, such as Podocarpus. In addition, 310 species of wild plants grow in the garden.

== See also ==
- List of botanical gardens in Japan
