= Lobos Marinos ITLP football =

- First season: 2013
- Last season: 2015
- Location: La Paz, Baja California Sur
- Stadium: Estadio Municipal
- Conference: Liga Premier CONADEIP
- Division: Grupo Libertad
- All-time record: 8–15 (.348)

The Lobos Marinos ITLP football team was the American football team that represented the Instituto Tecnológico de La Paz (ITLP or Tec La Paz) located in La Paz, Baja California Sur. The team competed in the Liga Premier CONADEIP, a college football league which broke away from ONEFA, as members of the second-tier Grupo Libertad.

The Lobos Marinos ITLP were officially admitted into CONADEIP at the IV General Assembly in late January 2013 and placed in the Grupo Libertad, becoming the first college football team from the state of Baja California Sur. The team played three seasons in CONADEIP from 2013 to 2015 and compiled an all-time record of eight wins and 15 losses (8–15) before the program was discontinued in January 2016.

The team colors were blue and vermillion.

== 2013 ==
2013 Lobos Marinos ITLP football
- Conference: Liga Premier CONADEIP
- Grupo Libertad
- Record: 1–6 (1–6 Libertad)
- Head coach: Guillermo Ortalejo (1st season)
- Defensive coordinator: Jorge Razura
- Home stadium: Estadio Municipal

The 2013 Lobos Marinos ITLP football team represented the Instituto Tecnológico de La Paz (ITLP or Tec La Paz) in the 2013 Liga Premier CONADEIP season. The Lobos Marinos competed in the second-tier Grupo Libertad and played their home games at the Estadio Municipal in La Paz. In its inaugural season of intercollegiate football, the team was led by head coach Guillermo Ortalejo.

The Lobos Marinos compiled a 1–6 record, finished seventh in the Grupo Libertad, and were outscored by a total of 236 to 133. The team was led on offense quarterback José Gracia, who earned CONADEIP Player of the Week honors in week 7 after throwing for 306 yards and a conference record-tying six touchdowns to lead ITLP to the first victory in program history against the Cimarrones UABC Mexicali.

=== Preseason ===
Date	Opponent	Site	Result	Source
31 August	Gatos Salvajes de La Paz	Estadio Municipal; La Paz	W 44–0	

=== Schedule ===
The Lobos Marinos' 2013 schedule consisted of three home games and four away games in the regular season.

Date	Opponent	Site	Result	Source
14 September	at Osos CETYS Tijuana	Estadio Margarita de Astiazarán de Fimbres; Tijuana	L 20–33	
21 September	Potros ITSON	Estadio Municipal; La Paz	L 0–50	
28 September	at Búhos UNISON	Estadio Miguel Castro Servín; Hermosillo	L 7–28	
5 October	Zorros CETYS Mexicali	Estadio Municipal; La Paz	L 35–39	
12 October	at Cimarrones UABC Ensenada	Unidad Deportiva Valle Dorado; Ensenada	L 8–28	
19 October	Cimarrones UABC Mexicali	Estadio Municipal; La Paz	W 63–0	
26 October	at Cimarrones UABC Tijuana	Estadio Cimarrón; Tijuana	L 0–58	

== 2014 ==
2014 Lobos Marinos ITLP football

Grupo Libertad semifinal, L 21–47 at Potros ITSON
- Conference: Liga Premier CONADEIP
- Grupo Libertad
- Record: 5–3 (5–2 Libertad)
- Head coach: Guillermo Ortalejo (2nd season)
- Defensive coordinator: Jorge Razura
- Captain: Luis Meza
- Home stadium: Estadio Municipal

The 2014 Lobos Marinos ITLP football team represented the Instituto Tecnológico de La Paz (ITLP or Tec La Paz) in the 2014 Liga Premier CONADEIP season. The Lobos Marinos competed in the second-tier Grupo Libertad and played their home games at the Estadio Municipal in La Paz. The team was led by second-year head coach Guillermo Ortalejo.

In their second year of play, the Lobos Marinos finished the regular season with a 5–2 record, finishing in a four-way tie for first place in the Grupo Libertad. Seeded fourth in the Grupo Libertad playoffs due to point differential tiebreaker rules, they lost to the Potros ITSON in the semifinal.

The team was led on offense quarterback José Gracia and running back Carlos "Cuba" González, while safety Luis Meza served as team captain. González earned CONADEIP Player of the Week honors after rushing for 142 yards and two touchdowns on 15 carries against the Cimarrones UABC Tijuana in week 7. González led the league with 836 rushing yards.

=== Schedule ===
The Lobos Marinos' 2014 schedule consisted of four home games and three away games in the regular season.

Date	Opponent	Site	Result	Source
30 August	at Potros ITSON	Campo Hundido; Ciudad Obregón	L 0–32	
6 September	Búhos UNISON	Estadio Municipal; La Paz	W 13–12	
13 September	at Zorros CETYS Mexicali	Campo CETYS; Mexicali	L 24–26	
27 September	at Cimarrones UABC Mexicali	Campo APAM; Mexicali	W 30–14	
4 October	Cimarrones UABC Tijuana	Estadio Municipal; La Paz	W 21–14	
11 October	Osos CETYS Tijuana	Estadio Municipal; La Paz	W 36–21	
18 October^{[a]}	Cimarrones UABC Ensenada	Estadio Municipal; La Paz	W 34–14	
25 August	at Potros ITSON	Campo Hundido; Ciudad Obregón (Grupo Libertad semifinal)	L 21–47	

^{^[a]}The game between the Lobos Marinos ITLP and Cimarrones UABC Ensenada was originally scheduled to take place on 20 September. However, in light of Hurricane Odile, the game was rescheduled to 18 October.

=== Personnel ===
2014 Lobos Marinos ITLP football team roster
Players
Coaches
Offense

Pos.	#	Name	Class
RB/DB	3	Jaime Alberto Rivas Chiquete	Fr
WR	11	Martín Alberto Gómez Ortega	So
WR	14	Cristo Alejandro Espinoza Espinoza	Fr
QB/WR	16	Ernesto de Jesús Vivian Manríquez	So
WR/DB	17	Pedro Murillo Sández	So
WR/DB	18	Jorge Apodaca Mercado	So
WR/DB	24	Ozneir Ulises Castruita García	Fr
WR/DL	26	Héctor Alonso Santiago García	Fr
RB/WR	27	Rodolfo Gabriel Cortés Silva	So
RB/DB	32	Carlos Yaszir González Martínez	So
OL/DE	51	Luis Omar Cebrero Carrasco	So
OL/DL	55	José Humberto García Luna	So
OL/DL	56	Rodrigo Alejandro Ruíz Toledo	So
OL/DL	58	Luis Alberto Pérez Gálvez	So
OL/TE	69	Efrén Ernesto Espinoza Jaime	So
OL/DL	77	Christian Alán Martínez Rieke	So
OL/DL	78	Andrés Fiol Manríquez	So
OL/DE	90	Praxedes Ruíz Romero	So

Defense

Pos.	#	Name	Class
LB/DB	7	Ignacio Carballo Cota	So
DB	12	Eddie Josué Nicolás de la Cruz	Fr
DL/DB	15	Juan Carlos Díaz León	Fr
LB/DB	21	Marco Antonio Espinoza Flores	Fr
DB/LB	22	Ricardo Estrada Alemán	So
WR/DB	23	Eduardo Bocanegra Tenorio	So
DB	25	Jesús Edwin Clavel Meza	So
DB	28	Luis Alejandro Luévano Gámez	Fr
DB/LB	43	Luis Ricardo Meza Talamantes (C)	So
DB/LB	45	Dante Gregorio Sandoval Arce	So
LB/DL	45	Carlos Hernán Cortéz Barrera	Fr
DL/DE	46	Armando Contreras Rodríguez	So
LB/DB	47	Alfonso Tirado García	So
DE/DB	49	Francisco Ikzáin Olachea Balleza	Fr
DL/OL	51	Luis Fernando Nieblas Sánchez de la Vega	Fr
LB/DE	52	Luis Alberto Real González	So
LB/DE	53	Luis Ángel de Jesús Soriano Quezada	So
DL/OL	62	Javier Adrián Cruz Moreno	Fr
DE/DL	92	Luis Alfonso Orduño Gerardo	So
DL/DE	96	Eduardo Miranda Tafoya	So
DL/DE	99	Helios Cota Famanía	So

Special teams

Pos.	#	Name	Class

Head coach

- Guillermo Ortaleja

Coordinators/assistant coaches

- Jorge Jiménez Razura – Defensive coordinator
- Carlos González Valero – Assistant coach
- José Guillermo Espinoza Gámez – Special teams coach

Legend

- (C) Team captain
- (S) Suspended
- (I) Ineligible
- Injured
- Redshirt

Roster
Last update: 15 August 2025

== 2015 ==
2015 Lobos Marinos ITLP football
- Conference: Liga Premier CONADEIP
- Grupo Libertad
- Record: 2–6 (2–6 Libertad)
- Head coach: Guillermo Ortalejo (3rd season)
- Captains: Jorge Apodaca; Luis Meza
- Home stadium: Estadio Municipal

The 2015 Lobos Marinos ITLP football team represented the Instituto Tecnológico de La Paz (ITLP or Tec La Paz) in the 2015 Liga Premier CONADEIP season. The Lobos Marinos competed in the second-tier Grupo Libertad and played their home games at the Estadio Municipal in La Paz. The team was led by third-year head coach Guillermo Ortalejo.

The Lobos Marinos compiled a 2–6 record, tying for seventh place in the Grupo Libertad, and were outscored by a total of 208 to 148. The team was led on offense by quarterbacks Cristhian Carbajal and Ernesto Vivian and running back Carlos "Cuba" González, while wide receiver Jorge Apodaca and safety Luis Meza served team captains. Meza led the league with 64 tackles and was selected to the Stars Bowl for the second year in a row.

=== Schedule ===
The Lobos Marinos' 2015 schedule consisted of four home games and four away games in the regular season.

Date	Opponent	Site	Result	Source
29 August	Cimarrones UABC Mexicali	Estadio Municipal; La Paz	W 52–0	
5 September	at Búhos UNISON	Estadio Miguel Castro Servín; Hermosillo	L 18–19	
12 September	Coyotes UTH	Estadio Municipal; La Paz	L 9–14	
19 September	at Osos CETYS Tijuana	Estadio Margarita de Astiazarán de Fimbres; Tijuana	L 12–33	
2 October	at Cimarrones UABC Tijuana	Campo UABC Tijuana; Tijuana	L 12–44	
10 October	Zorros CETYS Mexicali	Estadio Municipal; La Paz	L 0–55	
17 October	at Cimarrones UABC Ensenada	Unidad Deportiva Valle Dorado; Ensenada	W 20–14	
24 October	Potros ITSON	Estadio Municipal; La Paz	L 25–29	

=== Personnel ===
2015 Lobos Marinos ITLP football team roster
Players
Coaches
Offense

Pos.	#	Name	Class
RB/WR	3	Jaime Alberto Rivas Chiquete	So
WR/RB	4	Carlos Axel Duarte Zepeda	So
QB/WR	9	Robert Edwart Cole Freer	Fr
WR/DB	10	Rigoberto Rochín de los Santos	So
WR/DB	12	Federico Ramírez Manjarréz	So
QB/WR	13	José Andrés Gracia de la Toba	Jr
WR/RB	16	Ernesto de Jesús Vivian Manríquez	Jr
WR/DB	18	Jorge Apodaca Mercado (C)	Jr
QB/WR	19	Cristhian Ulises Carbajal Zazueta	Jr
WR/DB	23	Eduardo Bocanegra Tenorio	Jr
RB/WR	30	Edwin Salvador López de los Santos	Fr
RB/DB	32	Carlos Yaszir González Martínez	Jr
OL/DL	52	Armando Contreras Rodríguez	Jr
OL	54	Luis Carlos Rodríguez Astrid	So
OL/DL	55	José Humberto García Luna	Jr
OL/DL	58	Luis Alfonso Orduño Gerardo	Jr
OL/TE	69	Efrén Ernesto Espinoza Jaime	Jr
OL	72	Diego Alfredo Nogueda Medina	Fr
OL/DL	78	Jonathan Alfonso Núñez de la Rosa	Fr
WR/DB	81	José Alfredo Camacho Fausto	Fr
WR/RB	87	Kevin Geovanny Beltrán Castro	Fr

Defense

Pos.	#	Name	Class
LB/DL	2	Carlos Hernán Cortéz Barrera	So
DL/OL	11	Raúl Alfredo Ledesma Romero	Jr
DB	21	Armando Hassiel Juárez Cuevas	Fr
DB/LB	22	Ricardo Estrada Alemán	Jr
DB/LB	24	Ozneir Ulises Castruita García	So
DB	25	Jesús Edwin Clavel Meza	Jr
DE	26	Héctor Alonso Santiago García	So
DB	27	Isaac Levy Pacheco Ventura	Fr
DB	28	Luis Alejandro Luévano Gámez	So
DB	41	Cristian Emanuel Carrillo Vera	Fr
LB/DB	43	Luis Ricardo Meza Talamantes (C)	Jr
DL/LB	44	Manuel Salvador Arellano Contreras	Fr
DB/LB	45	Dante Gregorio Sandoval Arce	Jr
LB/DB	47	Alfonso Tirado García	Jr
DL/DE	51	Luis Omar Cebrero Carrasco	So
LB/DE	56	Luis Alberto Real González	Jr
DL/OL	59	Luis Fernando Nieblas Sánchez de la Vega	So
DL/OL	62	Javier Adrián Cruz Moreno	So
DL/OL	65	Arturo Candia Sabino	Fr

Special teams

Pos.	#	Name	Class

Head coach

- Guillermo Ortalejo

Coordinators/assistant coaches

- Jorge Jiménez Razura – Defensive coordinator
- Rubén Meza Talamantes – Defensive coordinator & defensive backs coach
- Ricardo Amador Sánchez – Running backs coach
- José Guillermo Espinoza Gámez – Special teams coach

Legend

- (C) Team captain
- (S) Suspended
- (I) Ineligible
- Injured
- Redshirt

Roster
Last update: 15 August 2025

== Demise and aftermath ==
In January 2016, the ITLP announced that the Lobos Marinos football team would not be returning for the 2016 season, ending its affiliation both with CONADEIP and the OEFA after three seasons of play. As the first college football team from Baja California Sur, the team travelled approximately 27,500 km (17,100 mi) during this time, with the players and their families contributing much of the funds.

Star running back Carlos "Cuba" González transferred to the Zorros CETYS Mexicali. He was named the 2016 Liga Premier CONADEIP MVP and selected to represent Mexico in the 2016 Stars Bowl held in Mexicali. González finished his career in 2018 as the CONADEIP all-time leader in rushing yards after recording 3,423 rushing yards and 42 touchdowns in 43 games.
