= Kogakuin Crash Machines football =

2016 Kogakuin Crash Machines football team
- First season: 1976; 50 years ago
- Location: Shinjuku, Tokyo, Japan
- Conference: Kantoh Collegiate American Football Association
- Division: Division 3
- Colors: Black, Silver, and Blue
- Website: Crash Machines football

The Kogakuin Crash Machines football program represents the Kogakuin University in college football. They are members of the Kantoh Collegiate American Football Association.
