= Ryukyus Stingrays football =

2017 Ryukyus Stingrays football team
- First season: 1987
- Location: Nishihara, Okinawa, Japan
- Conference: Kyūshū Collegiate American Football Association
- Division: Division 1
- Website: Ryukyus Stingrays football

The Ryukyus Stingrays football program represents University of the Ryukyus in college football. Ryukyus is a member of the Kyūshū Collegiate American Football Association.
