= Azuma Bowl =

Annual Japanese college football game

- あずまボウル
- Sport: Football
- Conference: Kantoh Collegiate American Football Association
- Played: 1970–2013
- Current champion: Nihon

The Azuma Bowl (あずまボウル) was an annual college football bowl game played in Japan to determine the winner of the Kantoh Collegiate American Football Association. It was discontinued after 2013, in favor of a new division format.
