= Aoyama Gakuin Lightning football =

2020 Aoyama Gakuin Lightning football team
- Location: Shibuya, Tokyo, Japan
- Conference: Kantoh Collegiate American Football Association
- Division: Division 2
- Colors: Green and White
- Website: Lighting football

The Aoyama Gakuin Lightning football program represents the Aoyama Gakuin University in college football. They are members of the Kantoh Collegiate American Football Association.
