= Pine Bowl (game) =

- パインボウル
- Operated: 1986–present
- Conference tie-ins: Hokkaido American Football Association, Tohoku Collegiate American Football Association

The Pine Bowl (パインボウル) is an annual college football bowl game played in Japan. The game features the champions of the Hokkaido American Football Association and the Tohoku Collegiate American Football Association. The winner claims the title of North Japan champions and goes on to play the Kanto League champion in the East Japan Championship.

== Game results ==
Season	Hokkaido League Representative		Tohoku League Representative		Site
1986	Hokkaido	6	Tohoku	30	大井球技場 • Tokyo
1987	Hokkaido	14	Tohoku	7	
1988	Hokkaido	14	Tohoku	14	
1989	Hokkaido	17	Tohoku	34	
1990	Hokkaido	10	Tohoku	24	Miyagi Athletic Stadium
1991	Sapporo Gakuin	7	Tohoku	19	Sapporo Atsubetsu Stadium
1992	Sapporo Gakuin	7	Tohoku	14	Miyagi Athletic Stadium
1993	Sapporo Gakuin	35	Tohoku	21	Sapporo Atsubetsu Stadium
1994	Sapporo	0	Tohoku	36	Miyagi Athletic Stadium
1995	Hokkaido	28	Tohoku	35	Sapporo Atsubetsu Stadium
1996	Hokkaido	45	Sendai	10	Miyagi Athletic Stadium
1997	Hokkaido	45	Tohoku	13	Sapporo Atsubetsu Stadium
1998	Hokkaido	31	Tohoku	30	Sendai Stadium
1999	Hokkaido	56	Iwate	3	Sapporo Atsubetsu Stadium
2000	Hokkaido	21	Tohoku	24	Sendai Stadium
2001	Hokkaido	10	Tohoku	28	Sapporo Dome
2002	Hokkaido	49	Tohoku	28	Sendai Stadium
2003	Hokkai Gakuen	12	Tohoku	48	Sapporo Dome
2004	Hokkaido	3	Tohoku	50	Sendai Stadium
2005	Hokkaido	0	Tohoku	20	Sapporo Dome
2006	Hokkaido	16	Tohoku	14	Yurtec Stadium Sendai
2007	Hokkaido	34	Tohoku	0	Sapporo Dome
2008	Hokkaido	24	Tohoku	36	Yurtec Stadium Sendai
2009	No game played				
2010	No game played				
2011	Otaru	8	Sendai	31	Sapporo Dome• Sapporo
2012	Sapporo Gakuin	13	Tohoku	34	Yurtec Stadium Sendai• Sendai
2013	Hokkaido	16	Tohoku	20	Miyagi Velodrome
2014	Hokkaido	7	Tohoku	10	Miyaginohara Velodrome
2015	Hokkaido	0	Tohoku	17	Yurtec Stadium Sendai
2016	Hokkaido	22	Tohoku	29	Sapporo Dome
2017	Hokkaido	3	Tohoku	14	Sendai City Athletic Stadium
