= 2016 Ritsumeikan Panthers football team =

College football season

2016 Ritsumeikan Panthers football
- Conference: Kansai Collegiate American Football League
- Division 1
- Record: 1-0 (1-0 Kansai)
- Head coach: Akira Yonekura
- Co-offensive coordinator: Akira Yonekura
- Defensive coordinator: Yuji Ikegami
- Home stadium: Nishikyogoku Athletic Stadium

2016 Kansai Collegiate American Football League Division 1 football standings
	Conf.			Overall
Team	W		L	W		L
Ritsumeikan	3	–	0	3	–	0
Kwansei Gakuin	3	–	0	3	–	0
Kansai	3	–	0	3	–	0
Ryukoku	1	–	2	1	–	2
Konan	1	–	2	1	–	2
Kyoto	1	–	2	1	–	2
Doshisha	0	–	3	0	–	3
Kobe	0	–	3	0	–	3
As of October 3, 2016

The 2016 Ritsumeikan Panthers football team represented Ritsumeikan University in the Kansai Collegiate American Football League during the 2016 season. Ritsumeikan played their home games at Nishikyogoku Athletic Stadium in Kyoto, Japan.

== Schedule ==
=== Preseason ===
Date	Time	Opponent	Site	Result
April 29	2:30 pm	Doshisha*	Nagahama Dome; Shiga Prefecture	W 30-7
May 8	1:30 pm	at Waseda*	Amino Vital Field	W 17-9
May 15	2:00 pm	at Kyoto*	Kyoto University Faculty of Agriculture Ground; Kyoto	W 27-6
May 22	11:00 am	Tokai*	Quince Stadium	W 35-7
May 29	12:30 pm	Ryukoku*	BKC Greenfield	W 27-6
June 5	2:00 pm	at Panasonic Impulse*	Prince Stadium	L 14-40
June 12	4:00 pm	Meijo*	BKC Greenfield	W 26-20
June 19	4:00 pm	Nagoya*	BKC Greenfield	W 33-7
*Non-conference game; All times are in [[Japan Standard Time Time Zone|Japan Standard Time time]]

=== Regular season ===
Date	Time	Opponent	Site	Result
August 26	7:00 pm	Konan	Expo Flash Field; Suita, Osaka	W 49-3
September 10	3:00 pm	at Doshisha	Kyocera Dome; Nishi-ku, Osaka	W 41-13
September 24	3:00 pm	Kobe	Expo Flash Field; Suita, Osaka	W 66-0
October 8	6:00 pm	Ryukoku	Expo Flash Field; Suita, Osaka	W 48-0
October 22	3:00 pm	at Kyoto	Nishikyogoku Athletic Stadium; Kyoto	
November 5	1:00 pm	at Kansai	Nagai Stadium; Osaka	
November 20	2:30 pm	at Kwansei Gakuin	Osaka Expo '70 Stadium; Osaka	
All times are in [[Japan Standard Time Time Zone|Japan Standard Time time]]
