= Kushiro Public University of Economics =

Coordinates: 43.0185°N 144.3965°E

- 釧路公立大学
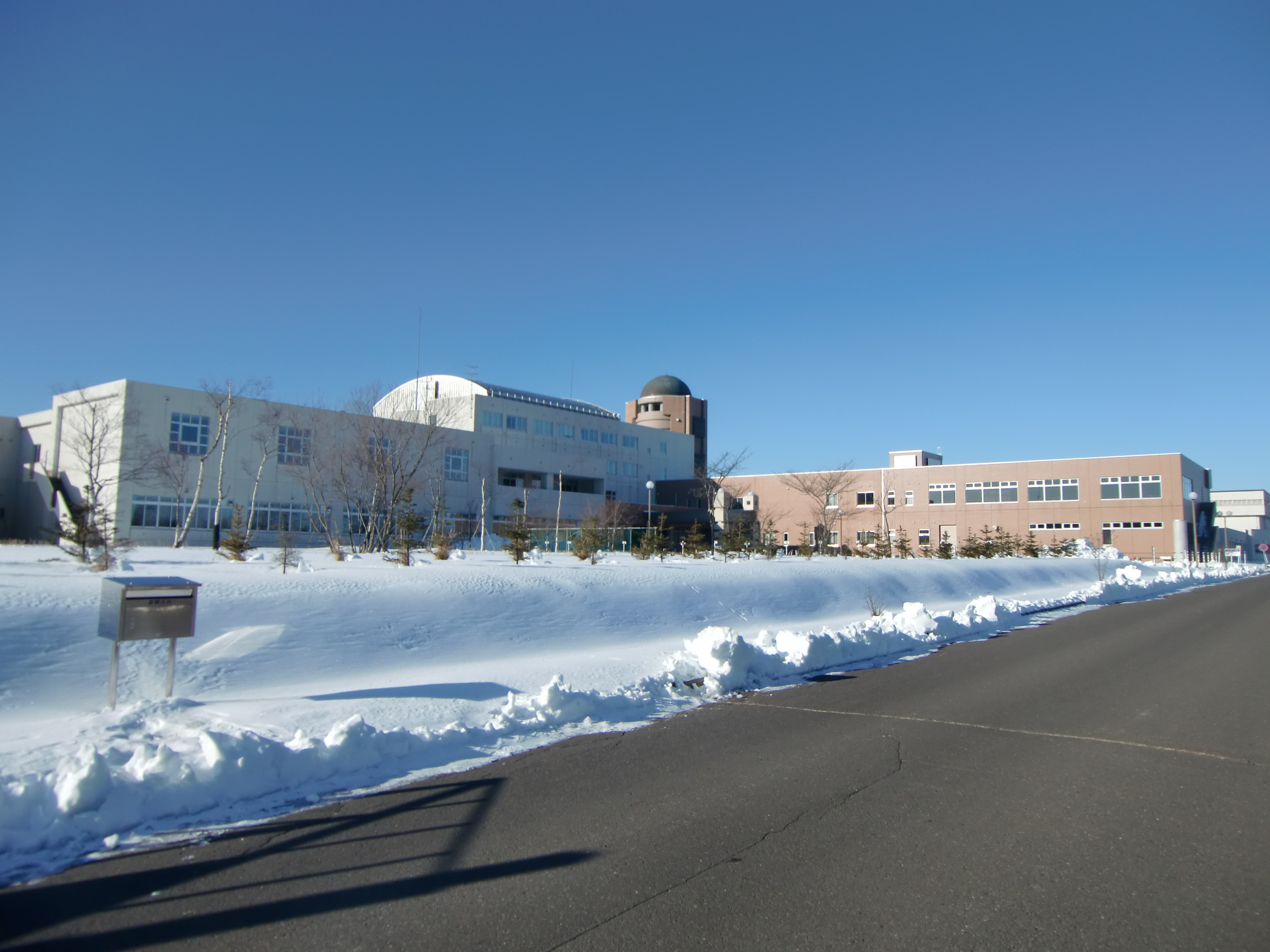
- Kushiro Public University of Economics campus
- Type: Public
- Established: 1988
- Location: Kushiro, Hokkaido, Hokkaidō, Japan
- Website: Official website

Kushiro Public University of Economics (釧路公立大学, Kushiro kouritsu daigaku) is a public university in Kushiro, Hokkaido, Japan. The school was established in 1988.
