= Kokushikan Rhinoceros football =

2016 Kokushikan Rhinoceros football team
- Location: Setagaya, Tokyo, Japan
- Conference: Kantoh Collegiate American Football Association
- Division: Big 8
- Colors: Crimson and Black
- Website: Kokushikan Rhinoceros American Football Team

The Kokushikan Rhinoceros football program represents the Kokushikan University in college football. They are members of the Big 8 in the Kantoh Collegiate American Football Association.
