= Chushikoku Collegiate American Football Association =

American college football league in Japan

- Region: Shikoku/Chūgoku
- Website: www.cscaa.jp

The Chushikoku Collegiate American Football Association (中四国学生アメリカンフットボール連盟) is an American college football league made up of colleges and universities primarily on the island of Shikoku; two schools are located in the Chūgoku region of Honshū.

== Overview ==
The Chushikoku Collegiate American Football Association is the highest level of collegiate football in the island of Shikoku.

== Member schools ==
=== Division 1 ===
Institution	日本語	Location	Founded	Type	Enrollment	Nickname	Colors
Hiroshima University	広島大学	Hiroshima, Hiroshima	1929	Public	11,332	Racoons	Black and white
Shimane University	島根大学	Matsue/Izumo, Shimane	1949	Public	6,130	Warriors	Red and White
Ehime University	愛媛大学	Matsuyama, Ehime	1949	Public	9,858	Bombers	Purple and gold
Kōchi University	高知大学	Kōchi, Kōchi	1949	National		Marine Corps	Green and White

=== Division 2 ===
Institution	日本語	Location	Founded	Type	Enrollment	Nickname	Colors
Matsuyama University	松山大学	Matsuyama, Ehime	1923	Private		Blue Arrows	Navy
Prefectural University of Hiroshima	県立広島大学	Hiroshima, Hiroshima	2005	Public		Knights	Navy
Tokyo University of Science, Yamaguchi	山口東京理科大学	San'yō-Onoda, Yamaguchi	1987	Public		Ball Pythons	Orange
Yamaguchi University	山口大学	Yamaguchi, Yamaguchi	1894	National	10,830	Gamblers	Blue and Yellow

== League Champions ==
Season	Champion	Conference record
2009	Ehime	4-0
2010	Hiroshima	4-0
2011	Hiroshima	1-2
2012	Ehime	3-0
2013	Ehime	2-1
2014	Hiroshima	2-1
2015	Hiroshima	3-0
2016	Shimane	3-0
2017	Shimane	3-0

== Heiwadai Bowl ==
The champion of the Chushikoku League plays in the Heiwadai Bowl against the champion of the Kyūshū Collegiate American Football Association in the West Japan playoff bracket.
