= Waseda Big Bears football =

2016 Waseda Big Bears football team
- First season: 1934
- Location: Shinjuku, Tokyo, Japan
- Conference: Kantoh Collegiate American Football Association
- Division: Top 8
- Colors: Maroon
- Website: Waseda Big Bears American Football Team

The Waseda Big Bears football program represents the Waseda University in college football. They are members of the Top 8 in the Kantoh Collegiate American Football Association.

Since 1983, the team has been nicknamed the "Big Bears", a play on the surname of Waseda University's founder, Ōkuma Shigenobu (大隈重信), as "Ōkuma" is a homophone of the Japanese word for "big bear" (大熊).
