= Stars Bowl =

The Stars Bowl (Spanish: Tazón de las Estrellas) is a collegiate American football post-season bowl game that is played annually in Mexico between the Mexican All-Star team from CONADEIP and the American NCAA Division III All-Star team called Team Stars & Stripes. The 2018 edition was cancelled.

== Game results ==
Bowl	Date	Winner	Loser	Result	Venue
I	December 19, 2009	Borregos Tec Stars	División III All Stars	24–12	Corral de Plástico
II	December 18, 2010	Division III All Stars	CONADEIP Stars	48–7	La Congeladora
III	December 17, 2011	CONADEIP Stars	Division III All Stars	45–27	Templo del Dolor
IV	December 15, 2012	Division III All Stars	CONADEIP Stars	32–15	Fortaleza Azul
V	December 21, 2013	Division III All Stars	CONADEIP Stars	29–7	Estadio Tecnológico
VI	December 20, 2014	CONADEIP Stars	Division III All Stars	31–17	Estadio Templo del Dolor
VII	December 19, 2015	Division III All Stars	CONADEIP Stars	15–14	CETYS Tijuana
VIII	December 17, 2016	CONADEIP Stars	Division III All Stars	51–26	CETYS Mexicali
IX	December 16, 2017	CONADEIP Stars	Division III All Stars	28–24	CETYS Tijuana
