= Tokyo University of Agriculture =

Private university in Japan

- 東京農業大学
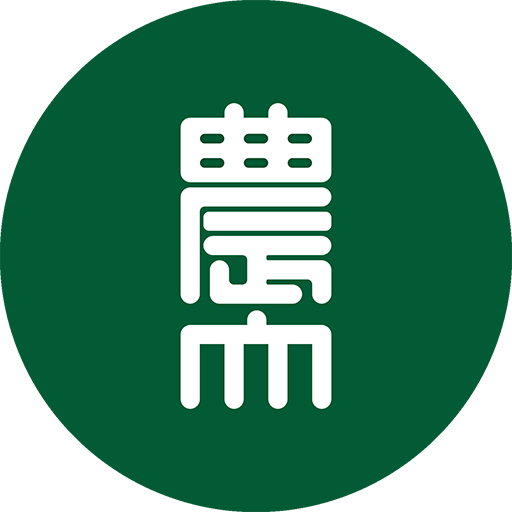
- Motto: From "Return Students to the Farm" to "Return Students to the World"
- Type: Private
- Established: 1891
- Founder: Enomoto Takeaki
- President: Fumio Eguchi
- Faculty: 321
- Students: 12,000
- Location: Setagaya, Tokyo Prefecture, Japan; 35°38′28″N 139°37′56″E
- Campus: Urban
- Website: https://www.nodai.ac.jp/english/
- Tokyo, Japan

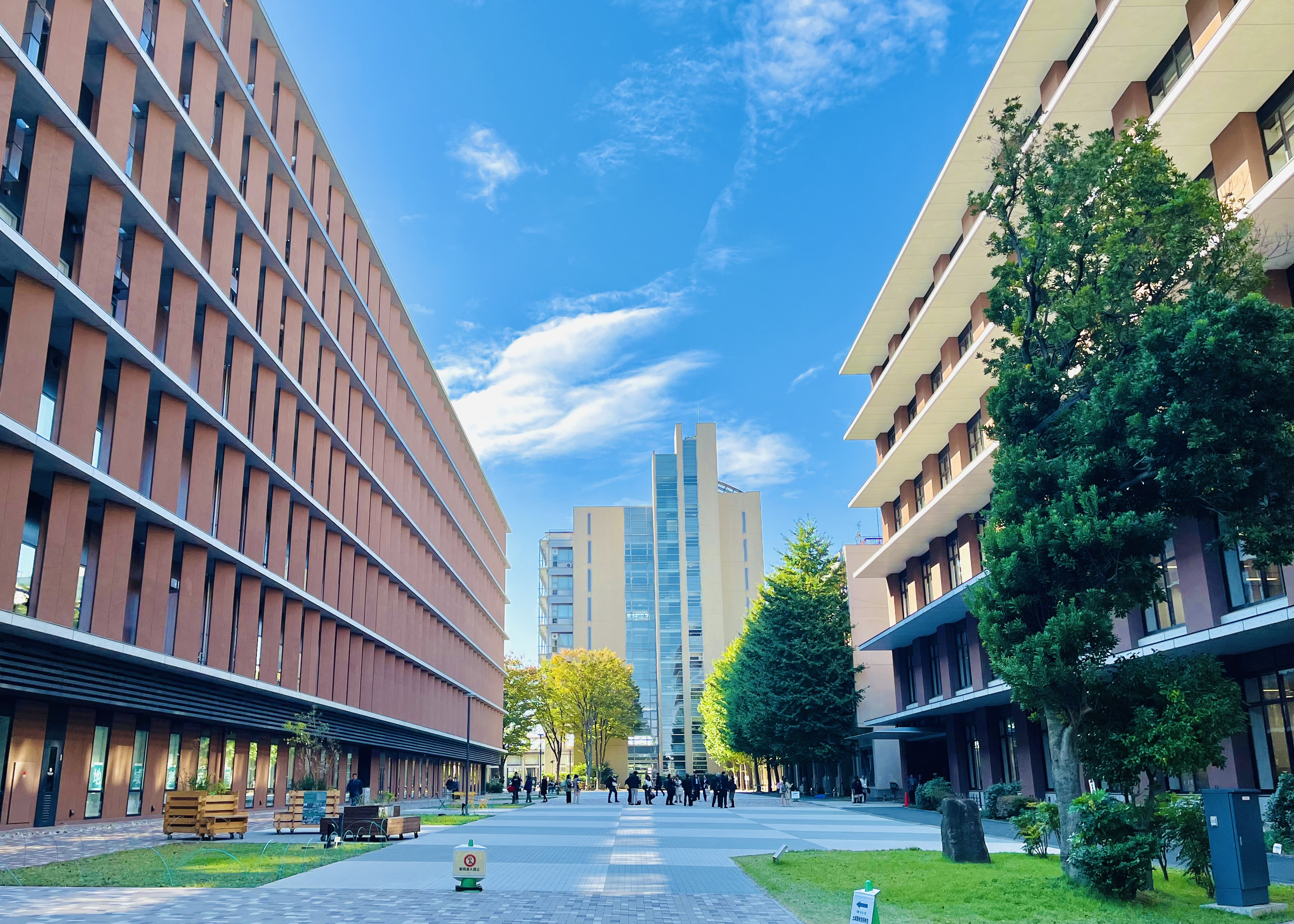
Tokyo University of Agriculture

The Tokyo University of Agriculture (東京農業大学, Tōkyō nōgyō daigaku) is a private university located in Tokyo, Japan. It has campuses in Setagaya, Atsugi, and Okhotsk (Abashiri). Its abbreviated name is Nodai (農大, nōdai) or Tokyo nodai (東京農大, Tōkyō nōdai).

Founded in 1891 as Japan's first private agricultural school and re-established as a university in 1925, it is the only comprehensive agricultural university in Japan that specializes in research in the fields of agriculture and biotechnology. Including public agriculture universities, Tokyo University of Agriculture is ranked third, behind Sapporo Agricultural College and the University of Tokyo, Komaba Campus.

== Outline ==
Tokyo University of Agriculture is a private agriculture university. It was the first such institution founded in Japan. As of 2006 it is the only private university in Japan that specializes in agriculture. Although its name is similar to Tokyo University of Agriculture and Technology and the College of Agriculture at University of Tokyo, the institutions are not related to one another.

This university handles Agriculture from a multifaceted approach with 6 faculties and 23 departments, and is characterized by the fact that most academic fields within the agricultural science system can be studied. Academic fields include agriculture in a broad sense (general term for agriculture, forestry and fisheries), life sciences (genetics, molecular biology, microbiology, etc.), and food-related fields (brewing science, food safety, nutrition, food science, etc.). Economics and Business Administration), and there are also departments such as brewing and landscaping that only exist at this university. At our university, they define these academic fields as Comprehensive Agriculture and conduct wide-ranging academic research in the field of agriculture.

== Faculties and graduate schools ==
University rankings
Global
THE	General	1500+
QS	General	401-475
ARWU	Research	901-1000

Regional
QS Asia (Asia version)	General	604

National

=== Undergraduate ===
- Faculty of Agriculture (Atsugi campus)
- Faculty of Applied Bio-Science
- Faculty of Life Sciences
- Faculty of Regional Environment Science
- Faculty of International Agriculture and Food Studies
- Faculty of Bio-Industry (Hokkaido-Okhotsk campus)

=== Graduate ===
- Graduate School of Agriculture (Atsugi campus)
- Graduate School of Applied Bio-Science
- Graduate School of Life Sciences
- Graduate School of Agro-Environmental Science
- Graduate School of International Food and Agricultural Studies
- Graduate School of Bio-Industry (Hokkaido-Okhotsk campus)

There is also a two-year junior college and teacher-training course at the main campus in Setagaya.

== See also ==
- Tokyo University of Agriculture Botanical Garden
