= Kyūshū Collegiate American Football Association =

- Region: Kyushu (including Okinawa)
- Official website: www.kcafa.jp/index.html

The Kyūshū Collegiate American Football Association (九州学生アメリカンフットボール連盟) is an American college football league made up of colleges and universities primarily on the island of Kyushu, Japan; one school is located on Okinawa Island.

== Overview ==
The champion of the Kyūshū League competes with the champions of the Tōkai League, the Chushikoku League, and the Hokuriku League for the right to face the Kansai League champion in the Flash Bowl for the West Japan championship.

== Member schools ==
=== Division 1 ===
Institution	日本語	Location	Founded	Type	Enrollment	Nickname	Colors
Seinan Gakuin University	西南学院大学	Fukuoka, Fukuoka	1916	Private	8,107	Green Dolphins	
Fukuoka University	福岡大学	Fukuoka, Fukuoka	1934	Private	663	Black Knights	
Kurume University	久留米大学	Kurume, Fukuoka	1946	Private		Mean Fighters	
Kyushu University	九州大学	Fukuoka, Fukuoka	1903	National	18,925	Palookas	
University of the Ryukyus	琉球大学	Nishihara, Okinawa	1950	National	8,098	Stingrays	
Fukuoka University of Education	福岡教育大学	Munakata, Fukuoka	1876	National		Lions	

=== Division 2 ===
==== League A ====
Institution	日本語	Location	Founded	Type	Enrollment	Nickname	Colors
Kagoshima University	鹿児島大学	Kagoshima, Kagoshima	1949	National	9,368	Bonito	
Kyushu Sangyo University	九州産業大学	Fukuoka, Fukuoka	1960	Private		Red Free Birds	
Kumamoto University	熊本大学	Kumamoto, Kumamoto	1925	National	10,154	Outlaws	

==== League B ====
Institution	日本語	Location	Founded	Type	Enrollment	Nickname	Colors
Saga University	佐賀大学	Saga, Saga	1920	National		Tomcats	
University of Miyazaki	宮崎大学	Miyazaki, Miyazaki	1884	National		Bacchus	
Kyushu Tech	九州工業大学	Kitakyushu/Iizuka, Fukuoka	1907	National		Wildgeese	
University of Nagasaki	長崎県立大学	Sasebo, Nagasaki	2008	Public		Marines	

== Division 1 League Champions ==
Season	Champion
1977	Fukuoka
1978	Fukuoka
1978	Fukuoka
1980	Fukuoka
1981	Kyushu
1982	Seinan Gakuin
1983	Seinan Gakuin
1984	Seinan Gakuin
1985	Kyushu
1986	Fukuoka
1987	Kyushu
1988	Seinan Gakuin
1989	Fukuoka
1990	Seinan Gakuin
1991	Seinan Gakuin
1992	Kyushu
1993	Fukuoka
1994	Seinan Gakuin
1995	Kyushu
1996	Fukuoka
1997	Seinan Gakuin
1998	Kyushu
1999	Kyushu
2000	Kyushu
2001	Kurume
2002	Kyushu
2003	Kurume
2004	Kurume
2005	Kyushu and Seinan Gakuin
2006	Kyushu
2007	Kyushu
2008	Fukuoka and Seinan Gakuin
2009	Kyushu
2010	Kurume and Seinan Gakuin
2011	Seinan Gakuin
2012	Seinan Gakuin
2013	Kyushu
2014	Seinan Gakuin
2015	Seinan Gakuin

== Heiwadai Bowl ==
The champion of the Kyūshū League plays in the Heiwadai Bowl against the champion of the Chushikoku Collegiate American Football Association in the West Japan playoff bracket.
