= Shimane University =

University in Shimane Prefecture, Japan

- 島根大学
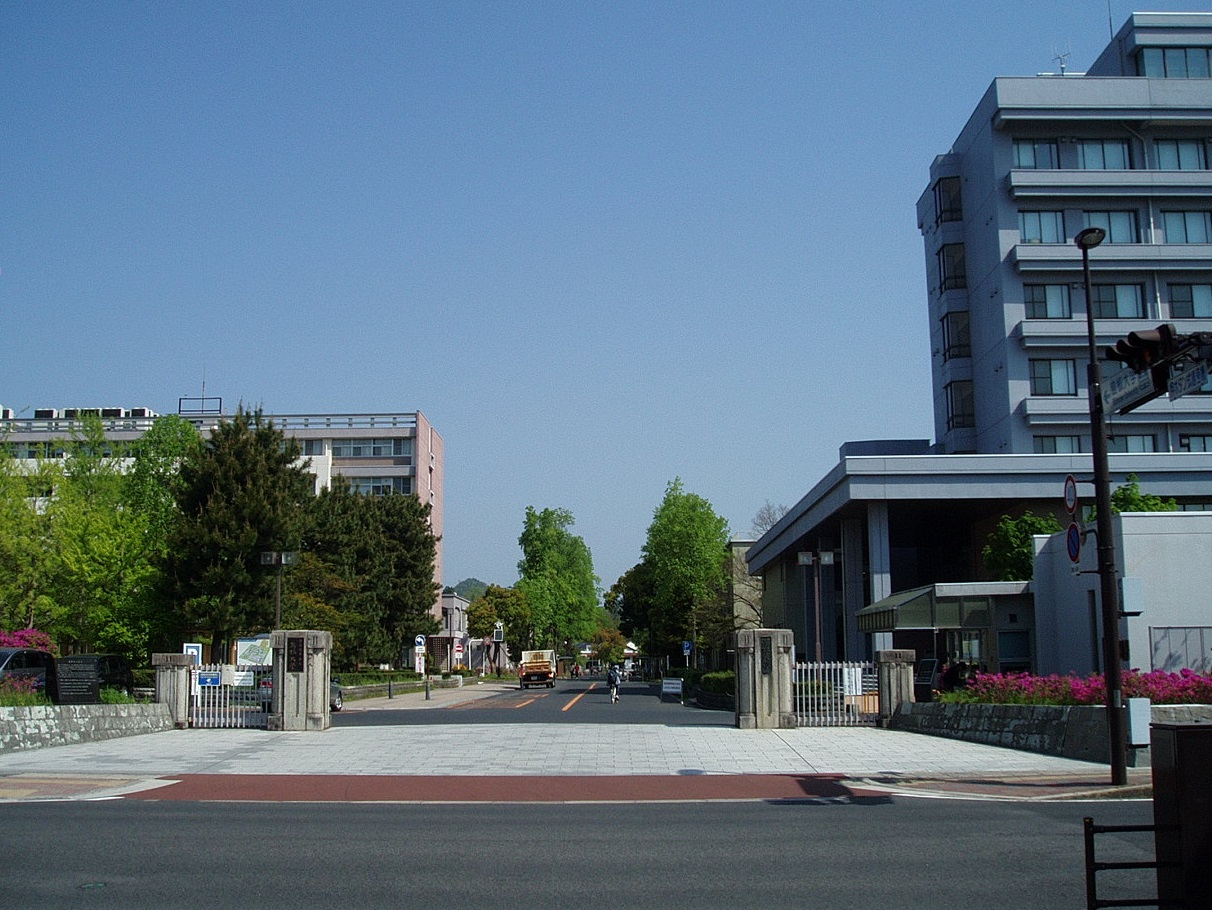
- Type: Public (National)
- Established: 1949
- President: Yasunao Hattori
- Students: 6,130
- Undergraduates: 5,399
- Postgraduates: 731
- Doctoral students: 183
- Location: 1060 Nishikawatsu-chō, Matsue and Izumo, Shimane Prefecture, 690-8504, Japan; 35.4848°N 133.0671°E
- Website: www.shimane-u.ac.jp

Shimane University (島根大学, Shimane Daigaku) — colloquially known as Shima-dai (島大) — is a national university in Japan. Although formally established as a university in 1949, Shima-dai's origins date back to the late 19th century. In 2003 it merged with the Shimane Medical University (established in 1975). It is a multi-disciplinary university, with faculties in law and literature, education, medicine, science and engineering, and life and environmental science. The university has graduate schools in humanities and social sciences, education, medical research, science and engineering, life and environmental science, and law. Shima-dai has approximately 6,000 students (including over 750 post-graduate and doctoral students), more than 750 academic staff and over 400 support staff. It was the first public university in Japan to establish an interdisciplinary department integrating natural sciences and engineering. The motto is 'Shimane University — growing with people and with the region' (人とともに 地域とともに 島根大学).

== Location/campuses ==
Located in Shimane Prefecture in western Honshu, the university has campuses in Matsue City (the prefectural capital) and Izumo City (one hour to the west of Matsue). The Matsue campus is home to the university's Law & Literature, Education, Science & Engineering, and Life & Environmental Science faculties, as well as the university's central administration. The Izumo campus is home to the university's Medical Faculty comprising the Medical School, Nursing School and University Hospital.

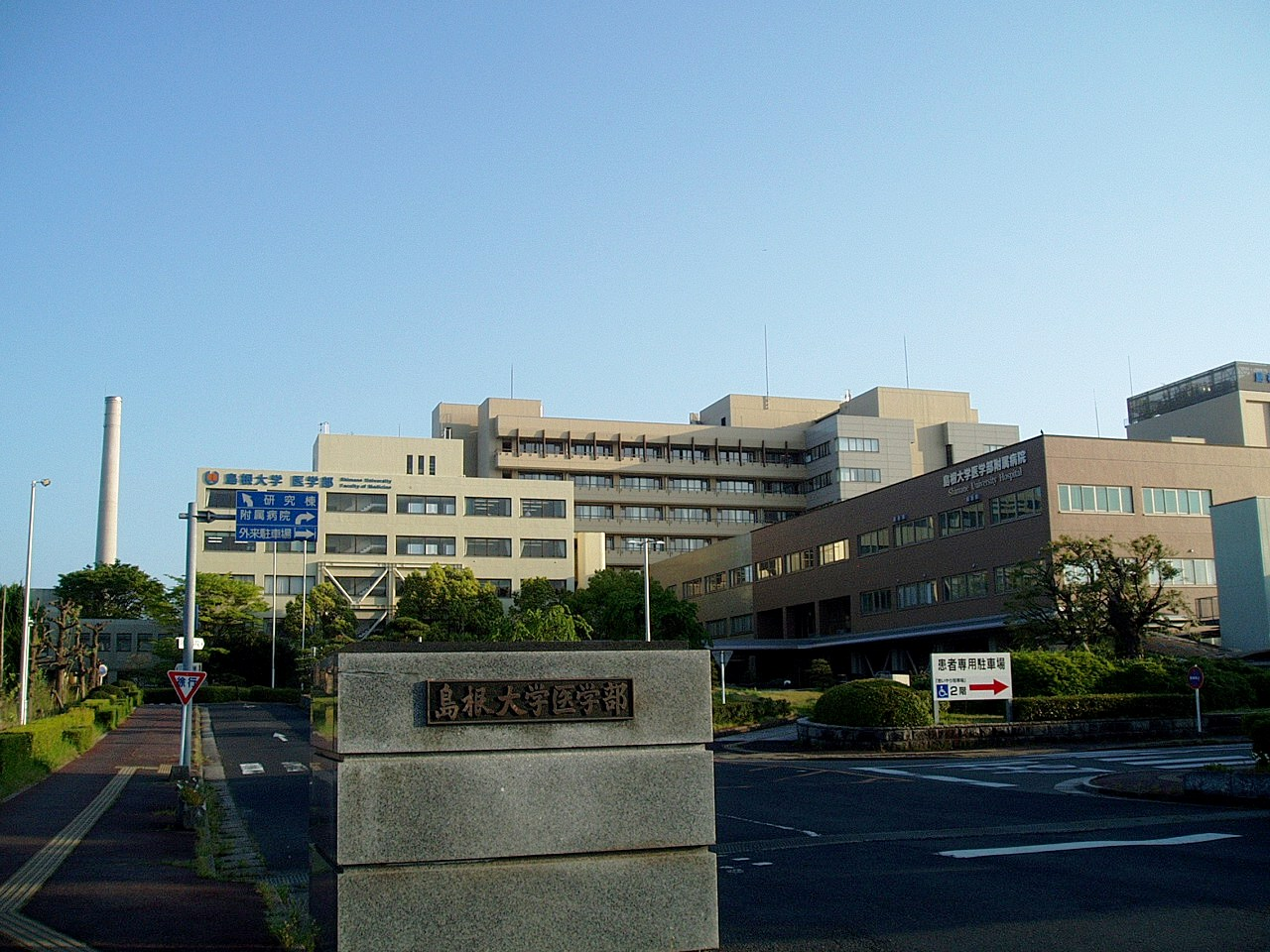
Main entrance to Izumo Campus (Medical School)

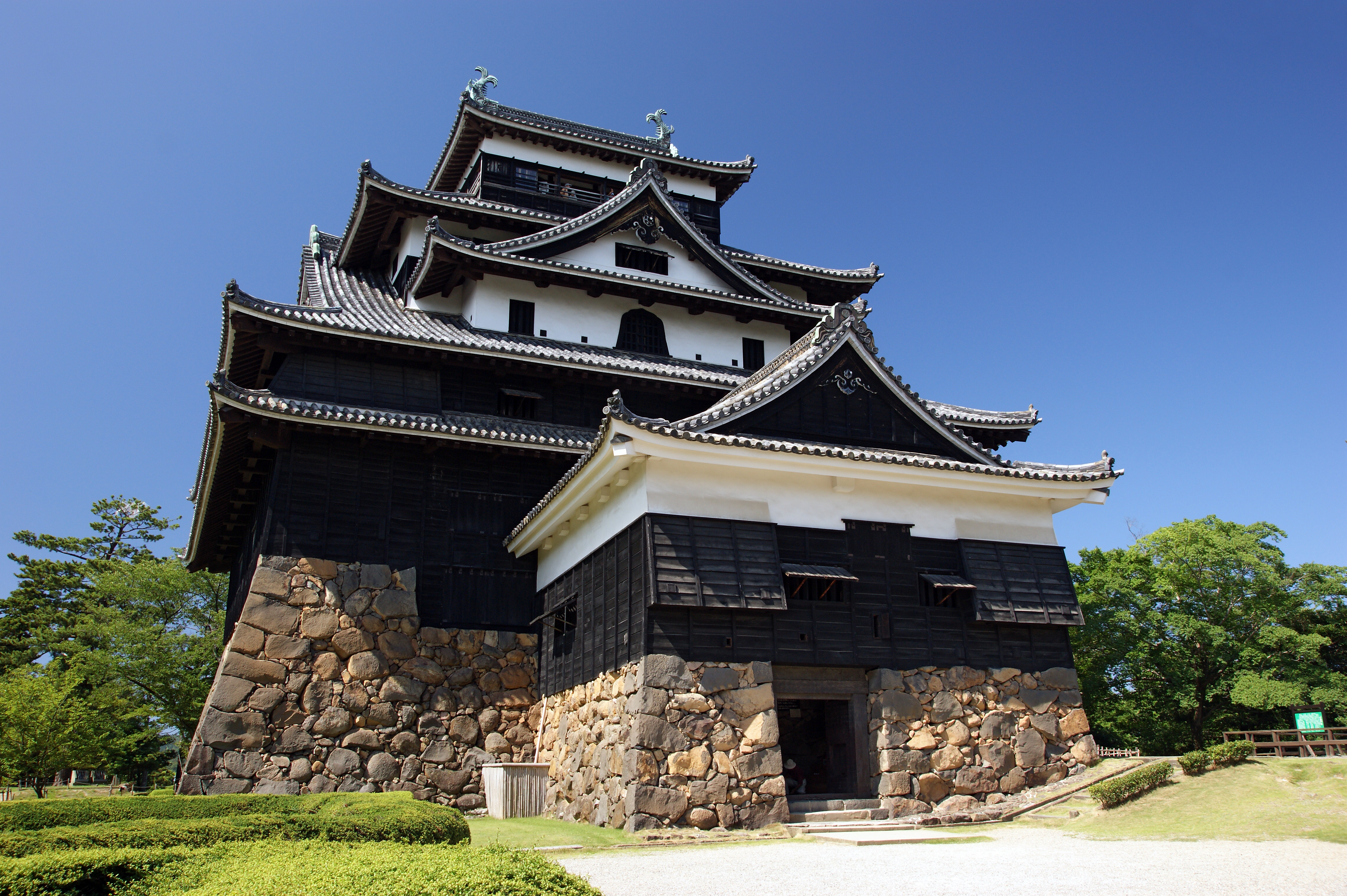
Matsue castle

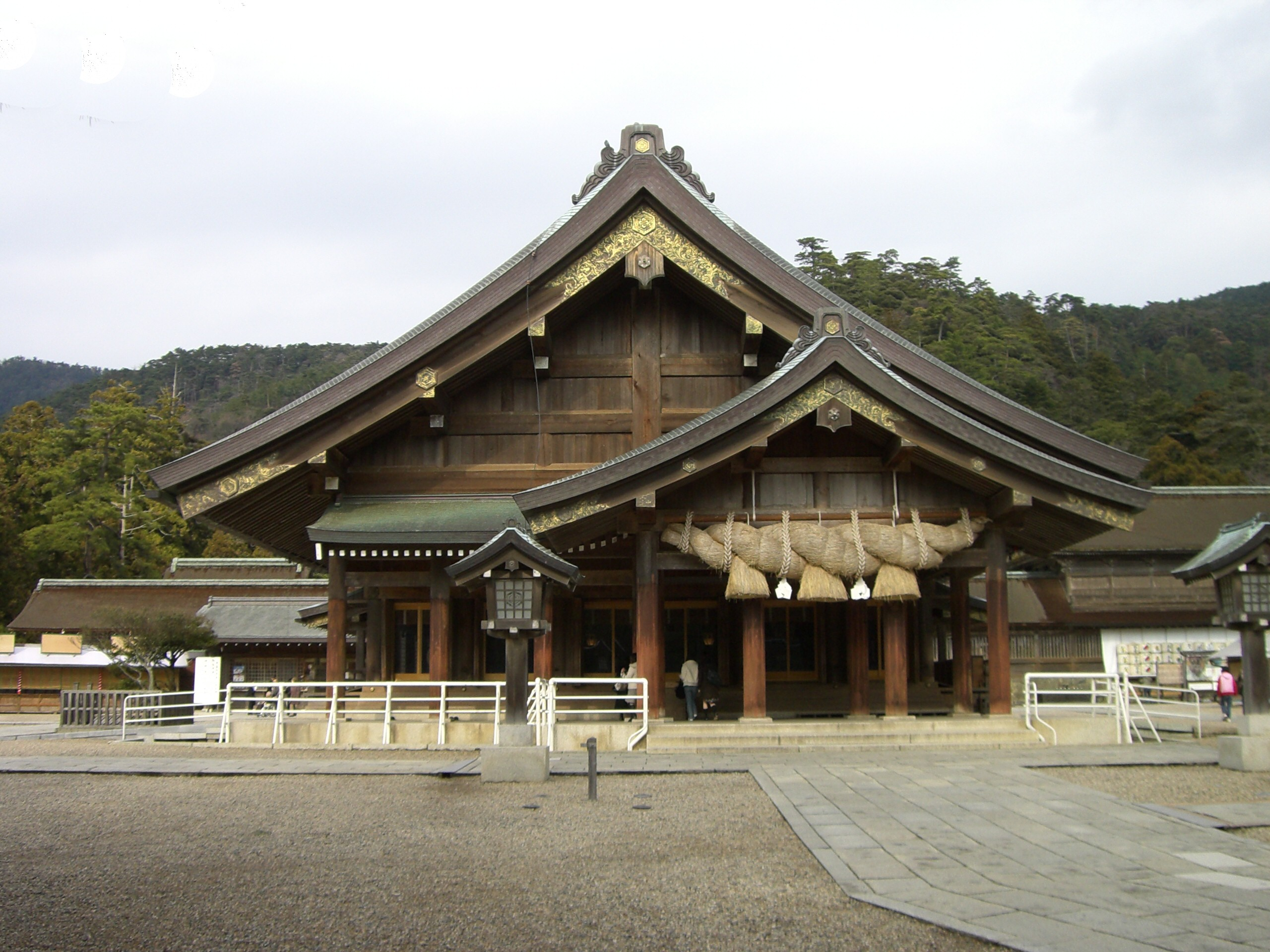
Izumo-shrine

== Academics ==
=== Faculties and departments ===
Shimane University comprises the following faculties, departments and schools:

- Faculty of Law & Literature - Department of Law & Economics; Department of Socio-cultural Studies, Department of Language and Culture
- Faculty of Education - School Teacher Training Course; affiliated kindergarten; affiliated elementary school; affiliated junior high school
- Faculty of Medicine - School of Medicine; School of Nursing; University Hospital
- Interdisciplinary Faculty of Science & Engineering - Department of Material Science; Department of Geoscience; Department of Information Systems Design and Data Science; Department of Electronic & Control Systems Engineering; Department of Natural Resources Process Engineering
- Faculty of Life & Environmental Science - Department of Biological Science; Department of Life Science & Biotechnology; Department of Agricultural & Forest Sciences; Department of Regional Environmental Sciences; Education & Research Center for Biological Resources

=== Graduate schools ===
Shimane University also has the following graduate schools:

- Graduate School of Humanities & Social Sciences
- Graduate School of Education
- Graduate School of Medical Research
- Interdisciplinary Graduate School of Science & Engineering
- Graduate School of Life & Environmental Science
- Graduate School of Law
- Graduate School of Natural Science & Technology

=== Courses and programs offered ===
==== Faculty of Law & Literature: Department of Law & Economics ====
Courses and programs of study offered by Shimane University include the following:

- Japanese and East Asian Languages and Cultures
- English and European Languages and Cultures
- Creation and Understanding of Culture
- Law and Politics
- Regional Economics
- Language and Culture
- Social-Cultural Studies

==== Faculty of Education ====
- Education (including Elementary School Education, Special Support Education, Clinical Psychology in School, Japanese and English Language Education, Social Studies Education, Mathematics Education, Science Education, Environmental Education, Health & Physical Education, Art & Music Education)
- MA in Pedagogical Development
- MA in Curriculum Development

==== Faculty of Medicine ====
- Medicine
- Nursing
- Master's courses in Medical Research, Oncology Pharmacy, Coordinator Course for Rural Medicine and Medical Simulation Instructor Course
- Doctorate in Medical Research
- Medical Oncology Training
- Medical Specialist Training

==== Interdisciplinary Faculty of Science & Engineering ====
- Physics
- Chemistry
- Geoscience
- Environmental Geology
- Natural Hazard Engineering
- Pure Mathematics
- Mathematical Analysis
- Applied Informatics
- Computer Science
- Control Systems Engineering
- Instrumentation Systems Engineering
- Electrical and Electronic Systems Engineering
- Electronic Devices Engineering
- Material Science
- Architecture
- Mechanical Engineering
- Graduate Course in Earth Science and Geo-environmental Science (special program from international students)
- Collaborative Educational Course in Science, Engineering and Medicine
- Doctorate in Materials Creation and Circulation Technology
- Doctorate in Electronic Functions and System Engineering

==== Faculty of Life & Environmental Science ====
- Agriculture
- Forestry
- Environmental Biology
- Rural Economics
- Ecology and Environmental Sciences
- Environmental Resources Engineering
- Rural Engineering
- Life Science and Biotechnology
- Biological Science
- Forest Science
- Agricultural Science
- Marine Biological Science
- Master's degree in Biological Science and Biotechnology
- Master's degree in Agriculture and Forest Science
- Master's degree in Environmental Science and Technology

==== Graduate School of Law ====
- Juris Doctor (prerequisite for Japanese Bar Examination)

=== Degrees offered ===
Shimane University offers undergraduate degrees, graduate degrees (including master's degrees and Doctorates) and specialist degrees such as the Graduate School of Law's Juris Doctor degree.

== Affiliated institutions ==
Shimane University incorporates or is affiliated with the following institutions (among others):

- Shimane University Hospital
- Shimane University Elementary School
- Shimane University Middle School
- San-in Region Research Center
- Center for Integrated Research in Science
- Research Center for Coastal Lagoon Environments
- International Joint Research Institute of Shimane University and Ningxia University (China)
- University Museum

=== Shimane University Hospital ===
The University Hospital, on the Izumo campus, was established in 1979 and extensively renovated in 2011. It is one of the largest hospitals — and the only teaching hospital — in Shimane Prefecture. The hospital covers all major specialties. It is home to Shimane Prefecture's Cancer Center and has a palliative care center, pediatric center and advanced ER, ICU and operating facilities. The hospital also specializes in rural medicine. It has nearly 1,168 medical and support staff and 606 beds.

== International programs ==
The university has an active and growing international program. Shima-dai has official ties with 38 universities around the world and each year hosts approximately 200 students from countries such as China, Bangladesh, Vietnam, Korea, Indonesia, Mongolia, Sri Lanka, Germany, France, the UK and the US.

=== United States ===
- Central Washington University, Washington, since 1982
- Kent State University Ohio, since 1982
- University of California, Davis, California, since 1986
- University of Arkansas Arkansas, since 1993
- University of Colorado, Denver, School of Medicine Colorado, since 2006
- University of Texas at Dallas, Texas, since 2007
- University of Florida, Department of Languages, Literatures and Cultures, College of Liberal Arts and Sciences Florida, since 2009
- The University of Arizona, Arizona, since 2010

=== Korea ===
- Yonsei University Seoul, since 1989
- Busan National University of Education Busan, since 1990
- Gyeongsang National University Jinju, since 1991
- Kyungpook National University Daegu, since 1991
- Seoul National University of Science & Technology Seoul, since 1998

=== China ===
- Northeast Forestry University, Heilongjiang, since 1989
- Nanjing Forestry University, Jiangsu, since 1993
- China Agricultural University, Beijing, since 1996
- Ningxia University, Ningxia, since 1997
- Beijing Forestry University, Beijing, since 1997
- Jilin University, Jilin, since 1999
- Hebei Normal University, Hebei, since 2002
- Dalian University, Liaoning, since 2003
- Ningxia Medical University, Ningxia, since 2004
- Beijing Normal University, Beijing, since 2004
- Renmin University of China, School of Economics Beijing, since 2005
- Shandong University Shandong, since 2005
- Zhejiang University, College of Education Zhejiang, since 2006

=== Mongolia ===
- Mongolian University of Science and Technology Ulaanbaatar, since 1999
- Health Sciences University of Mongolia Ulaanbaatar, since 2002

=== Vietnam ===
- Hanoi Medical University Hanoi, Vietnam, since 2005

=== Nepal ===
- Tribhuvan University Kathmandu, Nepal, since 1991

=== Indonesia ===
- Andalas University Padang, Indonesia, since 1997

=== Sweden ===
- Linkoping University Linkoping, Sweden, since 2005

=== Germany ===
- University of Trier Trier, Germany, since 2008

=== France ===
- Jean Moulin-Lyon 3 University Lyon, France, since 1990
- The University of Orleans Orleans, France, since 2002

=== Thailand ===
- King Mongkut's University of Technology Thonburi, School of Bioresources and Technology Bangkok, Thailand, since 2010
- Mahidol University, Faculty of Medicine Siriraj Hospital Bangkok, Thailand, since 2011

=== Bangladesh ===
- University of Dhaka Dhaka, Bangladesh, since 2011

== Facilities ==
Shimane University has the following facilities:

- Gymnasiums
- Martial arts budo-kan
- Athletics track
- Soccer & baseball fields
- Swimming pool
- Archery range
- Student Club Building
- Student Center
- Cooperative (including book shop and cafe)
- Information Technology Center
- Central library
- Health Center

== Alumni ==
The following individuals studied at Shimane University:

- Takashi Nagai, author of The bell of Nagasaki, 1908-1951
- Hajime Shinoda, literacy critic, 1927-1989
- Yasuji Hanamori, founding editor of Notebook of life (暮しの手帳), 1911-1978
- Den Fujita, founder of McDonald's Holdings Japan, 1926-2004

== Transport/access ==
Both the Matsue and Izumo campuses of Shimane University are easily accessible by rail, road and air. The Matsue campus is 2 kilometres from Matsue station (rail) and 30 minutes from Izumo and Yonago airports (which offer direct flights to Tokyo, Osaka and Seoul). The Izumo campus is a few minutes from Izumo station (rail) and 30 minutes to Izumo airport (direct flights to Tokyo and Osaka).

== Rankings ==
The university was ranked 61st (out of XX) in Japan by University Ranking by Academic performance in 2011. The Interdisciplinary faculty of Science and Engineering was ranked 1st in Japan by Shukan Asahi (週刊朝日進学Mook) 2012 concerning ratio of faculty member earned the Doctor degree of Science and Engineering.
