= Hiroshima Raccoons football =

2016 Hiroshima Raccoons football team
- First season: 1977
- Location: Hiroshima, Japan
- Conference: Chushikoku Collegiate American Football Association
- Division: Division 1
- Colors: Black and White
- Website: Hiroshima University Raccoons

The Hiroshima Raccoons football program, established in 1977, represents Hiroshima University in college football. Hiroshima is a member of the Chushikoku Collegiate American Football Association.
