= Tohoku Collegiate American Football Association =

Japanese league for American football

- No. of teams: 10
- Region: Tōhoku, Japan
- Website: www.tcaa.jp

The Tohoku Collegiate American Football Association (東北学生アメリカンフットボール連盟) is an American college football league made up of colleges and universities in northeastern part of Honshu, particularly the Tohoku region.

== Overview ==
The Tohoku Collegiate American Football Association is the highest level of collegiate football in northeastern Honshu.

== Member schools ==
=== Division 1 ===
Institution	日本語	Location	Founded	Type	Enrollment	Nickname	Colors
Tohoku Gakuin University	東北学院大学	Sendai, Miyagi	1886	Private	12,414	Kayaks	
Sendai University	仙台大学	Sendai, Miyagi	1879	Private		Silver Falcons	
Tohoku University	東北大学	Sendai, Miyagi	1907	Public	11,094	Hornets	
Iwate University	岩手大学	Morioka, Iwate	1949	National		Bisons	
Akita University	秋田大学	Akita, Akita	1949	National	5,000	Ogres	

=== Division 2 ===
Institution	日本語	Location	Founded	Type	Enrollment	Nickname	Colors
Hirosaki University	弘前大学	Aomori, Aomori	1949	Public	6,792	Starking	
Yamagata University	山形大学	Yamagata, Yamagata	1878	Public	9,748	Tomcats	
Tohoku Tech	東北工業大学	Sendai, Miyagi	1964	Private		Blue Raiders	
Nihon University (Engineering Department)	日本大学 (工学部)	Chiyoda, Tokyo	1889	Private	68,817	Crow Jeckles	
Kitasato University	北里大学	Minato, Tokyo		Private		Cowboys	

== Pine Bowl ==
The champion of the Tohoku League plays in the Pine Bowl against the champion of the Hokkaido League for the North Japan championship.
