= Sapporo Gakuin University =

University in Japan

- 札幌学院大学
- Motto: 自律 人権 共生 協働
- Motto in English: Self-discipline, Human rights, Environmental friendly, Co-operative
- Type: Private
- Established: Founded 1946
- Location: Ebetsu, Hokkaido, Japan; 43°04′00″N 141°29′39″E
- Campus: Suburban
- Website: www.sgu.ac.jp

Sapporo Gakuin University (札幌学院大学, Sapporo gakuin daigaku) is a private university in Ebetsu, Hokkaido, Japan. Its predecessor, a vocational school, was founded in 1946. It was chartered as a junior college in 1950. A four-year college (Sapporo College of Commerce, 札幌商科大学) opened in 1968; it adopted the name Sapporo Gakuin University in 1984. The junior college was closed in 1979.

== Faculties and departments ==
=== Undergraduate ===
- Faculty of Commerce (hiring freeze in 2009)
  - Department of Commerce
- Faculty of Business
  - Department of Business
  - Department of Accounting and Finance
- Faculty of Economics
  - Department of Economics
- Faculty of Humanities
  - Department of Human Science
  - Department of English Language and Literature
  - Department of Clinical Psychology
  - Department of Child Development
- Faculty of Law
  - Department of Law
- Faculty of Social Information
  - Department of Social Information

=== Graduate schools ===
- Graduate School of Law
- Graduate School of Clinical Psychology
- Graduate School of Regional Management
