= List of medical schools in Japan =

This is a list of medical schools located in Japan.

== Private medical colleges ==
- Aichi Medical University ja
- Dokkyo University School of Medicine ja
- Fukuoka University ja
- Fujita Health University ja
- Hyogo College of Medicine ja
- Iwate Medical University ja
- Jichi Medical School ja
- Jikei University School of Medicine ja
- Juntendo University ja
- Kawasaki Medical School ja
- Kanazawa Medical University ja
- Kansai Medical University ja
- Kitasato University ja
- Kyorin University ja
- Kinki University ja
- Kurume University ja
- Keio University ja
- Nihon University ja
- Nippon Medical School ja
- Osaka Medical College ja
- Saitama Medical School ja
- Showa University ja
- St. Marianna University School of Medicine ja
- Teikyo University ja
- Toho University ja
- Tokai University ja
- Tokyo Medical University ja
- Tokyo Women's Medical University ja
- University of Occupational and Environmental Health ja

== Public colleges ==
- Akita University ja
- Asahikawa Medical University ja
- Ehime University ja
- Oita University ja
- Osaka University ja
- Okayama University ja
- Kagawa University ja
- Kagoshima University ja
- Kanazawa University ja
- Gifu University ja
- Kyushu University ja
- Kyoto University ja
- Kumamoto University ja
- Gunma University ja
- Kochi University ja
- Kobe University ja
- Saga University ja
- Shiga University of Medical Science ja
- Shimane University ja
- Shinshu University ja
- National Defense Medical College ja
- Chiba University ja
- University of Tsukuba ja
- University of Tokyo ja
- Institute of Science Tokyo ja (former: Tokyo Medical and Dental University ja)
- Tohoku University ja
- University of Tokushima ja
- Tottori University ja
- University of Toyama ja
- Nagasaki University ja
- Nagoya University ja
- Niigata University ja
- Hamamatsu University School of Medicine ja
- Hirosaki University ja
- Hiroshima University ja
- Fukui University ja
- Hokkaido University ja
- Mie University ja
- University of Miyazaki ja
- Yamagata University ja
- Yamaguchi University ja
- University of Yamanashi ja
- University of the Ryukyus ja
- Sapporo Medical University ja
- Yokohama City University ja
- Nagoya City University ja
- Kyoto Prefectural University of Medicine ja
- Nara Medical University ja
- Fukushima Medical University ja
- Osaka City University ja
- Wakayama Medical University ja

== See also ==
- Medical school
- List of medical schools
