= Nagaoka Contemporary Art Museum =

The Nagaoka Contemporary Art Museum was a museum of art located in Nagaoka City, Niigata Prefecture, Japan. It is regarded as the first contemporary art museum in the country. Founded in 1964 by Jūkichi Komagata, it was established with the aim of actively assisting the development of gendai bijutsu (contemporary art) scene in Niigata and beyond. In addition to hosting an annual international art competition that highlighted the work and fostered the development of up-and-coming avant-garde artists, it also developed a rich and diverse contemporary art collection through both the fruits of these competitions and acquisition of works by established well-known artists. The Museum is particularly well-known for its connection to the artist collective Group Ultra Niigata (GUN), which developed in the lobby cafe of the Museum's building with the ultimately successful aspiration of showcasing their work there. The Museum closed in 1979 after being open for only fifteen years, but its legacy as one of Japan's earliest sites dedicated to contemporary art lives on to this day.

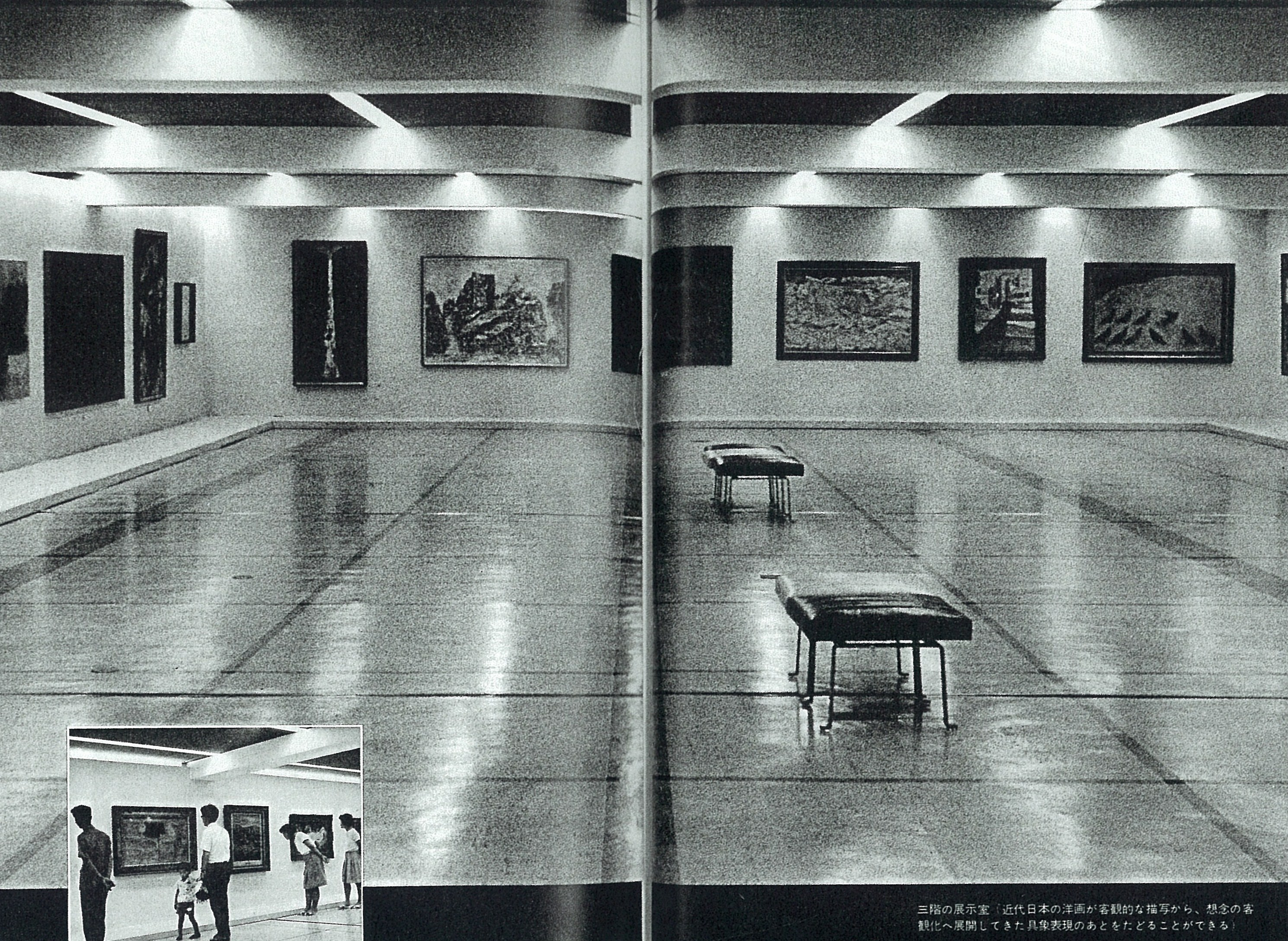
Nagaoka Contemporary Art Museum 3rd floor Exhibition Room, 1964

== History and Development ==
The Nagaoka Contemporary Art Museum was founded on 2 August 1964, by banker and private collector Jūkichi Komagata. A native of Fukuromachi in Nagaoka City, Komagata made his fortune as the founding manager of Hokuetsu Industrial Mujitsu (now Daiko Bank) and was deeply invested in the cultural development of his home city. He was particularly interested in yōga, and his large personal collection of yōga paintings (later called the Daiko Collection) became one of the foundations for Nagaoka Contemporary's Collection. Despite its rich collection, however, the museum became even better known for its annual art competition, which culminated yearly in the Nagaoka Contemporary Award Exhibition. In addition to Japanese artists and jurors, from its second year onward, the museum invited representatives from the U.S., Italy, West Germany, and Great Britain to participate in both the competition and judging. The competition also quickly became a crucial foundation for Nagaoka Contemporary's Collection, as the Museum acquired many of the works shown in the competition. The competition became a breakthrough point for many artists who would become leaders in the Japanese avant-garde art scene, such as Mono-ha artist Nobuo Sekine, who received a prize at the competition's 1968 iteration.

In addition to its organized activities to promote art, Nagaoka Contemporary became an informal hub for creatives of the 1960s and 1970s as well. The cafe lobby of the museum's building was a frequent haunt of artists Tadashi Maeyama and Michio Horikawa, who went on establish the Niigata Contemporary Art Collective or GUN (originally short for Gendai Bijutsu Shūdan and later changed to Group Ultra Niigata) together in 1967. The group, which had aspired to exhibit at Nagaoka Contemporary since its inception, presented their first exhibition a floor above the museum at the Nagaoka Culture Hall, and as their fame increased, they eventually went on to show their work at Nagaoka Contemporary as well. The Museum was both the inspiration and planning site for a number of the group's activities, notably including their Land Art project, Event to Change the Image of Snow.

== Collection ==
Aside from the Daiko Collection, a large collection of yoga pieces amassed by Komagata, the Museum was also known for its collections of Japanese contemporary sculpture and prints, as well as international modern painting from the late 19th to the early 20th century. Significant artists represented in the collection included:

- Paul Cézanne
- Salvador Dali
- Tsuguharu Foujita
- Kiyoshi Hasegawa
- Mitsuo Ikeda
- Joan Miró
- Wassily Kandinsky
- Paul Klee
- Ryu Masayuki
- Shunsuke Matsumoto
- Pablo Picasso
- Tarō Okamoto
- Nobuo Sekine
- Jun Sugai
- Frank Stella
- Andrew Wyeth

The building itself was decorated with works from the Museum's permanent collection. An abstract relief by Aomori artist Yoshishige Saito adorned the front of the building. This choice was demonstrative of the many hats the museum wore as a pioneering museum of both contemporary and modern art, as Saito's work sough to the toe the line between two-dimensional painterly works and three-dimensional structure. This particular relief evoked both the abstract expressionist style of the post-World War II, while simultaneously pushing the same conceptual limits that his Mono-ha contemporaries were testing.

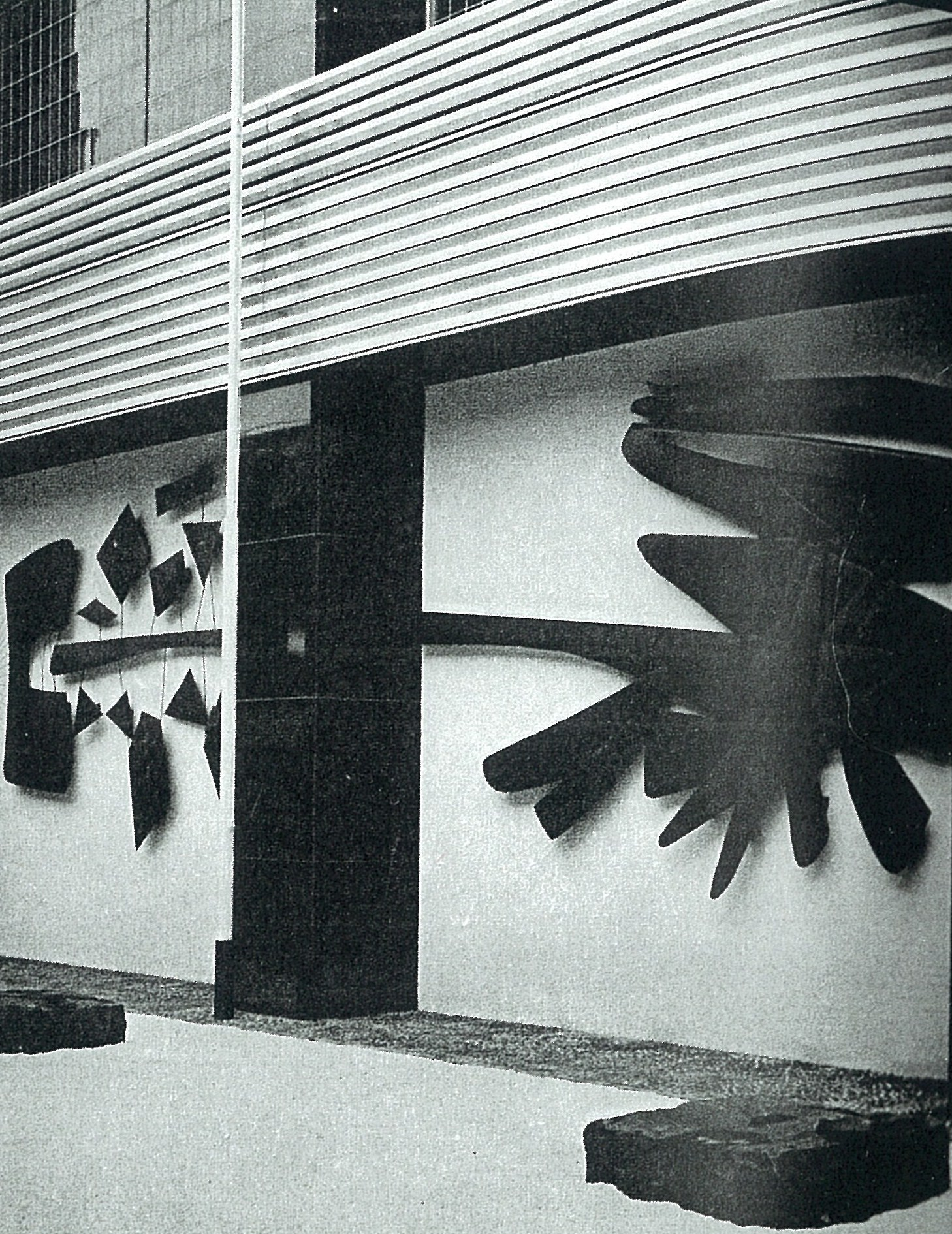
Nagaoka Contemporary Art Museum, Yoshishige Saito relief, 1964

The selection of a mural by the artist Josaku Maeda to decorate the second-floor lobby of the museum was likely also a strategic symbolic choice, as the painter was known for his brightly colored, abstract works that flouted traditional nihonga color palettes and frequently featured mandalas as their primary subject matter. The work of such an artist was ideal for a contemporary art museum that touted its international (at in this case transnational) scope while simultaneously actively supporting the pursuits of local and domestic artists.

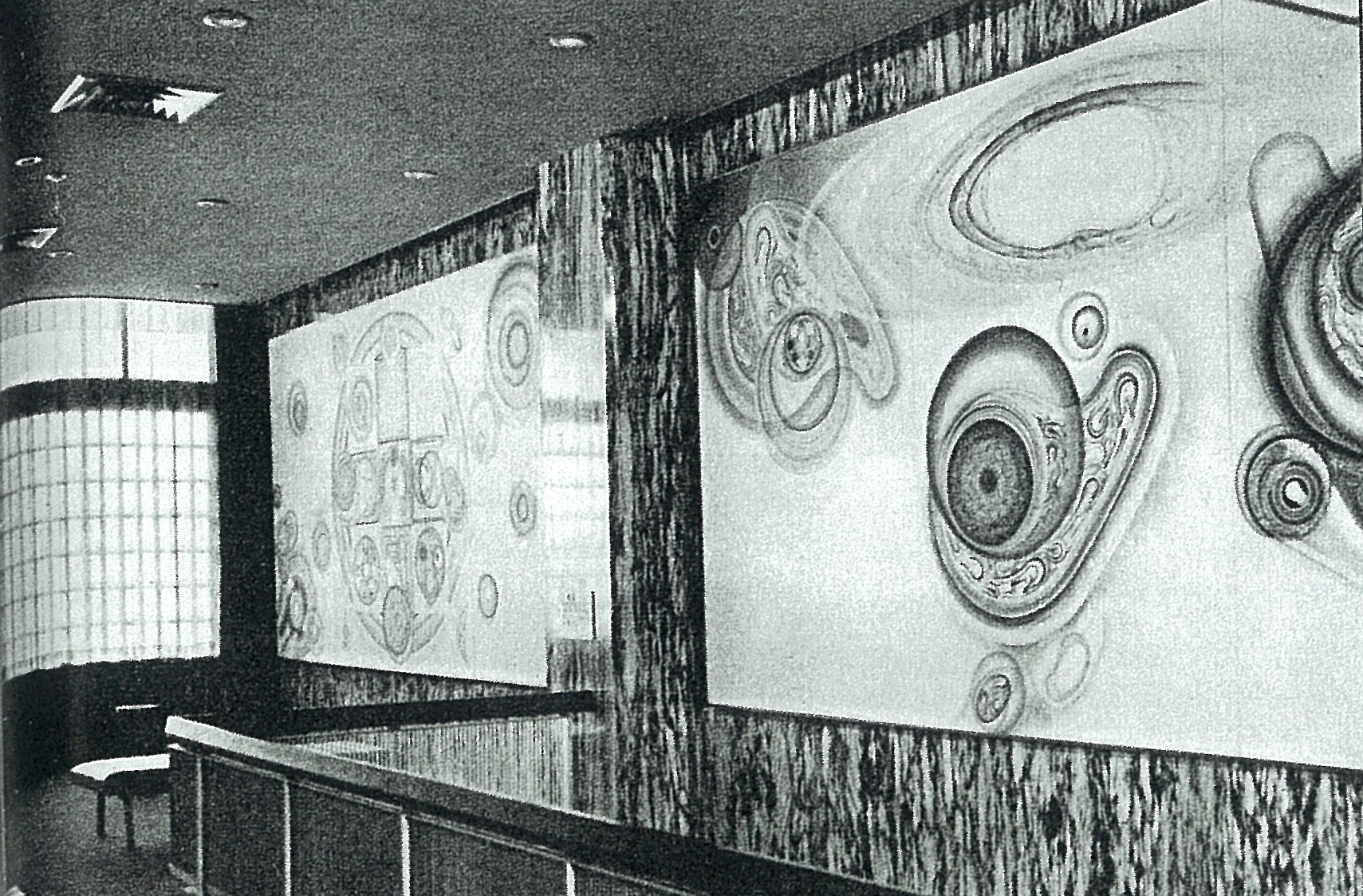
Nagaoka Contemporary Art Museum, Josaku Maeda Wall Painting, 1964

== Major exhibitions ==
Nagaoka Contemporary hosted a total of five annual Award competitions through 1968, with a corresponding exhibition to showcase the work of the participants. The competition's first winner was Japanese artist Shinjiro Okamato in 1964, followed by Italian Enrico Castellani (1966), Katsuhiro Yamaguchi (1967), and Sekine (1968).

== Closure and legacy ==
Despite the success of the Nagaoka Contemporary, it remained financially dependent on Komagata and his businesses, including Daiko Mutual, a large banking firm in Japan at the time. In the 1970s, Daiko Mutual fell into financial straits in the wake of a loan scandal, and the museum was forced to close in 1979 to cover this setback. In recent years, Komagata had also been losing interest in the museum's original mission, believing that the time for contemporary art had passed and shifting his interests instead to earlier Japanese painting and ceramics. As a result, Nagaoka Contemporary was likely lower on his list of priorities as an institution to save, making it an early sacrifice to recovering Daiko Mutual's financial losses.

Nagaoka Contemporary's collection was divided and sold to a number of museums across Japan, and most of the works that remained ultimately became absorbed by the collections at the Niigata Prefectural Museum of Modern Art and the Jukichi Komagata Memorial Museum of Art, both established in Nagaoka City in 1994. The building is now home to the Nagaoka Kawaguchi Cultural Center.

Though relatively short lived, the Nagaoka Contemporary Museum of Art made history as the first contemporary art museum in Japan, and its widespread impact on the contemporary art scene can continue to be seen throughout the country today. The number of contemporary art museums in Japan has increased dramatically since Nagaoka Contemporary first opened in 1964, and such institutions are crucially not limited to the nation's major cities. In the past several decades, a number of internationally renowned contemporary art festivals have emerged across Japan, notably including the Echigo-Tsumari Triennial in Niigata. The development of such a varied infrastructure is in part a product of the pioneering step Nagaoka Contemporary took to introduce contemporary art not only to Japan, but especially to its rural peripheries.

== See also ==
- Echigo-Tsumari Art Triennial
- Gutai Art Association
- Hakone Open Air Museum
- Mono-ha
- Mori Art Museum
- Niigata Prefectural Museum of History
- Setouchi Triennial
- 21st Century Museum of Contemporary Art, Kanazawa
