= List of national universities in Japan =

As of 2022, there were 86 national universities (国立大学, kokuritsu daigaku), 98 public universities and 619 private universities in Japan. National universities tend to be held in higher regard in higher education in Japan than private or public universities.

== History ==
In 2004, the national university system underwent partial privatization. Since 2004, each national university has been incorporated as a National University Corporation (国立大学法人, kokuritsu daigaku hōjin) and given limited autonomy in its operations. Faculty and staff are no longer government employees (国家公務員, kokka kōmuin) working for the Ministry of Education, Culture, Sports, Science and Technology. University names which shifted are "graduate university" (大学院大学, daigakuin daigaku).

== Designated National Universities ==
In April 2017, an amendment to the National University Corporation Act enabled the classification of national university corporations as "Designated National University Corporations", with the stated aims of significantly improving the education and research levels of Japanese universities. As of 2021 a total of 10 national universities have been thus selected by the MEXT.

List of Designated National Universities in Japan
University	Name Change	Location	Designated Time
The University of Tokyo	former Tokyo Imperial University	Tokyo	June 2017
Kyoto University	former Kyoto Imperial University	Kyoto	June 2017
Tohoku University	former Tohoku Imperial University	Sendai	June 2017
Tokyo Institute of Technology	now Institute of Science Tokyo	Tokyo	March 2018
Nagoya University	former Nagoya Imperial University	Nagoya	March 2018
The University of Osaka	former Osaka Imperial University	Osaka	October 2018
Hitotsubashi University	former Tokyo University of Commerce	Tokyo	September 2019
University of Tsukuba	former Tokyo University of Education	Tsukuba	October 2020
Tokyo Medical and Dental University	now Institute of Science Tokyo	Tokyo	October 2020
Kyushu University	former Kyushu Imperial University	Fukuoka	November 2021

== List of national universities ==
The list is in alphabetical order:

1. Aichi University of Education
2. Akita University
3. Asahikawa Medical University
4. Chiba University
5. Ehime University
6. Fukuoka University of Education
7. Fukushima University
8. Gifu University
9. The Graduate University for Advanced Studies (SOKENDAI)
10. Gunma University
11. Hamamatsu University School of Medicine
12. Hirosaki University
13. Hiroshima University
14. Hokkaido University (former Hokkaido Imperial University)
15. Hokkaido University of Education
16. Hyogo University of Teacher Education
17. Ibaraki University
18. Iwate University
19. Japan Advanced Institute of Science and Technology (JAIST)
20. Joetsu University of Education
21. Kagawa University
22. Kagoshima University
23. Kanazawa University
24. Kitami Institute of Technology
25. Kobe University
26. Kochi University
27. Kumamoto University
28. Kyoto Institute of Technology
29. Kyoto University of Education
30. Kyushu Institute of Technology
31. Mie University
32. Miyagi University of Education
33. Muroran Institute of Technology
34. Nagaoka University of Technology
35. Nagasaki University
36. Nagoya Institute of Technology
37. Nara Institute of Science and Technology (NAIST)
38. Nara University of Education
39. Nara Women's University
40. Naruto University of Education
41. National Graduate Institute for Policy Studies (GRIPS)
42. National Institute of Fitness and Sports in Kanoya
43. Niigata University
44. Obihiro University of Agriculture and Veterinary Medicine
45. Ochanomizu University
46. Oita University
47. Okayama University
48. Osaka Kyoiku University
49. Otaru University of Commerce
50. Saga University
51. Saitama University
52. Shiga University
53. Shiga University of Medical Science
54. Shimane University
55. Shinshu University
56. Shizuoka University
57. Tokushima University
58. Tokyo Gakugei University
59. Tokyo University of Agriculture and Technology
60. Tokyo University of Foreign Studies
61. Tokyo University of Marine Science and Technology
62. Tokyo University of the Arts
63. Tottori University
64. Toyohashi University of Technology
65. Tsukuba University of Technology
66. University of Electro-Communications
67. University of Fukui
68. University of Miyazaki
69. University of the Ryukyus
70. University of Toyama
71. University of Yamanashi
72. Utsunomiya University
73. Wakayama University
74. Yamagata University
75. Yamaguchi University
76. Yokohama National University

== Exceptions ==
Although The Open University of Japan and Okinawa Institute of Science and Technology are founded by the national government's initiatives and heavily subsidised by the government, they are classified as private.

== See also ==
- Education in Japan
- Going broke universities – Disappearing universities
- Imperial Universities
- List of public universities in Japan
- List of universities in Japan
- National University Corporation
