= Nigata Station (disambiguation) =

Nigata or Niigata Station may refer to:

- Nigata Station (仁方駅), in Kure, Hiroshima Prefecture, Japan
- Niigata Station (新潟駅), in Niigata, Niigata Prefecture, Japan

== See also ==
- Nigatake Station (苦竹駅), in Sendai, Miyagi Prefecture, Japan
- Niigata-daigaku-mae Station (新潟大学前駅), in Niigata, Niigata Prefecture, Japan
- Niigata Kamotsu Terminal Station (新潟貨物ターミナル駅), in Niigata, Niigata Prefecture, Japan
