= Hyogo University of Teacher Education =

Higher education institution in Hyōgo Prefecture, Japan

Coordinates: 34°54′42″N 135°00′57″E

- 兵庫教育大学
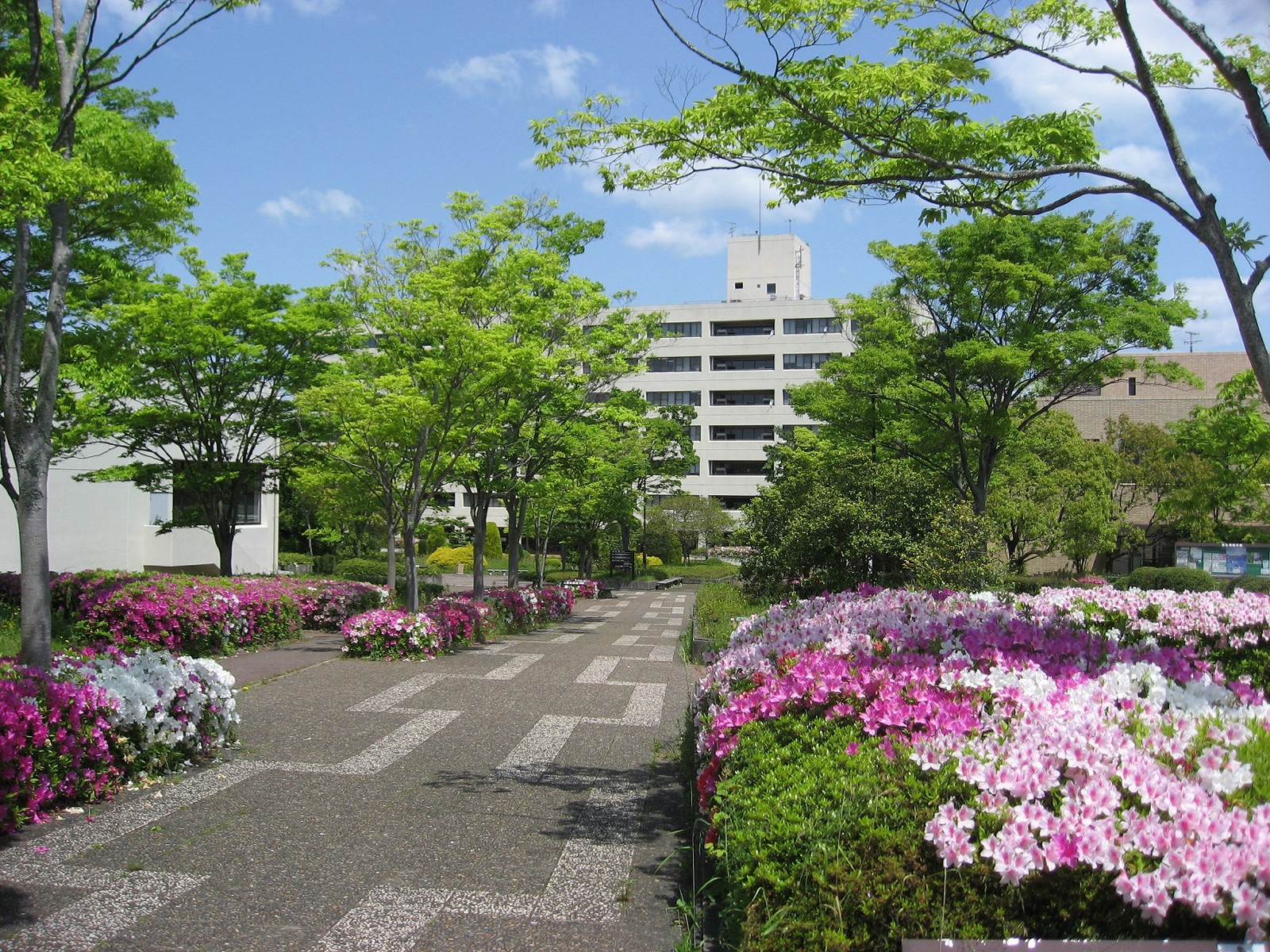
- Type: National University
- Established: 1978
- Location: Katō, Hyōgo, Japan
- Website: www.office.hyogo-u.ac.jp

Hyogo University of Teacher Education (兵庫教育大学, Hyōgo Kyōiku Daigaku) is a national university in Katō, Hyōgo, Japan, founded as "New Concept University" of Teacher Education for Undergraduate and Graduate in 1978.

Graduate School satellite campus in Kobe was established in 2000.

== See also ==
- Darryl Takizo Yagi
- Japanese national university
- Vanderbilt University's Peabody College of education - Cooperative relationship
- University of Wisconsin - Eau Claire - Academic exchange
- Seoul National University of Education - Academic exchange
- Daegu National University of Education - Academic exchange
