= Róza Ádány =

Hungarian physician

Róza Ádány (born 11 December 1952, Berettyóújfalu) is a Hungarian physician, specialist in clinical laboratory diagnostics and in preventive medicine and public health, a university professor. She is the founding dean of the Faculty of Public Health at the University of Debrecen and an internationally recognized expert in public health education and research.

== Career ==
She completed her secondary education at the Reformed College of Debrecen, graduating in 1971. She earned her medical degree summa cum laude from the University of Debrecen Medical School in 1977.

Between 1977 and 1982, she worked at the Department of Anatomy, Histology and Embryology of the University of Debrecen Medical School. Then, from 1982 to 1993, she was a staff member of the Department of Clinical Chemistry. She held research fellowships at the State University of New York (1988), Thomas Jefferson University in Philadelphia (1989–1990), and Gifu University in Japan (1992). She obtained the Doctor of the Hungarian Academy of Sciences (D.Sc.) degree in 1992.

In 1993, she was appointed full professor and director of the Department of Public Health and Epidemiology (later the Department of Preventive Medicine), a position she held until 2017. From 2005 to 2012 she served as the founding dean of the Faculty of Public Health at the University of Debrecen, and between 2007 and 2013 she was the vice-president responsible for medical specialization and postgraduate training of the Medical and Health Science Centre.

From 2021 to 2024, she was a visiting professor at Semmelweis University and senior adviser to the Epidemiology and Surveillance Centre. Since November 2024, she has been a professor at the Institute of Preventive Medicine and Public Health of Semmelweis University.

== Scientific work ==
Her early research focused on connective tissue matrix biology and tumour matrix biology, particularly the role of tumor-associated macrophages. In recognition of her contributions, she received the Distinguished Scientist Award of the Japanese Society for the Promotion of Science (1992), which led to a visiting professorship at Gifu University in the first semester of the academic year 1992/93. At the request of CRC Press, she edited the handbook Tumor Matrix Biology.

Her public health research focuses on the determinants of premature mortality in Hungary and of cancer and cardiovascular diseases. Her current work investigates the impact of genetic and environmental risk factors and social inequalities on population health.

Under her leadership, pioneering and widely cited studies have been conducted on the health status and health behavior of the Roma population.

She also supervised PhD graduates.

== Institution‑building activities ==
She played a key role in the establishment of:

• the Faculty of Public Health at the University of Debrecen (2005–2022), later integrated into the Faculty of Health Sciences;

• the MTA–DE (later ELKH‑DE, then HUN‑REN‑DE) Public Health Research Group (2007–2022);

• the WHO Collaborating Centre on Vulnerability and Health at the University of Debrecen (2012–2020);

• the WHO Collaborating Centre on Healthy Ageing at Semmelweis University, jointly with Professor Zoltán Ungvári (2025–present);

• the National Association of Public Health Training and Research Institutes (HAPHI), founded in 2007, of which she served as president until 2020 and is now honorary president. The international reputation of HAPHI is indicated by the fact, that in 2020 Róza Ádány as the founding president of HAPHI was awarded by the World Federation of Public Health Associations’ highest honour, the Hugh R. Leavell Award for exceptional contribution to improve population health globally.

Under her leadership, Hungary developed a comprehensive public health education system covering the full training spectrum (undergraduate, graduate, postgraduate) training spectrum.

== International activities ==
• President of the Association of Schools of Public Health in the European Region (ASPHER) (2011–2013)

• Member of the Governing Council of the European Public Health Association (EUPHA); co‑chair and later chair of the Public Health Genomics Section (2015–2021); co‑chair of the Healthy Ageing Section (2023–present)

• Co‑chair of the WHO European Advisory Committee on Health Research (2012–2021)

• Member of the EU Horizon 2020 Advisory Board (2014–2018)

• Member of the Advisory Board of the WHO “Ageing is Living 2026–2030” flagship project (2025–present)

== Public policy activities ==
- Coordination of the development of the health plans of Debrecen (2002, 2008) and Budapest (2012–2014)
- Coordination of the strategic planning of the National Public Health Programme (2018–2030; 2023–2033)
- Organisation and operation of the General Practitioners’ Morbidity Data Collection Programme (1998–2017)
- Coordination of the establishment of the North‑East Hungarian Health Observatory (2005)
- Coordination of the primary care development model programme based on general practitioners’ clusters, supported by the Hungarian Government and the Swiss Contribution (2012–2016), integrating primary care and public health services.

She has led more than forty national research and educational development projects, including the major project “Improving the competitiveness of the Hungarian economy through identifying target groups and content of public health interventions to improve population health” (2016–2021), which resulted in 123 international publications and 32 completed PhD degrees. Her research groups have participated in more than twenty international projects, often under her leadership.

== Bibliometrics ==
(as of 20 May 2026)

- Total publications: 518
- Publications in international journals: 315
- Cumulative impact factor: 902
- Citations (Google Scholar): over 12,600
- Independent citations (MTMT): 6,864
- Hirsch index (Google Scholar): 55

== Edited/co‑edited books and textbooks ==
(all published by Medicina Publishing)

- Fundamentals of Oncology (1997; co‑editors: Miklós Kásler, István Ember, László Kopper, László Thurzó)
- Dictionary of Epidemiology (2003; co‑editor: Piroska V. Hajdú)
- The Health Status of the Hungarian Population at the Turn of the Millennium (2003)
- Preventive Medicine and Public Health (2006, 2012; first and second editions)
- Public Health Genomics (2013; co‑editors: Judit Sándor, Angela Brand)
- Public Health in Budapest (2014; co‑editor: Tamás Szentes)
- Health Diplomacy (2014; co‑editors: Mihály Kökény, Ilona Kickbusch)
- Public Health Medicine (2015; co‑editors: István Kárpáti, György Paragh)
- Preventive Services in Primary Care (2017; co‑editor: Magor Papp)
- Preventive Medicine and Public Health (third edition, 2023; co‑editors: István Kiss, Edit Paulik, János Sándor, Zoltán Ungvári)

== Awards and honours ==
- István Weszprémi Award, University Medical School of Debrecen (1977)
- Fogarty International Research Fellowship, NIH (1989–1990)
- Distinguished Scientist Award, Japanese Society for the Promotion of Science (1992)
- Pándy and Jendrassik Awards, Hungarian Society of Laboratory Medicine (1992, 2000)
- Széchenyi Professorial Scholarship (1997–2000)
- Medal for Hungarian Higher Education (1998)
- Medal of the Hungarian Public Health Scientific Society (2000, 2006)
- Albert Szent‑Györgyi Medal (2001)
- Hatvani Award of the City of Debrecen (2005)
- Semmelweis Award (2006)
- Öveges Professorial Scholarship (2006)
- Endre Hőgyes Award (2007)
- Leó Szilárd Professorial Scholarship (2009)
- Pro Auditoribus Universitatis Debreceniensis Award (2010)
- Pro Urbe Award of the City of Debrecen (2011)
- Krompecher Award, University of Debrecen (2013)
- Budapest Award (2013)
- WHO Regional Director’s Award (2019, 2023)
- H.R. Leavell Award, World Federation of Public Health Associations (2020)
- Ádám Szendei Award (2020)
- Officer’s Cross of the Order of Merit of Hungary (2022)
