= College of Biomedical Technology Niigata University =

Junior college in Niigata, Japan

Coordinates: 37°55′22″N 139°2′9.2″E

- 新潟大学医療技術短期大学部
- Type: National
- Established: 1974
- Location: Niigata, Niigata, Japan
- Website: http://www.niigata-u.ac.jp/profile1/50_outline_010.html

College of Biomedical Technology Niigata University (新潟大学医療技術短期大学部, Niigata Daigaku Iryō Gijutsu Tanki Daigakubu) is a National junior college in Niigata, Niigata, Japan.

== History ==
- 1974, Junior College was set up.
- 1999, Registration of student was ended in this year.
- 2003, Junior College was discontinued.

== Names of Academic department ==
- Nursing studies
- technology studies
- Medical laboratory studies

== Advanced course ==
- Midwifery studies

== See also ==
- Niigata University
