= Lin Yaw-shing =

Taiwanese physician and politician

Lin Yaw-shing (Chinese: 林耀興; born 17 October 1959) is a Taiwanese physician and politician.

Lin graduated from Taichung First Senior High School, then attended Taipei Medical University before earning a doctorate from Shiga University of Medical Science in Japan. He taught as an associate professor at China Medical College. Lin was elected to the Legislative Yuan as a member of the Kuomintang for the first time in 1995. He claimed 12.36% of the vote share in Taichung County, winning the most votes of any candidate in the multi-member constituency. Lin was reelected in 1998, although his vote share fell to 7.82%. Lin ran unsuccessfully for a third term in 2001, as his vote share was reduced to 4.51%. In 2008, Tsai Huang-liang accused Lin of accepting NT$3.5 million from the Taiwan Dental Association, after Tsai had already been implicated in the same case.
