= Morimura =

Morimura (written: 森村 lit. "forest village") is a Japanese surname. Notable people with the surname include:

- Shigeki Morimura (森村 茂樹, born 1916), Japanese psychiatrist and founder of Hyogo College of Medicine
- Kota Morimura (森村 昂太, born 1988), Japanese footballer
- Sachiko Morimura (born 1972), Japanese Olympic gymnast
- Seiichi Morimura (森村 誠一, 1933–2023), Japanese writer
- Yasumasa Morimura (森村 泰昌, born 1951), Japanese artist
