= Tokai National Higher Education and Research System =

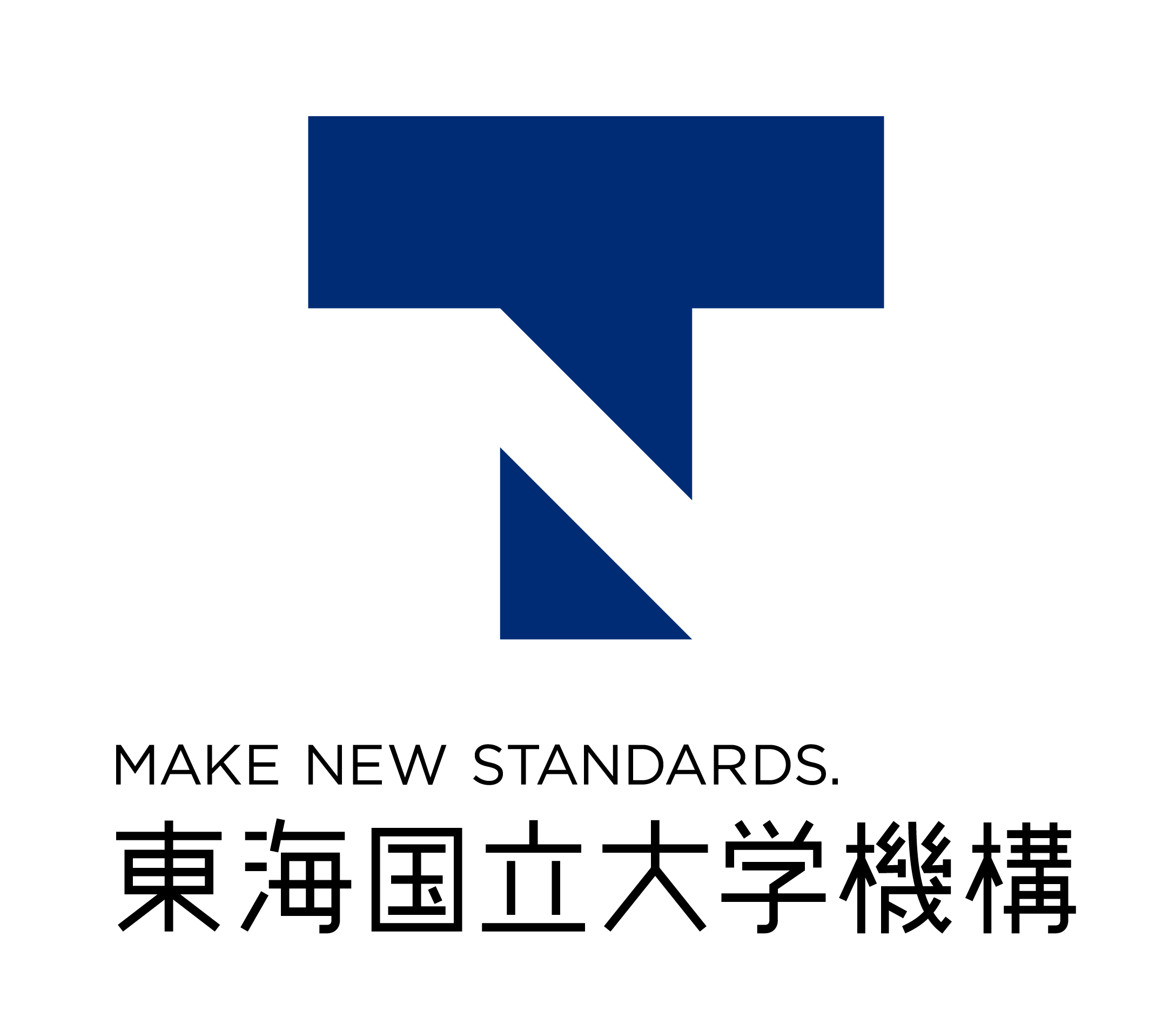
THERS logo

Tokai National Higher Education and Research System (国立大学法人東海国立大学機構, Tōkai Kokuritsu Daigaku Kikō, THERS) is a National University Corporation (legal entity) includes 2 universities, Nagoya University and Gifu University, both are located in Tōkai region, Japan.

== History ==
NUC = National University Corporation

- In April 2004, National University Corporation Nagoya University and National University Corporation Gifu University established by the National University Corporation Act. Nagoya University and Gifu University be national universities established by their respective corporations.
- In March 2018, NUC Nagoya University is designated as a Designated National University corporation.
- In December 2018, NUC Nagoya University and NUC Gifu University conclude an agreement on the integration of corporations.
- In May 2019, the National Diet amends the law. It was announced that the National University Corporation Tokai National Higher Education and Research System will be newly established in 2020.
- On April 1, 2020, the Tokai National Higher Education and Research System (THERS) was established.

== Members ==
- Gifu University
- Nagoya University

== See also ==
- National University Corporation
- Imperial Universities
- List of national universities in Japan
- List of universities in Japan
- Education in Japan
- National university
