= Emi Nishimura =

Japanese biologist and academic

Emi K. Nishimura
- Education: Kyoto University; Shiga University of Medical Science
- Scientific career
- Workplaces: Harvard Medical School; University of Tokyo; Kanazawa University

Emi K. Nishimura (Japanese: 西村 栄美, romanized: Nishimura Emi) is a Japanese biologist who is Professor of Ageing and Regeneration at the University of Tokyo. Her research considers the molecular mechanisms that underpin ageing. She was elected Fellow of the National Academy of Sciences in 2022.

== Early life and education ==
Nishimura completed her master's degree at Shiga University of Medical Science and was a doctoral researcher at Kyoto University. After earning her doctorate she moved to Harvard Medical School, where she was a postdoctoral researcher with David Fisher.

== Research and career ==
In 2009, Nishimura moved to the University of Tokyo. Her research considers the science of ageing. Nishimura studied the stem cells in hair follicles, and showed that when they are damaged by age they turn into skin, eventually causing hair follicles to shrink. The regeneration of hair follicle stem cells is a cyclical process, where they undergo active and dormant phases. She showed that certain cancers may start in hair follicle stem cells. These cancerous pigment stem cells can migrate out of the follicles, building melanoma on the surface of skin.

In 2021, Nishimura showed that stem cells in the skin are important in the regeneration. Skin stem cells (keratinocyte stem cells) promote re-epithelialisation, and older stem cells are less mobile. Her work showed that in older stem cells the epidermal growth factor receptor is diminished, which results in the degradation of COL17A1. She showed that COL17A1 coordinates the movement of stem cells towards wounds.

== Awards and honours ==
- 2002 Shiseido Award
- 2012 Ogawa-Seiji Award
- 2012 8th Japan Academy Medal Prize
- 2014 CHANEL-CE.R.I.E.S. Research Award
- 2017 International Federation of Pigment Cell Societies Myron Gordon Award
- 2022 Elected Fellow of the National Academy of Sciences

== Selected publications ==
- Emi K Nishimura; Siobhán A Jordan; Hideo Oshima; et al. (1 April 2002). "Dominant role of the niche in melanocyte stem-cell fate determination". Nature. 416 (6883): 854–860. Bibcode:2002Natur.416..854N. doi:10.1038/416854a. ISSN 1476-4687. PMID 11976685. Wikidata Q57338437.
- Emi K Nishimura; Scott R Granter; David E Fisher (23 December 2004). "Mechanisms of hair graying: incomplete melanocyte stem cell maintenance in the niche". Science. 307 (5710): 720–724. Bibcode:2005Sci...307..720N. doi:10.1126/science.1099593. ISSN 0036-8075. PMID 15618488. Wikidata Q33984016.
- Emi K Nishimura (5 May 2011). "Melanocyte stem cells: a melanocyte reservoir in hair follicles for hair and skin pigmentation". Pigment Cell & Melanoma Research. 24 (3): 401–410. doi:10.1111/j.1755-148x.2011.00855.x. ISSN 1755-1471. PMID 21466661. Wikidata Q37861902.
