= Michio Horikawa =

Japanese artist

- Born: 1946 (age 79–80); Niigata Prefecture, Japan
- Education: Niigata University, Joetsu University of Education

Michio Horikawa (堀川紀夫, Horikawa Michio; born 1946) is a Japanese artist. In 1967, he co-founded the art collective GUN (acronym of Group Ultra Niigata) with fellow artist Tadashi Maeyama. Up until 1975, Horikawa individually and collectively created artwork under the name GUN, in the form of mail art, land art, and other forms of conceptualism. Currently, Horikawa lives and works in Niigata, Japan, and he is represented by Misa Shin Gallery in Tokyo.

== Early life and education ==
Horikawa was born and raised in Niigata on the coast of the Sea of Japan. While in high school, he met fellow artist Tadashi Maeyama, one year senior to him, and they both studied at the teachers' college of Niigata University, one year apart. As a college student, Horikawa was interested in minimalist art. In 1964, the Nagaoka Contemporary Art Museum, Japan’s first museum dedicated to contemporary art, was open in the city of Nagaoka by a private collector (a local banker). The museum was located one hour from the city of Takada where Horikawa lived, whereas Tokyo was six hours away. Seeing American and European contemporary art in person was inspirational for Horikawa who had previously only seen such works in publications.

In 1968, Horikawa received his BFA in Art Education from Niigata University. He then received his MFA in Art Education in 1986 from Joetsu University of Education (Joetsu, Niigata Prefecture).

== Work ==
Horikawa’s conceptual series Mail Art by Sending Stones (1969–1972) was influenced by the mail art of On Kawara, Yutaka Matsuzawa, the Shizuoka-based artist group Genshoku, and Jiro Takamatsu’s stone-based work. Furthermore, Horikawa had encountered Robert Smithson’s land art through the magazine Bijutsu techo.

For The Shinano River Plan: 11 (July 1969), one of the first projects in Mail Art by Sending Stones, Horikawa was inspired by the landing of Apollo 11 on the Moon. The astronauts on the mission were tasked with collecting rock samples the surface of the Moon to bring back to Earth for scientific study. In response, Horikawa went to the nearby Shinano River to collect rocks along the dry riverbed. Horikawa then brought the stones to the local post office, where he shipped them to eleven people, reflecting the Apollo mission number. In addition, Horikawa published an accompanying statement arguing for the need to focus on the events on Earth at the time despite the significance of the first Moon landing.

Second in the series, in conjunction with Apollo 12, was The Shinano River Plan: 12 (November 1969). In December 1969, as part of Psychophysiology Research Institute (Seishin Seirigaku Kenkyūjo), a mail-art collective, he mailed a stone to Richard Nixon as a Christmas present. By contrasting rocks from outer space with earthbound ones, art historian Reiko Tomii has suggested that Horikawa’s work highlighted two fronts of the Cold War. The first was the Space Race. The second was the Vietnam War, during which the United States military bases in Japan were strategic for its Pacific forces.
