= National University Corporation Tsukuba University of Technology =

Coordinates: 36°06′19″N 140°06′38″E

- 筑波技術大学
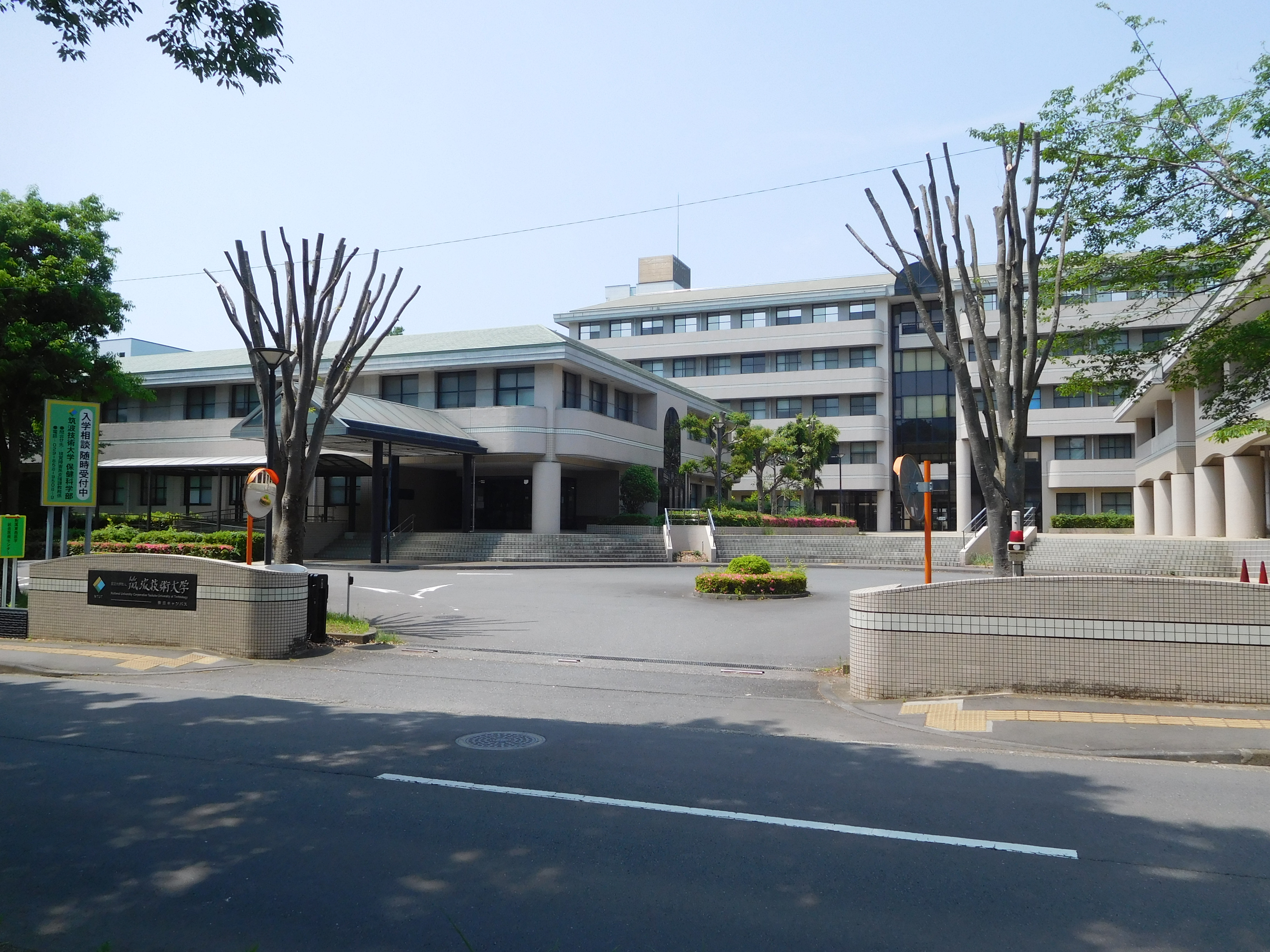
- Kasuga Campus(One of NTUT's Campus)
- Type: National university
- Established: 1987
- Location: Tsukuba, Ibaraki, Japan
- Website: Official website

National University Corporation Tsukuba University of Technology (筑波技術大学, Tsukuba Gijutsu Daigaku), or NTUT, is a national university in Tsukuba, Ibaraki, Japan. The predecessor of the school was founded in 1987, and it was chartered as a university in 2005. It is Japan's only national university that is focused on the education of students with special needs, including hearing impaired/deaf and visually impaired/blind students.

The school has several special needs programs:

- Special Needs Education for the Visually Impaired
  - PreK - advanced vocational
- Special Needs Education for the Deaf
  - PreK - advanced vocational
- Special Needs Education for the Mentally Challenged
  - PreK - advanced vocational
- Special Needs Education for the Physically Challenged
  - elementary - advanced vocational
- Special Needs Education for the Children with Autism
  - preschool and elementary
