= Terao Station =

Railway station in Niigata, Japan

Terao Station 寺尾駅
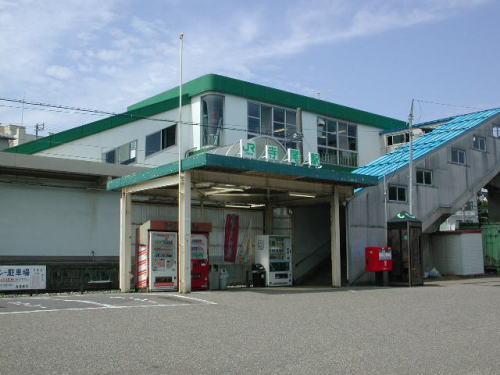
- The south side of Terao Station in July 2004

General information
- Location: 2 Terao, Nishi-ku, Niigata-shi, Niigata-ken 950-2055; Japan
- Coordinates: 37.8792°N 138.9739°E
- Operator: JR East
- Line: ■Echigo Line
- Distance: 74.4 km from Kashiwazaki
- Platforms: 1 island platform
- Tracks: 2

Other information
- Status: Staffed ( "Midori no Madoguchi")
- Website: Official website

History
- Opened: 20 October 1914

Passengers
- FY2017: 2.088 daily

Services
Preceding station	JR East	Following station
Niigata University towards Kashiwazaki	Echigo Line	Kobari towards Niigata
Location
- Location within JR Echigo Line Location within Japan

Terao Station (寺尾駅, Terao-eki) is a railway station on the Echigo Line in Nishi-ku, Niigata, Niigata Prefecture, Japan, operated by East Japan Railway Company (JR East).

== Lines ==
Terao Station is served by the Echigo Line, and is 74.4 kilometers from the starting point of the line at Kashiwazaki Station.

== Layout ==
The station consists of an island platform serving two tracks, with an elevated station building situated above the tracks.

The station has a "Midori no Madoguchi" staffed ticket office. Suica farecard can be used at this station.

=== Platforms ===
1	■ Echigo Line	for Yoshida
2	■ Echigo Line	for Niigata

== History ==
The station opened on 20 October 1914. With the privatization of Japanese National Railways (JNR) on 1 April 1987, the station came under the control of JR East.

== Passenger statistics ==
In fiscal 2017, the station was used by an average of 2088 passengers daily (boarding passengers only).

== Surrounding area ==
- Niigata College of Technology
- Nishi-ku Ward Office

== See also ==
- List of railway stations in Japan
