= Tadashi Maeyama =

Japanese artist

- Born: Niigata Prefecture, Japan
- Education: Niigata University

Tadashi Maeyama (前山忠, Maeyama Tadashi; born 1944) is a Japanese artist. In 1967, he co-founded the art collective GUN with fellow artist Michio Horikawa. Together with Horikawa, Maeyama were GUN's leading members. Maeyama currently lives and works in Niigata, Japan.

== Early life and education ==
Maeyama was born in the village of Sanwa, Nakakubiki District, in the city of Takada (now Jōetsu), in the Niigata Prefecture, which is on the coast of the Sea of Japan. Far from Tokyo, Niigata was prototypical of rural Japan. Maeyama was the eldest son of a farming family, and he was expected to inherit the family property. Nonetheless, he had to seek employment because his family did not own large enough land to generate a sustainable income.

While in high school, he met fellow artist Michio Horikawa, and they later attended a teachers' college together at Niigata University. Maeyama sought to become an art teacher to make a living while also being able to make art. During his second year as a college student, Maeyama began frequenting to Tokyo to better understand contemporary art in the capital. Additionally, he continued to learn about contemporary art through mostly black-and-white reproductions in art magazines such as Bijutsu techō.

In 1966, during his final year at Niigata University, Maeyama had his first solo exhibition at Lunami Gallery in Tokyo. As a rental art gallery, Lunami did not require qualifications to show, except for paying weekly rental fees. As a result, such spaces were suitable for exhibiting experimental art.

In 1967, Maeyama received his BFA from Niigata University.

== Formation of GUN art collective ==
In Tokyo, Maeyama became acquainted with the young art critic Junzō Ishiko from Shizuoka Prefecture. In October 1967, thanks to Ishiko’s encouragement, Maeyama formed the art collective GUN. Initially they called their group Niigata Contemporary Art Collective GUN (Niigata Gendai Bijutsu Shūdan GUN). The word GUN came from the onomatopoeia gān, expressing the group’s desire to make a big impact. Later, the photographer and GUN collaborator, Mitsutoshi Hanaga interpreted GUN as an acronym for Group Ultra Niigata, which the group was happy to adopt.

GUN group members frequently met at the lobby café in the same building that housed on the first floor the Nagaoka Contemporary Art Museum, Japan’s first museum dedicated to contemporary art. In December 1967, GUN held their first exhibition by renting the Nagaoka Culture Hall, which sat one floor above the Nagaoka Contemporary Art Museum. The exhibition included fourteen artists, brought together critics and art professionals, and featured a symposium along with happenings.

Throughout its time as a group, GUN’s membership was fluid. Under the name GUN, Maeyama would create art both as an individual artist and as part of the art collective.

== Work and career ==
During GUN’s initial few years, Maeyama was known for making artwork featuring mirrors and female iconography in a pop art manner, such as in Breaching an Idea (1967).

By 1970, Maeyama’s art became more politically engaged. In 1960 and 1970, the nationwide Anpo protests were organized in opposition to the US-Japan Security Treaty, a treaty that allowed the United States to maintain military bases on Japanese soil. The protests were particularly intense against the backdrop of the Cold War and the Vietnam War, during which US military bases in Japan were strategic for its Pacific forces.

=== Postal Mailing Front ===
From 1969 to 1970, Maeyama became politically motivated by the events surrounding the Konishi Anti-Military Struggle, which centered on Makoto Konishi, an airman part of the Japan Self-Defense Forces stationed on the island of Sado in Niigata Prefecture. For distributing anti-military fliers and refusing to participate in training, Konishi was arrested and tried for the crime of sabotage. Konishi’s trial took place from 1970 to 1975. Maeyama joined the demonstrations in support of Konishi from 1970 to 1971. The experience laid the groundwork for GUN’s Postal Mailing Front, which sought to forge a nationwide antiwar alliance among teachers and activists. As part of their efforts, the Postal Mailing Front included issuing newsletters in the form of political tabloids and a mail art project from 1969 to 1970 that consisted of anti-authority interventions within the postal system. In turn, the Postal Mailing Front served as a platform for the group to disseminate their conceptualist works of art.

As part of the Postal Mailing Front, Maeyama, Michio Horikawa, and Hideharu Satō developed strategies for pushing the limits of postal regulations using prepaid postcards. Their methods included physically altering the postcards, affixing no or insufficient postage, inscribing a bogus sender and/or recipient, and creating other forms of confusion. For one of his contributions, Maeyama created Double-Sided Nengajō and Notice from Nagano Postal Inspection Office (1970). In his New Year’s postcard, Maeyama copied the addressed side of an already mailed postcard from 1969 onto the text side of new 1970 postcard, which was filled out with the same name and address on its address side. In doing so, Maeyama exemplified the idea of confusion. For that reason, while one the postcards reached its recipient Masunobu Yoshimura (a former member of the art collective Neo Dada), the post office seized the postcard that had been addressed to Horikawa and returned it to Maeyama with an official notice warning him not to do it again. Maeyama subsequently incorporated the returned postcard and official notice into his March 1970 contribution to the publication Psychophysiology Research Institute. According to art historian Reiko Tomii, Maeyama's intervention challenged the postal system as a state-run institution, especially within the conformity of Japanese society.

=== Antiwar Stickers and Antiwar Flag ===
Following GUN’s newfound political voice as the result of the Konishi Anti-Military Struggle, the group began circulating newsletters incorporating political sloganeering and conceptualist art strategies. The inaugural issue in March 1971 proclaimed “Stand Up, All Fighting Workers, Students, and Citizens, for the Anti-Imperialism Struggle!” As part of the newsletter, Maeyama designed three stickers with the words 反保 (Anti-Anpo), 反戦 (Anti-War), and 叛軍 (Anti-Military). The first sticker was accompanied by the slogan, “Overthrow the US and Japanese emperors!” Those interested could obtain the stickers through a small donation of 100 yen and show their solidarity by placing the stickers anywhere and everywhere.

In a similar vein, Maeyama also created “Antiwar Flags“ that year featuring three banners displaying 反軍 (Anti-Military), 反帝 (Anti-Imperialism), and 反戦 (Anti-War). The year prior in 1970, Maeyama had created the political art piece Antiwar Flag, depicting the US flag shedding blood onto the Japanese flag beneath it. Accompanying Maeyama’s graphic representation were the words “For Vietnam.” In turn, the artwork showed how US bloodshed in the Vietnam War was accepted by Japan, whose complicity in the war at the time was fervently opposed by Japanese activists. Maeyama’s Antiwar Stickers and Antiwar Flag were key examples of the artist’s propagandistic approach in comparison to that of his fellow GUN members.

In May 1971, Maeyama was invited by the critic Ichirō Haryū to show his “Antiwar“ ensemble of stickers and flags at Mainichi Contemporary at the Tokyo Metropolitan Art Museum. Maeyama withdrew his work within a week of opening, however, in response to the event organizer’s removal of his donation box for those interested in obtaining the Antiwar Stickers.

=== After 1972 ===
After 1972, GUN returned to conventional exhibitions and outdoor performances. However, as a follow-up to their earlier political art, in 1977, one year after the 50th anniversary of Hirohito's reign (r. 1926–1989), GUN created work to mark the occasion. Maeyama’s artist’s book Anti-Emperor System traced Japanese history, including Japan’s aggression into Asia under the emperor’s name.
