= Kobari Station =

Railway station in Niigata, Japan

Kobari Station 小針駅
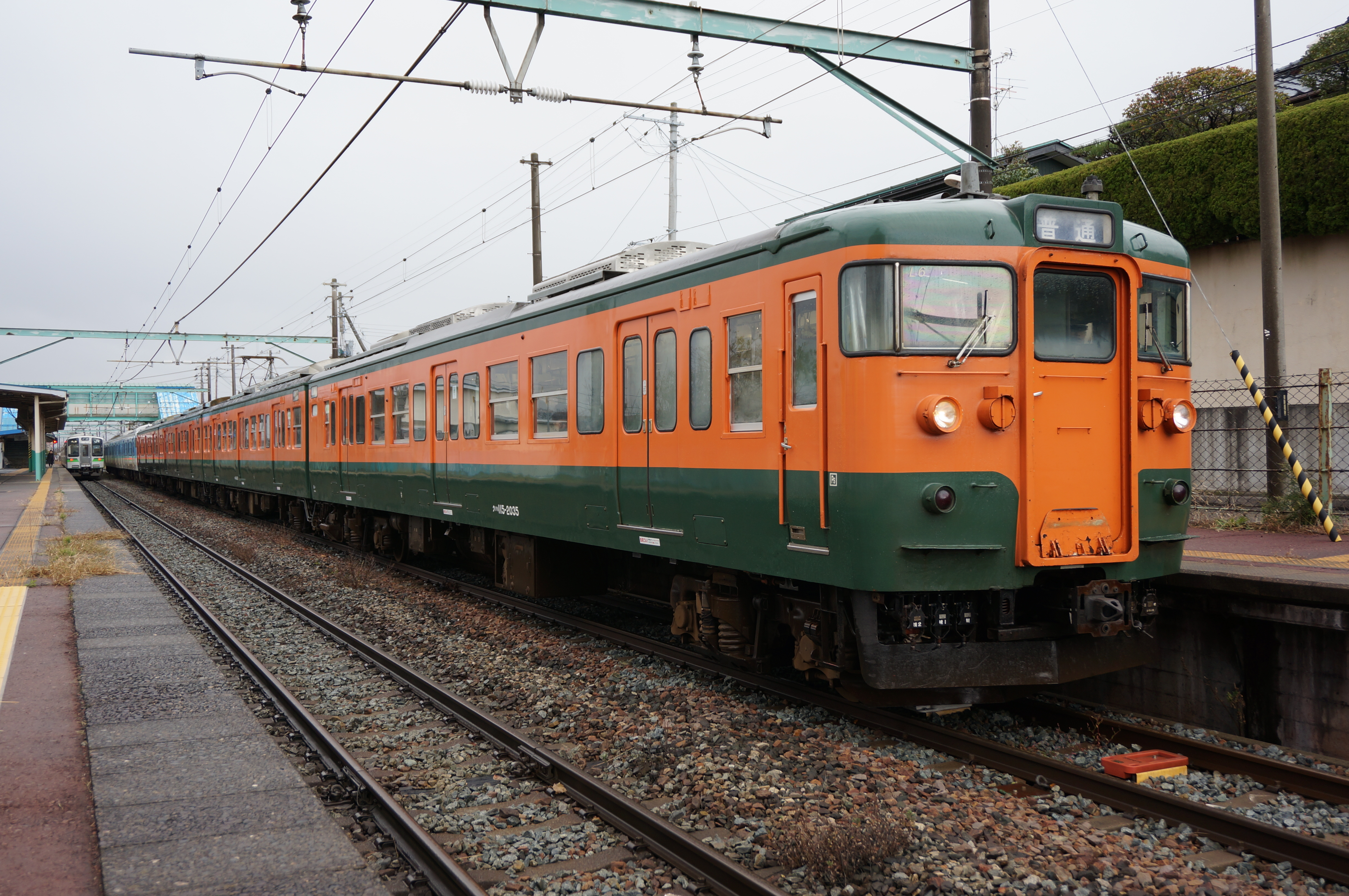
- A local train at track 2 in December 2013

General information
- Location: 5-12 Kobariminamidai, Nishi-ku, Niigata-shi, Niigata-ken 950-2026; Japan
- Coordinates: 37.8897°N 138.9914°E
- Operator: JR East
- Line: ■ Echigo Line
- Distance: 76.3 km from Kashiwazaki
- Platforms: 2 side platforms

Other information
- Status: Staffed ( "Midori no Madoguchi")
- Website: Official website

History
- Opened: 1 June 1960

Passengers
- FY2017: 2,605 daily

Services
Preceding station	JR East	Following station
Terao towards Kashiwazaki	Echigo Line	Aoyama towards Niigata
Location
- Location within JR Echigo Line Location within Japan

Kobari Station (小針駅, Kobari-eki) is a railway station on the Echigo Line in Nishi-ku, Niigata, Niigata Prefecture, Japan, operated by East Japan Railway Company (JR East).

== Lines ==
Kobari Station is served by the Echigo Line, and is 76.3 kilometers from the starting point of the line at Kashiwazaki Station.

== Layout ==
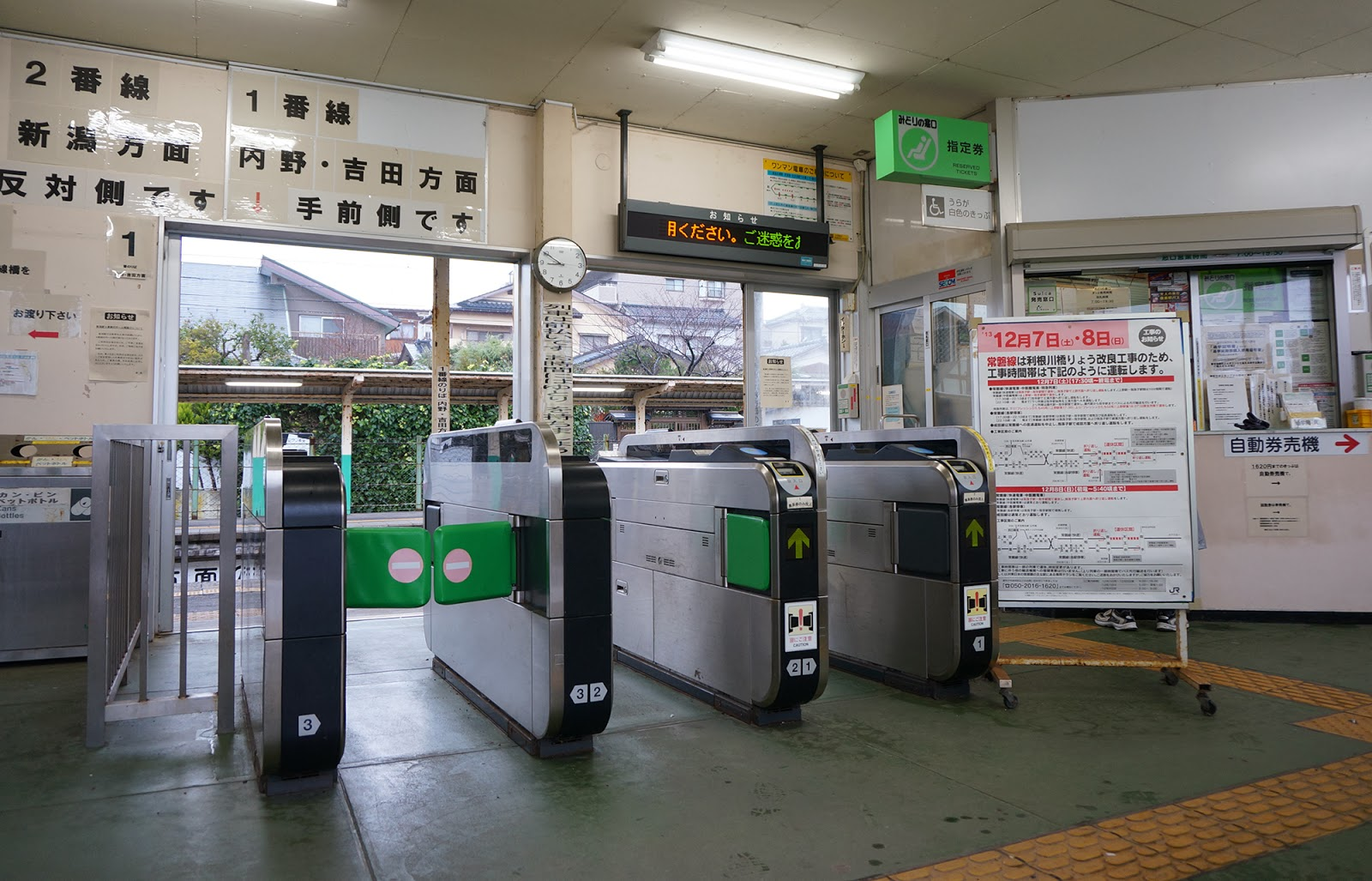
The south gate, December 2013

The station consists of two ground-level opposed side platforms connected by a footbridge, serving two tracks.

The station has a "Midori no Madoguchi" staffed ticket office. Suica farecard can be used at this station.

=== Platforms ===
1	■ Echigo Line	for Yoshida
2	■ Echigo Line	for Niigata

== History ==
The station opened on 1 June 1960. With the privatization of Japanese National Railways (JNR) on 1 April 1987, the station came under the control of JR East.

== Passenger statistics ==
In fiscal 2017, the station was used by an average of 2605 passengers daily (boarding passengers only).

== Surrounding area ==
- Niigata Industrial High School
- Kobari Junior High School
- Kobari Elementary School

== See also ==
- List of railway stations in Japan
