= Miyamae-ku =

Miyamae 宮前区
- Ward
- Miyamae Ward
- Flag

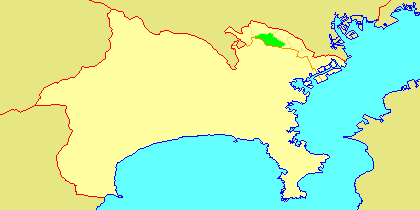
- Location of Miyamae in Kanagawa

- Coordinates: 35°35′21″N 139°34′43″E
- Country: Japan
- Region: Kantō
- Prefecture: Kanagawa
- City: Kawasaki
- Established: April 1, 1972

Area
  - Total: 18.61 km^{2} (7.19 sq mi)

Population (March 2010)
  - Total: 217,251
  - Density: 11,670/km^{2} (30,200/sq mi)
- Time zone: UTC+9 (Japan Standard Time)
- Tree: Sakura
- Flower: Cosmos (flower)
- Address: 2-20-5 Miyamaedaira, Miyamae-ku Kawasaki-shi, Kanagawa-ken; 216-8570
- Website: Miyamae Ward Office

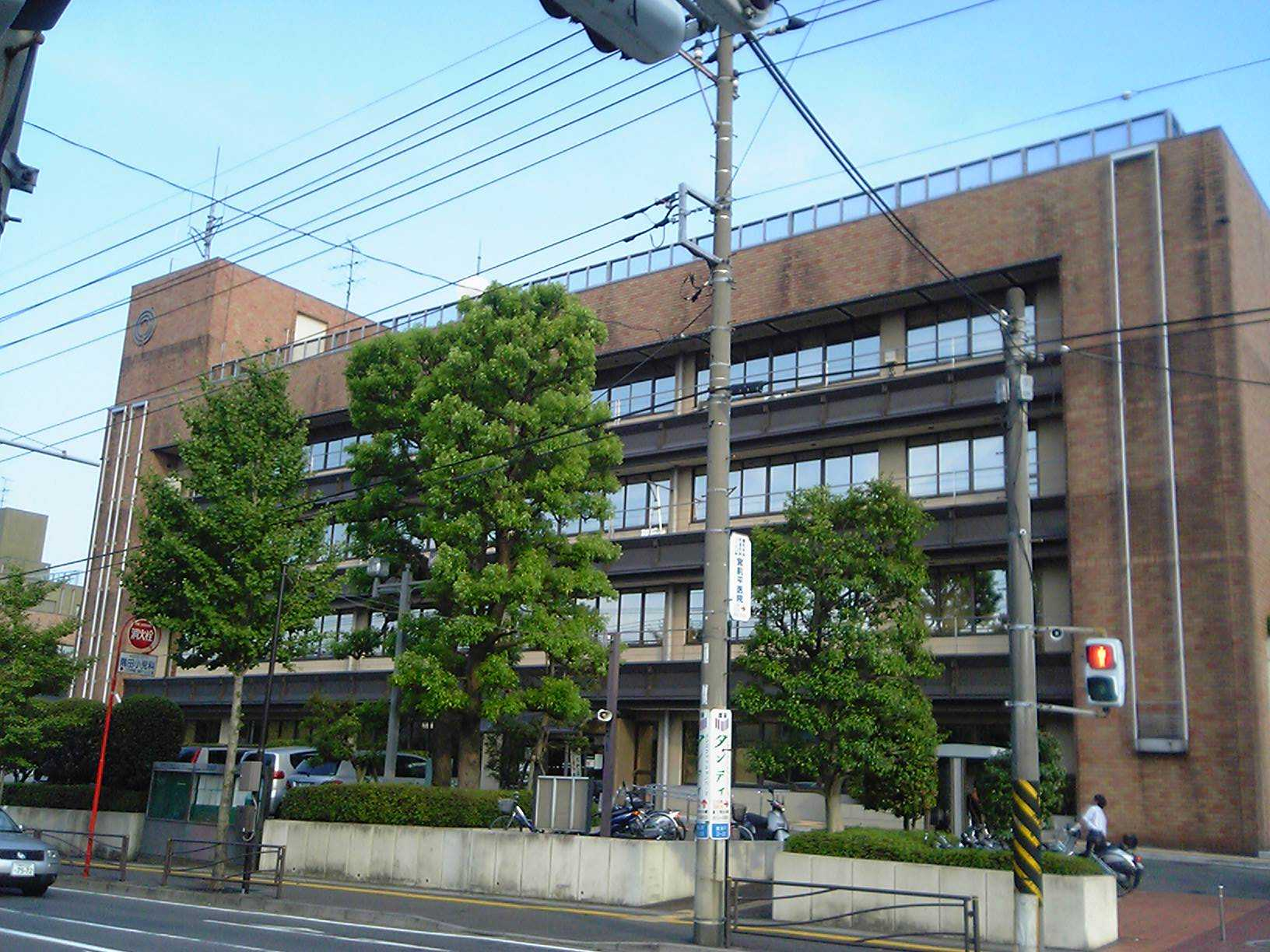
Miyamae Ward Office

Miyamae-ku (宮前区) is one of the 7 wards of the city of Kawasaki in Kanagawa Prefecture, Japan. As of 2010, the ward had an estimated population of 217,251 and a density of 11,670 persons per km^{2}. The total area was 18.61 km^{2}.

== Geography ==
Miyamae Ward is located in eastern Kanagawa Prefecture, in the south-center portion of the city of Kawasaki, bordering on Yokohama.

=== Surrounding municipalities ===
- Tama-ku, Kawasaki
- Takatsu-ku, Kawasaki
- Asao-ku, Kawasaki
- Aoba-ku, Yokohama
- Tsuzuki-ku, Yokohama

== History ==
Archaeologists have found numerous Kofun period remains at numerous locations in what is now Miyamae-ku, indicating a long period of human settlement. Under the Nara period Ritsuryō system, it became part of Tachibana District Musashi Province. In the Edo period, it was administered as tenryō territory controlled directly by the Tokugawa shogunate, but administered through various hatamoto. Due to its proximity to Edo, it was primarily an agricultural and horticultural area supplying produce to the city. After the Meiji Restoration, the area was divided into Miyamae Village and Mukaoka Village within Tachibana District in the new Kanagawa Prefecture on April 1, 1889. These areas were annexed by the neighboring city of Kawasaki in 1938. The area became part of a huge government sponsored housing project from the 1950s and 1960s. In April 1972, the area became part of Takatsu Ward with the division of the city of Kawasaki into wards. In July 1982, Miyamae Ward was separated from Takatsu Ward.

== Economy ==
Miyamae Ward is largely a regional commercial center and bedroom community for central Kawasaki and Tokyo.

== Transportation ==
=== Rail ===
- Tokyu Corporation – Tōkyū Den-en-toshi Line / Tōkyū Ōimachi Line
  - Miyazakidai - Miyamaedaira - Saginuma

=== Road ===
- Tōmei Expressway
- Japan National Route 246 (Atsugi-Oyama Road, as "Atsugi-Kaido" (厚木街道) or "Oyama-Kaido" (大山街道))
- National Route 466 (No. 3 Keihin Road, as "Daisan-Keihin" (第三京浜))
- Kanagawa Prefectural Road 13
- Kanagawa Prefectural Road 45

== Local attractions ==
- Streetcar & Bus Museum

== Education ==
- St. Marianna University School of Medicine

The Kawasaki City Board of Education (川崎市育委員会) operates municipal elementary and junior high schools.

Municipal junior high schools:

- Arima (有馬中学校)
- Inukura (犬蔵中学校)
- Miyamaedaira (宮前平中学校)
- Miyazaki (宮崎中学校)
- Mukaigaoka (向丘中学校)
- Nogawa (野川中学校)
- Sugao (菅生中学校)
- Taira (平中学校)

Municipal elementary schools:

- Arima (有馬小学校)
- Fujimidai (富士見台小学校)
- Hiebara (稗原小学校)
- Inukura (犬蔵小学校)
- Minami Nogawa (南野川小学校)
- Miyamaedaira (宮前平小学校)
- Miyazaki (宮崎小学校)
- Miyazakidai (宮崎台小学校)
- Mukaigaoka (向丘小学校)
- Nishi Arima (西有馬小学校)
- Nishi Nogawa (西野川小学校)
- Nogawa (野川小学校)
- Saginuma (鷺沼小学校)
- Shirahatadai (白幡台小学校)
- Sugao (菅生小学校)
- Taira (平小学校)
- Tsuchihashi (土橋小学校)

== Noted people from Miyamae Ward ==
- Becky (television personality), actress
- Ao Tanaka, professional soccer player
- Takayuki Morimoto, professional soccer player
- Aya Kiguchi, model
- Yūji Oda, actor
- Tabea Nothegger, model
