= National University of Education station =

Station of the Daegu Metro

128 교대 National University of Education
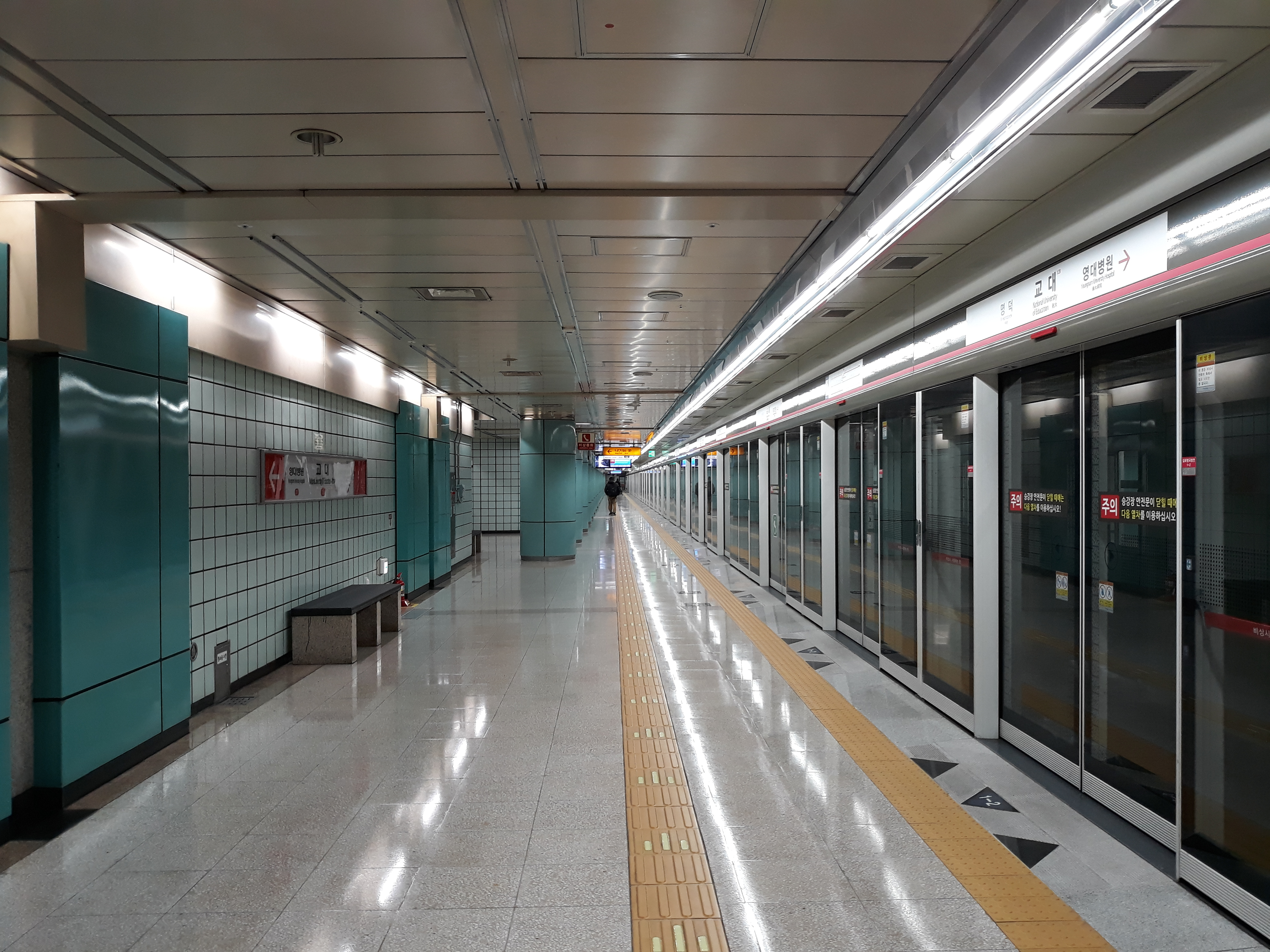
- Station platform

Korean name
- Hangul: 교대역
- Hanja: 敎大驛
- Revised Romanization: Gyodaeyeok
- McCune–Reischauer: Kyodaeyŏk

General information
- Other names: Gyodae
- Location: Daemyeong-dong, Nam District, Daegu; South Korea
- Coordinates: 35°51′04″N 128°35′26″E
- Operator: Daegu Transportation Corporation
- Line: Line 1
- Platforms: 2
- Tracks: 2

Construction
- Structure type: Underground

Other information
- Station code: 128

History
- Opened: November 26, 1997
- Former names: Yeongseon

Services
Preceding station	Daegu Metro	Following station
Yeungnam University Hospital towards Seolhwa–Myeonggok	Line 1	Myeongdeok towards Hayang
Location

National University of Education Station (aka Gyodae Station) is an underground station of Daegu Subway Line 1 in Daemyeong-dong, Nam District, Daegu, South Korea. It is named for Daegu National University of Education. It is the first station of a city railroad of Daegu connected with this college.

== Overview ==
During construction, the station name was Yeongseon Station. It is easily accessible since it is only about 230m away from Daegu University of Education.

It is a midnight train station on the train going up line 1, and the last train to Seolhwa Myeonggok runs until 23:55 minutes. The next morning, a train to Anseom departs from this station for the first time. When the Daegu subway fire broke out on February 18, 2003, the route between Myeongdeok and Sincheon was suspended for 8 months, and it was used as the starting point for a shuttle bus connecting the sections after the train stopped at this station.

== Station layout ==
G	Street Level
L1	Concourse	Faregates, Ticketing Machines, Station Control
L2; Platforms	Side platform, doors will open on the right
L2; Platforms	Southbound	← Line 1 toward Seolhwa–Myeonggok (Yeungnam University Hospital)
L2; Platforms	Northbound	→ Line 1 toward Hayang (Myeongdeok) →
L2; Platforms	Side platform, doors will open on the right

== See also ==
- Daegu National University of Education
