= Yeungnam University Hospital station =

Station of the Daegu Metro

127 영대병원 (영남이공대학교) Yeungnam University Hospital (Yeungnam Univ. of Science and Technology)
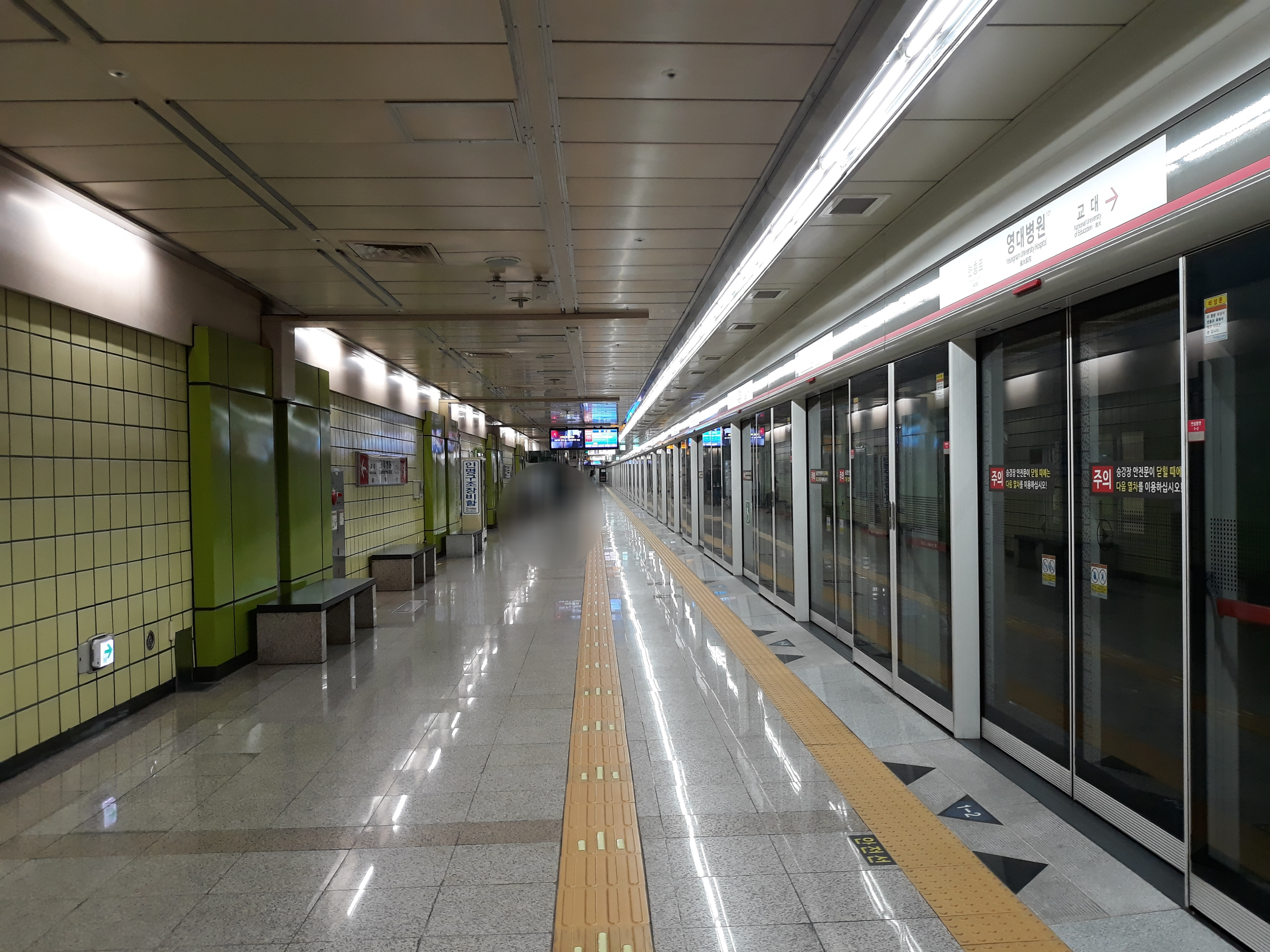
- Station platform

Korean name
- Hangul: 영대병원역
- Hanja: 嶺大病院驛
- Revised Romanization: Yeongdae-byeongwon-nyeok
- McCune–Reischauer: Yŏngdae-pyŏngwŏn-nyŏk

General information
- Location: Daemyeong-dong, Nam District, Daegu; South Korea
- Coordinates: 35°50′39″N 128°35′18″E
- Operator: Daegu Transportation Corporation
- Line: Line 1
- Platforms: 2
- Tracks: 2

Construction
- Structure type: Underground

Other information
- Station code: 127

History
- Opened: November 26, 1997

Services
Preceding station	Daegu Metro	Following station
Hyeonchungno towards Seolhwa–Myeonggok	Line 1	National University of Education towards Hayang
Location

Yeungnam University Hospital Station is a station of Daegu Subway Line 1 in Daemyeong-dong, Nam District, Daegu, South Korea. It is located near the Yeungnam University Medical Center, Myeongdeok Market, Korea Buddhism University, Daeguaneumsa Temple and Nam-gu Office.

== Station layout ==
G	Street Level
L1	Concourse	Faregates, Ticketing Machines, Station Control
L2; Platforms	Side platform, doors will open on the right
L2; Platforms	Southbound	← Line 1 toward Seolhwa–Myeonggok (Hyeonchungno)
L2; Platforms	Northbound	→ Line 1 toward Hayang (National University of Education) →
L2; Platforms	Side platform, doors will open on the right
