= Darryl Takizo Yagi =

Darryl Takizo YAGI (ヤギ・ダリル・タキゾウ, YAGI Darryl Takizō; born in 1943) is known as a school counselor, and Professor of Hyogo University of Teacher Education (HUTE: National university in JAPAN).

He graduated from University of California, Berkeley in 1965; Master of Arts degree in Counseling Psychology at California State University, Chico in 1968; and master of arts degree in Special Education at Sonoma State University in 1976.

From 1968, he worked as a school counselor at Willows Unified School District, Casa Grande High School, Old Adobe Union School District, and Petaluma Junior High School, California. From 2006, he works as a Professor of HUTE.

He is the author of "The School Counseling (スクールカウンセリング入門 アメリカの現場に学ぶ, Sukūru kaunseringu nyūmon : amerika no genba ni manabu ISBN 978-4-326-29859-4)", published by Keisō Shobō.
