= Niigata University Station =

Railway station in Niigata, Japan

Niigata University Station 新潟大学前駅
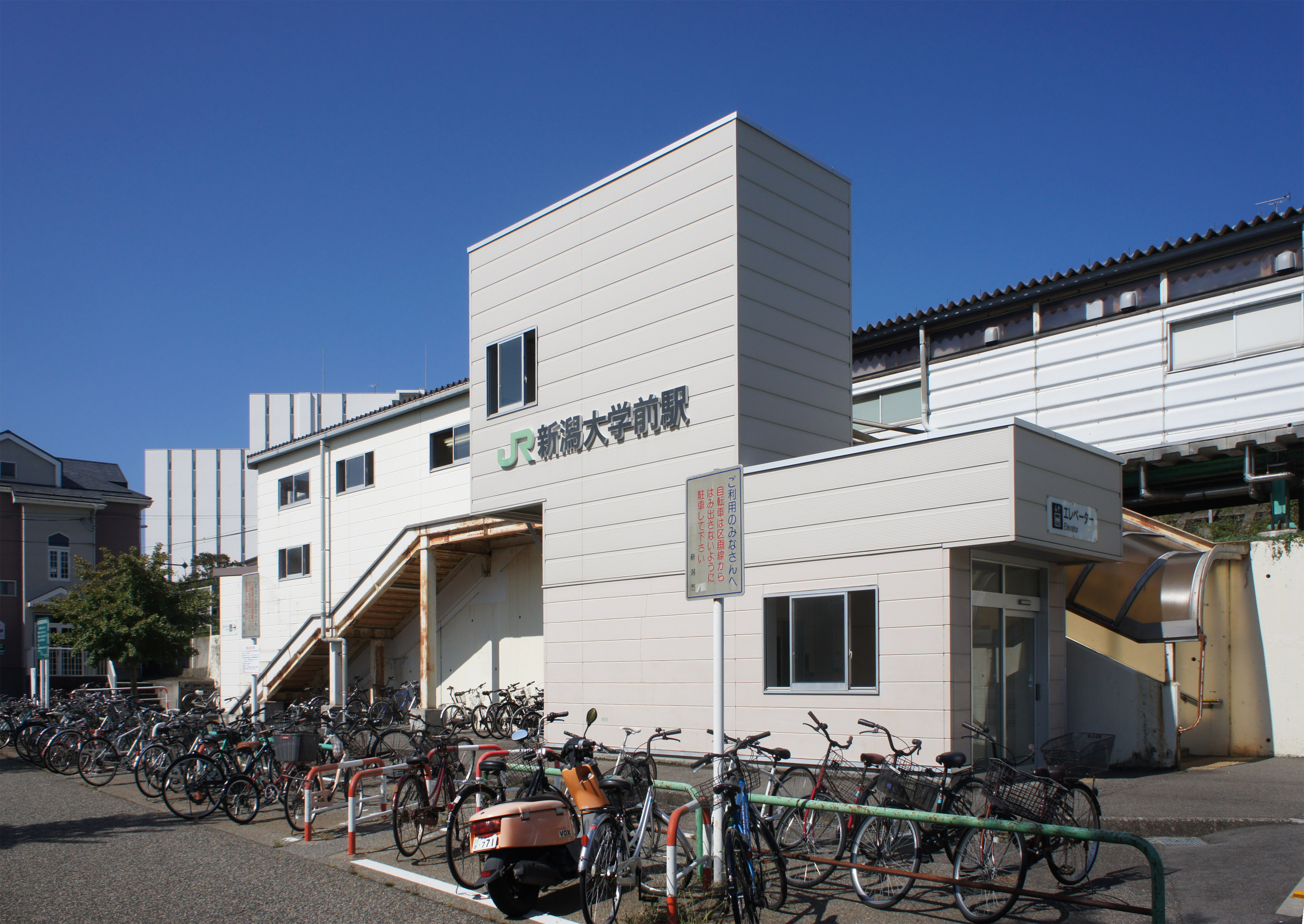
- South side of Niigata University Station in September 2021

General information
- Location: 4-15-20 Sakaisunayama, Nishi-ku, Niigata-shi, Niigata-ken 950-2044; Japan
- Coordinates: 37.8693°N 138.955°E
- Elevation: 16.6 m
- Operator: JR East
- Line: ■Echigo Line
- Distance: 72.3 km from Kashiwazaki
- Platforms: 1 side platform
- Tracks: 1

Other information
- Status: Staffed
- Website: Official website

History
- Opened: 8 April 1984
- Former names: Niigatadaigakumae

Passengers
- FY2017: 3,011 daily

Services
Preceding station	JR East	Following station
Uchino towards Kashiwazaki	Echigo Line	Terao towards Niigata
Location
- Location within JR Echigo Line Location within Japan

Niigata University Station (新潟大学前駅, Niigata Daigaku-mae-eki) is a train station on the Echigo Line in Nishi-ku, Niigata, Niigata Prefecture, Japan, operated by East Japan Railway Company (JR East).

== Lines ==
Niigata University Station is served by the Echigo Line, and is 72.3 kilometers from the starting point of the line at Kashiwazaki Station.

== Layout ==
The station consists of one ground-level side platform serving a single bi-directional track.

Suica farecard can be used at this station.

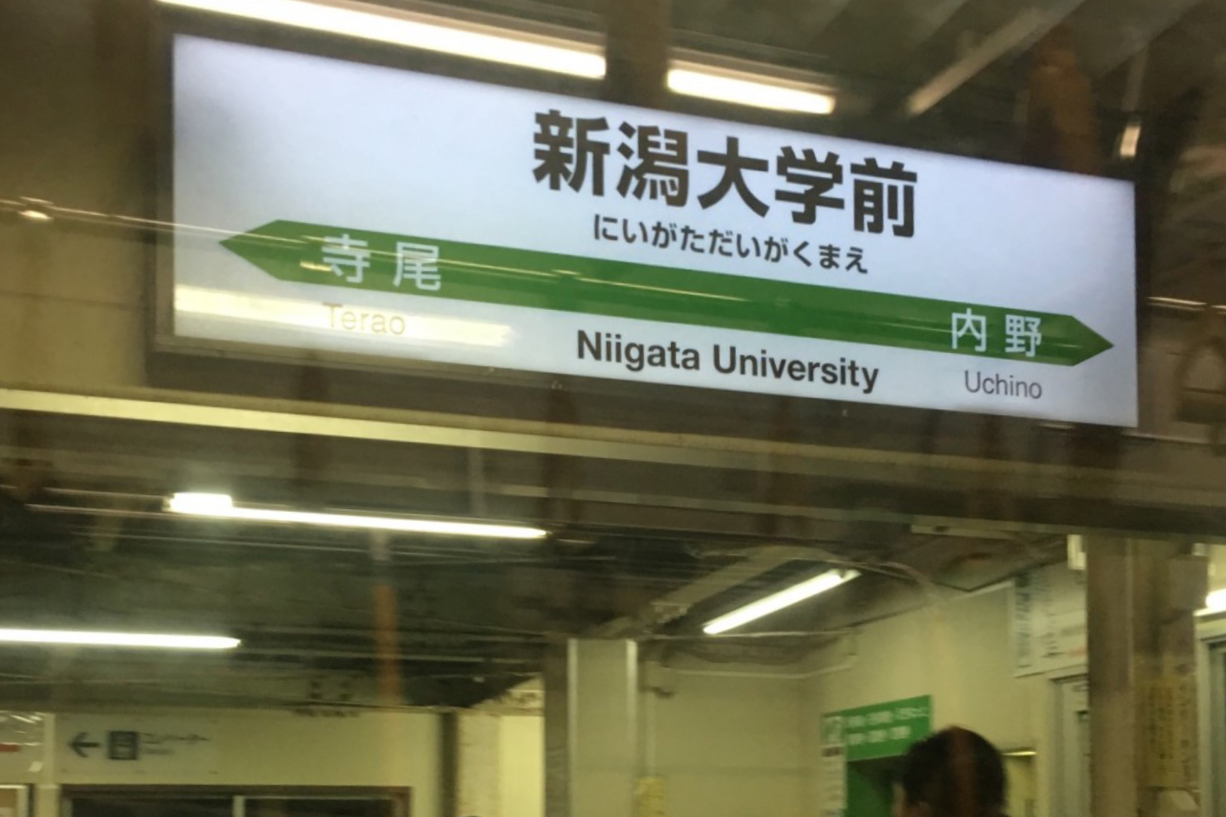
A station sign at Niigata University Station in March 2017

== History ==
The station opened on 8 April 1984. With the privatization of Japanese National Railways (JNR) on 1 April 1987, the station came under the control of JR East. In 2017 the English station name was changed from "Niigatadaigakumae" to the current "Niigata University".

== Passenger statistics ==
In fiscal 2017, the station was used by an average of 3011 passengers daily (boarding passengers only).

== Surrounding area ==
- Niigata University

== See also ==
- List of railway stations in Japan
