= Hamamatsu University School of Medicine =

Coordinates: 34.768905°N 137.742774°E

- 浜松医科大学
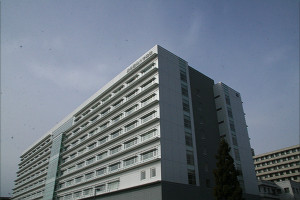
- Type: Public
- Established: 1974
- Location: Hamamatsu, Shizuoka, Japan

Hamamatsu University School of Medicine (浜松医科大学, Hamamatsu Ika Daigaku) is a national university in Hamamatsu, Shizuoka, Japan, founded in 1974.
