= St. Marianna University School of Medicine =

Japanese private medical university

Coordinates: 35.600545°N 139.548733°E

- 聖マリアンナ医科大学; Sei-marianna ika daigaku
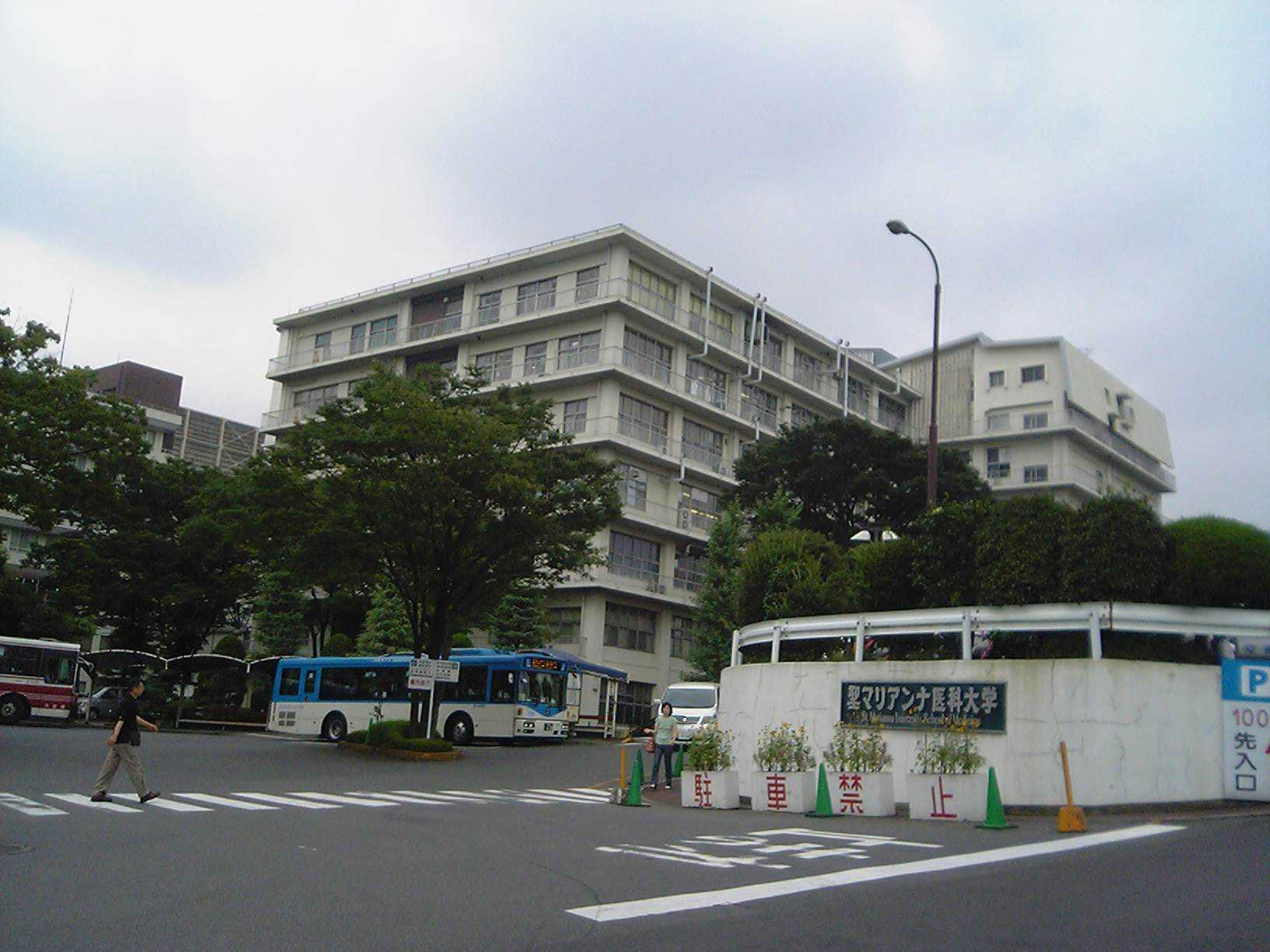
- Type: Private
- Established: 1971
- Location: Miyamae-ku, Kawasaki, Kanagawa, Japan
- Website: Official website

St. Marianna University School of Medicine (聖マリアンナ医科大学, Sei-marianna ika daigaku) is a private university in Miyamae-ku, Kawasaki, Kanagawa Prefecture, Japan.

== History ==
Established in 1971, it is a medical school affiliated with the Roman Catholic Church.

== Curriculum ==
In addition to medical studies, the school offers a degree in comparative religious studies.

== FIFA medical center ==
The school is also the first in Asia to be approved as a medical center for the FIFA world soccer association, and is the medical provider for the Japan national football team.

== Scandal ==
It has been accused of discriminating against applicants for " their age or sex," although it denies the allegations.
