= Pigment Cell & Melanoma Research =

- Discipline: Dermatology
- Language: English
- Edited by: Vijayasaradhi Setaluri

Publication details
- History: Pigment Cell Research (1987–2007), Pigment Cell & Melanoma Research (2008–present)
- Publisher: Wiley
- Frequency: Bimonthly
- Open access: Author fee
- Impact factor: 4.172 (2018)

Standard abbreviations
- ISO 4: Pigment Cell Melanoma Res.

Indexing
- ISSN: 1755-1471 (print); 1755-148X (web)

Links
- Journal homepage; Archives

Pigment Cell & Melanoma Research is a peer-reviewed scientific journal of dermatology. It is the official journal of the International Federation of Pigment Cell Societies (IFPCS) and the Society for Melanoma Research (SMR). In 2014, it ranked the 3rd most cited journal of dermatology, out of 62.

== Indexing ==
Pigment Cell & Melanoma Research is indexed in:

- Abstracts in Anthropology
- Academic Search
- Academic Search Premier
- Biochemistry & Biophysics Citation Index
- Biological Abstracts
- BIOSIS Previews
- Chemical Abstracts Service
- Current Abstracts
- Current Contents/Life Sciences
- EMBASE/Excerpta Medica
- Index Medicus/MEDLINE
- Journal Citation Reports/Science Edition
- MEDLINE/PubMed
- Research Alert
- Science Citation Index Expanded
- Science Citation Index
- SciSearch
- SCOPUS
- Zoological Record
