= Joetsu University of Education =

National university in Joetsu, Niigata, Japan

Coordinates: 37°08′13″N 138°13′29″E

- 上越教育大学
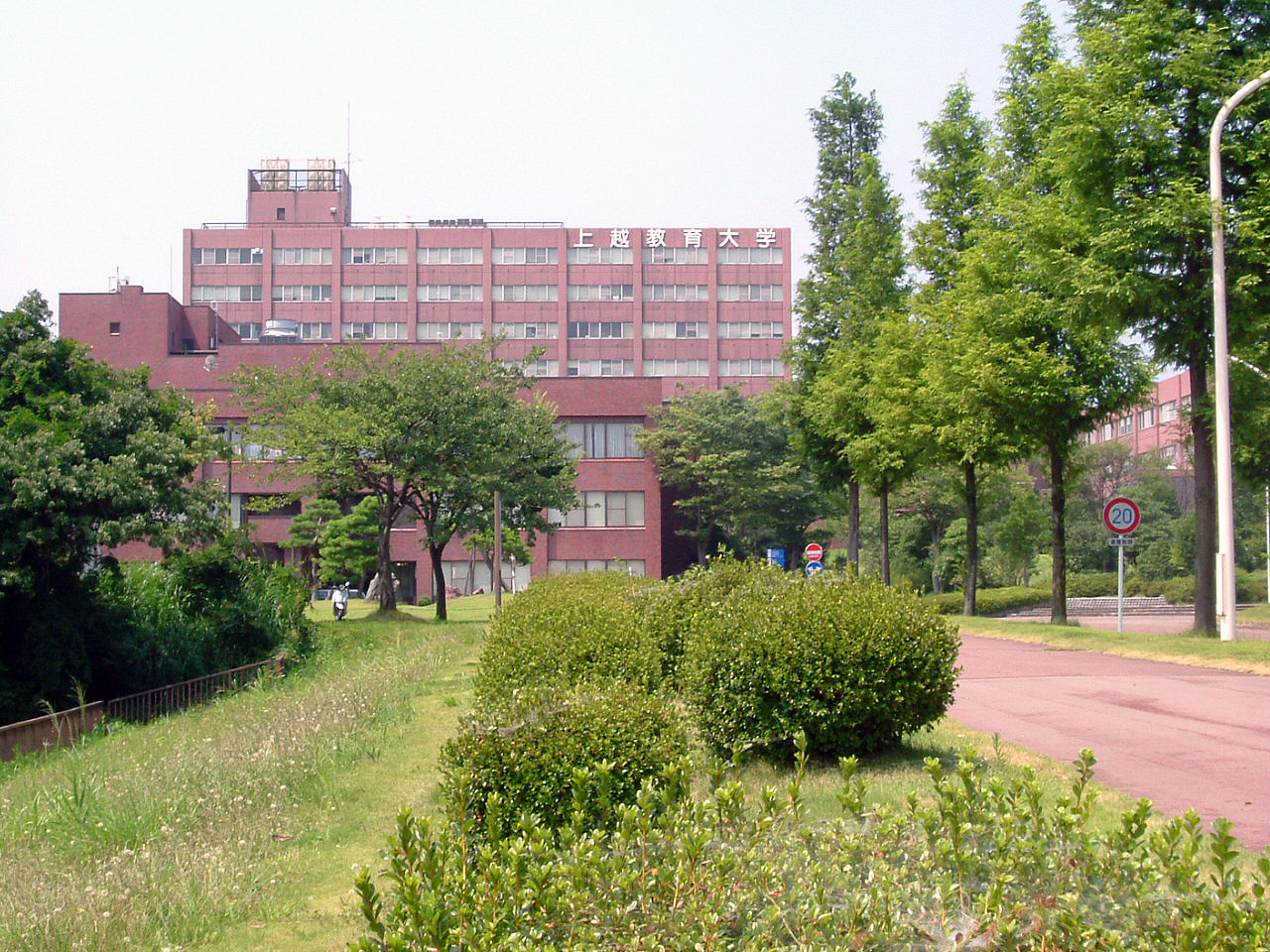
- Type: national university
- Founder: 1978
- President: Kawasaki Naoya (with 2017)
- Academic staff: 147
- Administrative staff: 101
- Students: 1327
- Location: 1, Yamayashiki-machi, Joetsu-shi, 943-8512, Japan
- Website: www.juen.ac.jp

Joetsu University of Education (上越教育大学, Jōetsu Kyōiku Daigaku) is a national university in Joetsu, Niigata, Japan, founded in 1978.
