= Daegu National University of Education =

National teachers' university in Daegu, South Korea

Coordinates: 35.8525°N 128.5885°E

- 대구교육대학교
- Other name: Daegu-gyodae (대구교대)
- Former names: Daegu Normal School (1950–1962); Kyungpook National University Attached College of Education (1962–1963); Daegu National College of Education (1963–1993)
- Motto: 슬기·보람·사랑 ("Wisdom, Fulfilment, Love")
- Type: National university of education
- Established: March 25, 1950; 76 years ago
- President: Bae Sang-sik
- Academic staff: 97 (2010)
- Students: 1,658 (2020)
- Location: 219 Jungang-daero, Nam-gu, Daegu, South Korea
- Campus: Urban
- Website: www.dnue.ac.kr

Korean name
- Hangul: 대구교육대학교
- Hanja: 大邱敎育大學校
- RR: Daegu gyoyuk daehakgyo
- MR: Taegu kyoyuk taehakkyo

Daegu National University of Education (DNUE; Korean: 대구교육대학교), commonly abbreviated as Daegu-gyodae (Korean: 대구교대), is a national university of education in Nam-gu, Daegu, South Korea. It trains teachers for public primary schools.

The school opened as Daegu Normal School on 25 March 1950. It became a two-year college of education in 1962, a four-year college in 1982, and took its current name in 1993.

== History ==
=== Background ===
After Korea's liberation in 1945, some general high schools in the province ran teacher-training departments. When teacher education was unified, these departments were closed and replaced by a provincial training institute for primary school teachers.

=== Daegu Normal School (1950–1962) ===
Daegu Normal School (대구사범학교) opened on 25 March 1950 in Daemyeong-dong. It absorbed 180 students from the provincial training institute. Its first principal was Kim Young-gi (김영기, 金永驥). The school offered a three-year main course for middle school graduates, plus one-year courses for high school students and graduates. It moved to its present site in June 1953. An attached primary school opened on 5 May 1959.

=== College of education (1962–1993) ===
On 1 March 1962, a revised Education Act required primary teachers to have higher qualifications. The normal school was reorganised as a two-year college of education attached to Kyungpook National University, with Kim Wi-seok (김위석, 金渭錫) as its first dean. On 1 March 1963 it split from Kyungpook and became Daegu National College of Education (대구교육대학).

On 1 March 1982 it became a four-year college, with an intake of 600 students. Evening and seasonal courses started in 1985.

=== University of education (1993–present) ===
The college was renamed Daegu National University of Education on 1 March 1993. The Graduate School of Education opened on 1 March 1996. A gifted education centre was set up in 2001. A multicultural education centre and an English education centre followed. A second library opened in March 2010. An undergraduate special (inclusive) education course was added in January 2012.

The university was rated top tier (grade A) in the government's 2018 evaluation of teacher-training institutions.

== Symbols ==
The university motto is "Wisdom, Fulfilment, Love" (슬기·보람·사랑). Its guiding creed is "We walk the path of the true teacher" (참된 스승의 길을 간다). The school tree is the zelkova and the school flower is the forsythia. The school song's lyrics were written by the poet Yu Chi-hwan.

== Academics ==
=== Undergraduate ===
Like South Korea's other national universities of education, DNUE has a single undergraduate major, primary education. Within it, students choose one of several specialised tracks. These include ethics, Korean language, social studies, mathematics, science, physical education, music, fine arts, practical arts, education, English, computer education, and special (inclusive) education.

=== Graduate ===
The Graduate School of Education, opened in 1996, offers master's programmes for practising teachers. Its majors cover the primary school subjects plus fields such as gifted education, early childhood education, counselling, educational technology, children's literature, school psychology, multicultural education and teaching English to young learners.

== Campus ==
The main campus is at 219 Jungang-daero in Daemyeong-dong, Nam-gu, Daegu. The university runs two attached primary schools, Daegu Attached Elementary School and Andong Attached Elementary School. It also has a teacher training institute.

Facilities include a library with an education museum, an education information centre, dormitories, a student press and broadcasting centre, a lifelong education centre, a gifted education centre, a language education centre and a multicultural education centre.

The campus is served by National University of Education Station on Daegu Metro Line 1.

== Student life ==
The university holds the Sangnok Cultural Festival (상록문화축전) every October. Its student newspaper, Daegu Gyodae Hakbo (대구교대학보), was founded in 1962.

== International exchange ==
As of the late 2010s, DNUE had exchange agreements with 38 institutions in 14 countries, including the United States, Canada, China, Japan, Taiwan, the Philippines and Vietnam. It runs student exchanges, language programmes and overseas teaching volunteer programmes.

== Presidents ==
The head of the school was called "dean" (학장) until 1994 and "president" (총장) from then on.

No.	Name	Term	Notes
1–2	Kim Wi-seok	1962 – 1973	Dean
3–4	Jang Gi-hwan	1973 – 1981	Dean
–	No Jeong-sik	1981.07.03 – 1981.07.20	Acting dean
5–6	Bae Yong-gwang	1981.07.21 – 1986.02.28	Dean
7	Kim Jong-hwan	1986.03.01 – 1990.02.28	Dean
8	Park Tae-am	1990.03.01 – 1994.02.28	Dean
9	No Jeong-sik	1994.03.01 – 1998.02.28	First president
10	Jeong Gwan	1998.03.01 – 2002.02.28	
11	Jang I-gwon	2002.03.01 – 2006.02.28	
12	Kang Hyeon-guk	2006.03.01 – 2007.07.31	
–	Hong Gi-chil	2007.08.01 – 2007.12.02	Acting president
13	Son Seok-rak	2007.12.03 – 2011.12.02	
14	Nam Seung-in	2011.12.03 – 2015	
15	Lim Cheong-hwan	2015.12.15 – 2019.12.14	
16	Park Pan-woo	2020.02.14 – 2024	
17	Bae Sang-sik	2024.02.26 – present	Term ends 2028.02.25

== See also ==
- List of national universities in South Korea
- List of universities and colleges in South Korea
- Education in South Korea
