= National University Corporation =

Type of corporate body in Japan

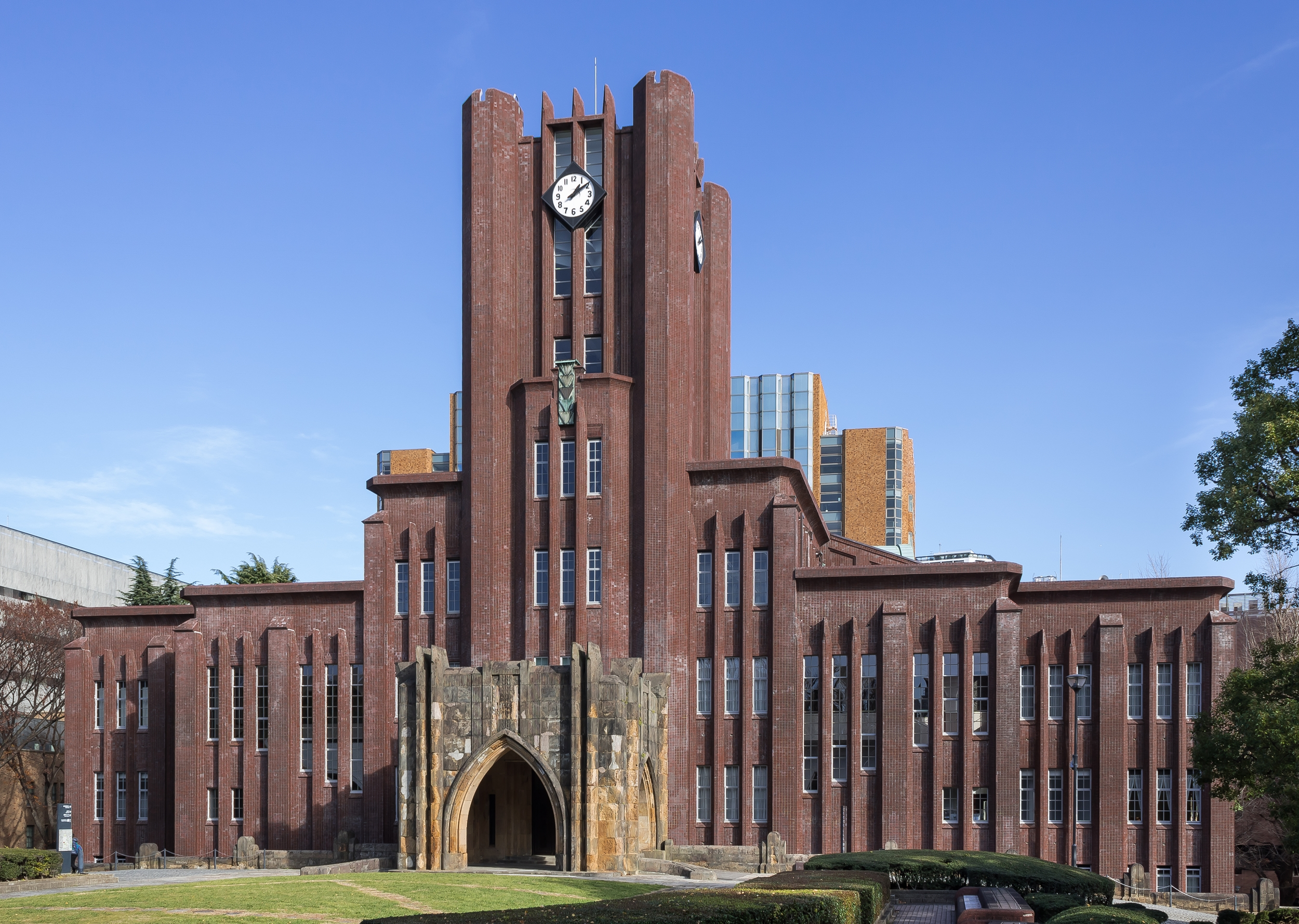
University of Tokyo Yasuda Auditorium, Shozo Uchida (1925)

A National University Corporation (国立大学法人, Kokuritsu Daigaku Hōjin) is a corporate body (legal entity) established under the provisions of the National University Corporation Act (2003) for the purpose of establishing a national university in Japan.

== History ==
As part of promoting the reform of Japanese universities, all Japanese national universities has been incorporated as a National University Corporation since 2004.

In 2018, National University Corporation Gifu University and National University Corporation Nagoya University integrated the new "Tokai National Higher Education and Research System", which became the first case of a Corporation owning two universities.

== Overview ==
The scope of business of National University Corporations is stipulated as follows by Article 22 of the National University Corporation Act.

1. Establish and operate a national university.
2. To provide students with counseling and other assistance regarding study, career selection, physical and mental health, etc.
3. Conducting research commissioned by or jointly with a person other than the National University Corporation, or conducting other educational and research activities in collaboration with a person other than the National University Corporation.
4. Opening public lectures and providing learning opportunities for other non-students.
5. To disseminate the results of research at the national university and promote its utilization.
6. To invest in a person who implements a project that promotes the utilization of the results of research on technology at the national university and that is specified by a Cabinet Order.
7. Performing business incidental to these business.

== Designated National University ==
At the 190th National Diet in 2016, the National University Corporation Act was amended and the Designated National University (指定国立大学法人) corporation system was enacted. The goal of Designated National University is to further improve the level of education and research in Japan. The selected national universities must have the highest level of education and research capabilities in Japan, and will be able to enjoy more government subsidies and more free use of funds (including larger professors salary range) in order to help attract world-class researchers.

The application requirements are:

1. The university has reached the top 10 in Japan in terms of scientific research.
2. The university has reached the top 10 in Japan in terms of social cooperation.
3. The university has reached the top 10 in Japan in terms of internationalization and international popularity.

Due to the above-mentioned strict conditions, only 10 of the 86 national universities in Japan have become the Designated National University by 2021.

List of the application and designation
Corporations	Main location	Designated day
National University Corporation Tohoku University	Sendai, Miyagi Prefecture	June 30, 2017
National University Corporation University of Tokyo	Tokyo	June 30, 2017
National University Corporation Kyoto University	Kyoto, Kyoto Prefecture	June 30, 2017
National University Corporation Tokyo Institute of Technology	Tokyo	March 20, 2018
Tokai National Higher Education and Research System Nagoya University	Nagoya, Aichi Prefecture	March 20, 2018
National University Corporation Osaka University	Suita, Osaka Prefecture	October 23, 2018
National University Corporation Hitotsubashi University	Tokyo	September 5, 2019
National University Corporation Tokyo Medical and Dental University	Tokyo	October 15, 2020
National University Corporation University of Tsukuba	Tsukuba, Ibaraki Prefecture	October 15, 2020
National University Corporation Kyushu University	Fukuoka, Fukuoka Prefecture	November 22, 2021

In addition, among the seven imperial universities that were considered the best national universities, only Hokkaido University did not become Designated National University.

== See also ==
- Tokai National Higher Education and Research System
- Imperial Universities
- List of national universities in Japan
- List of universities in Japan
- Education in Japan
- National university
