= Hyogo College of Medicine =

Coordinates: 34°43′6.2″N 135°22′44.3″E

Hyohgo Medical University (兵庫医科大学, Hyōhgo ika daigaku) is a private university in Nishinomiya, Hyōgo, Japan, established in 1972 by Shigeki Morimura.

Located near by the Koshien Stadium, it is considered to be a part of supporting medical team for high school baseball players during spring and summer.
