= Gifu University =

University in Gifu, Japan

Coordinates: 35°27′51″N 136°44′20″E

- 岐阜大学
- Motto: Learning, Exploring, Contributing
- Type: National
- Established: 1949
- Affiliations: Tokai National Higher Education and Research System
- President: Kazuhiro Yoshida
- Academic staff: 846 (2023)
- Administrative staff: 334 (May 2023) (Note: excluding Attached hospital)
- Undergraduates: 5,619 (May 2023)
- Postgraduates: 1,624 (May 2023)
- Location: Gifu, Gifu, Japan
- Website: https://www.gifu-u.ac.jp/

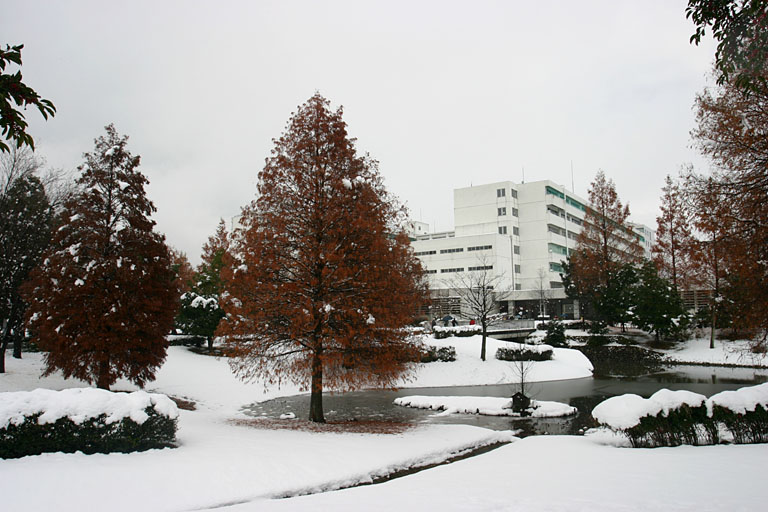
Faculty of Engineering

Gifu University (岐阜大学, Gifu Daigaku) is a national university in the city of Gifu, Gifu Prefecture, Japan. It is sometimes abbreviated as Gidai (岐大) or Gifudai (岐阜大).

== National University Corporation ==
The Tokai National Higher Education and Research System established by integrating with Nagoya University in April 2020, both are major universities in Tōkai region.

== Faculties and graduate schools ==
The following undergraduate and graduate degree programs and courses are offered on the Yanagido campus.

=== Faculties ===
- Faculty of Education
- Regional Studies
- School of Medicine
- Faculty of Engineering
- Faculty of Applied Biological Sciences
- Faculty of Social System Management

=== Graduate schools ===
- Graduate School of Education
- Graduate School of Regional Studies
- Graduate School of Medicine
- Graduate School of Engineering
- Graduate School of Science and Technology
- United Graduate School of Agricultural Science
- :Shizuoka University joined with Gifu University in establishing this united graduate school.
- Joint Graduate School of Veterinary Sciences
- :Tottori University joined with Gifu University in establishing this joint graduate school.

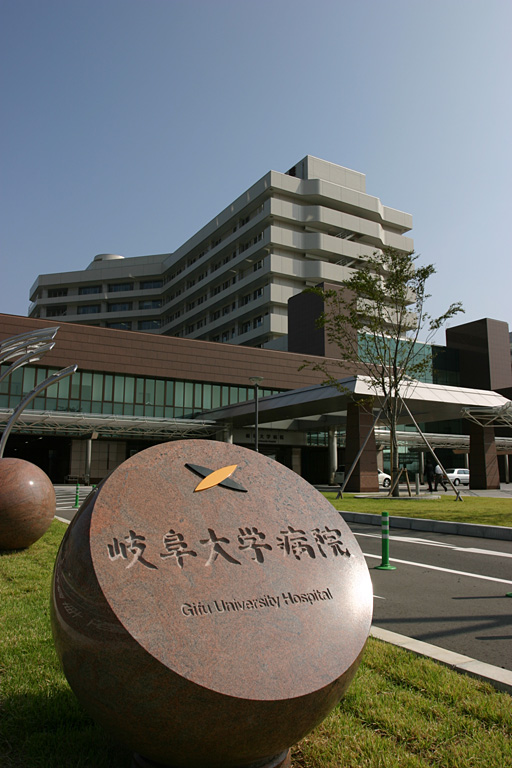
Gifu University hospital

- United Graduated School of Drug Discovery and Medical Information Science
- :Gifu Pharmaceutical University joined with Gifu University in establishing this united graduate school.

== Notable people ==
=== Business ===
- Toichi Takenaka, President and CEO of Astellas Pharma
- Fumio Sugimori, President and CEO of Toshiba Electron Tubes & Devices

=== Law and politics ===
- Kenji Manabe, Minister of the Environment (1998–1999)

=== Research ===
- Sachi Sri Kantha, Associate Professor, Gifu University

=== Other ===
- Ryoichi Akamatsu (born 1995), Japanese high jumper
- Akira Komoto, artist

== Gifu University in Asia ==
University rankings
Global
THE	General	1001-1200
QS	General	1001-1200

Regional
QS Asia (Asia version)	General	=359

According to the 2025 QS World University Rankings, Gifu University was ranked 359th in Asia and 1001-1200 in the world.

== Directions to Gifu University ==
Yanagido Campus

- JR Gifu Station or Meitetsu Gifu Station to Gifu University: 30 minutes (Gifu Bus or car)

- JR Nagoya Station to JR Gifu Station: 18 minutes (JR Tōkaidō Line)
- Meitetsu Nagoya Station to Meitetsu Gifu Station: 30 minutes (Meitetsu Nagoya Line)

- Gifu-Hashima Station (Tōkaidō Shinkansen) to Gifu University: 40 minutes (Car)
- Chūbu Centrair International Airport (nearest airport) to Meitetsu Gifu Station: 55 minutes (Meitetsu Airport Line)
