= Niigata University =

National university in Niigata, Niigata Prefecture, Japan

Coordinates: 37°52′1″N 138°56′33″E

- 新潟大学
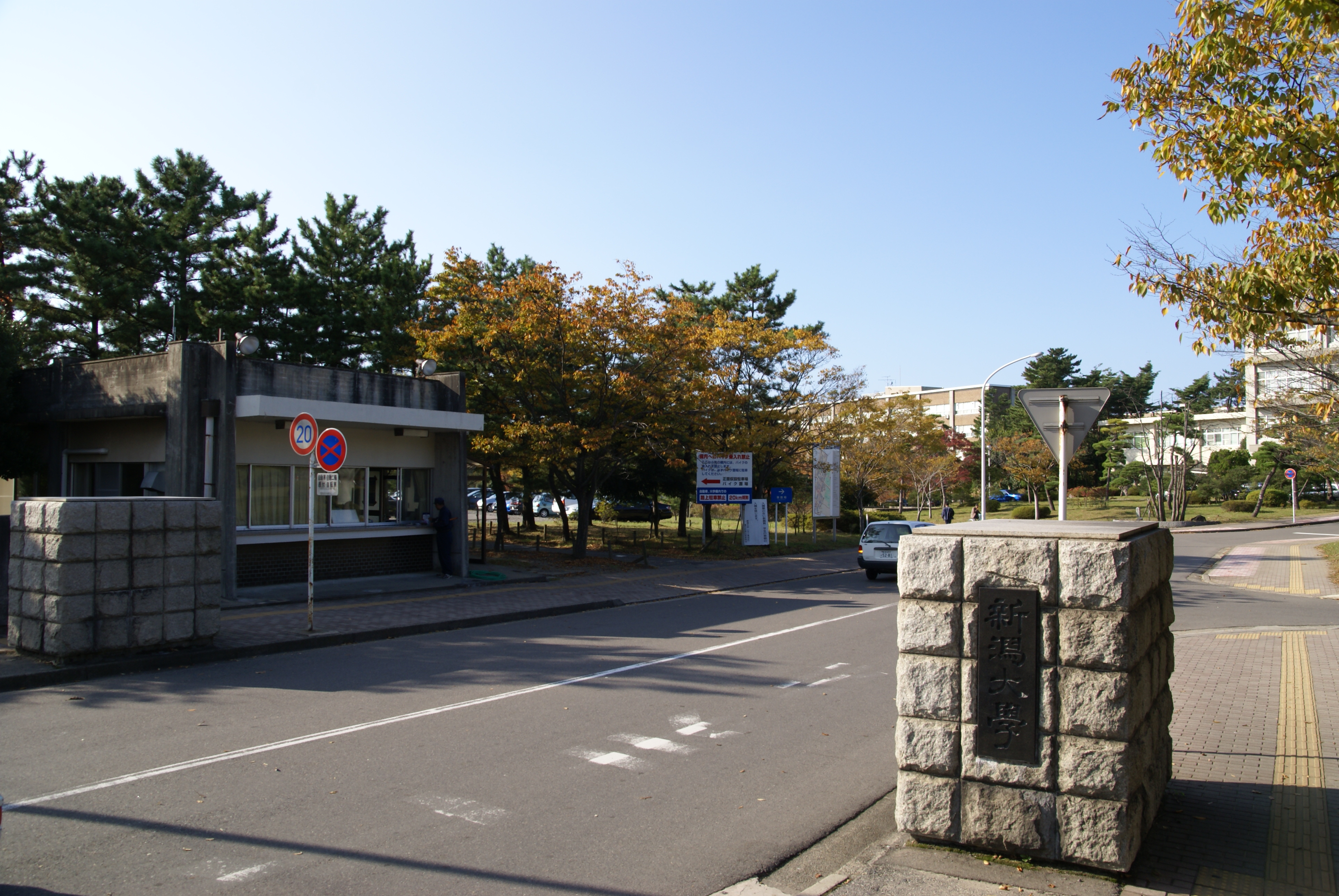
- Main gate (Ikarashi Campus)Location of Ikarashi Campus
- Type: Public (National)
- Established: Founded in 1870, chartered in 1922
- President: Tatsuo Ushiki
- Faculty: 1,535 (May 2021)
- Administrative staff: 3,267 (May 2021)
- Students: 12,173 (May 2021)
- Undergraduates: 10,102
- Postgraduates: 2,071
- Location: Niigata, Niigata, Japan
- Campus: Ikarashi(Suburban), Asahimachi(Urban), Tokimate (ときめいと, Urban)
- Website: www.niigata-u.ac.jp

Niigata University (新潟大学, Niigata daigaku) is a national university in Niigata, Niigata Prefecture, Japan. It was established in 1949 and has its major origins in Niigata Medical College (established in 1922) and in Niigata Higher School (established in 1919). It is one of the largest Japanese national universities on the Sea of Japan.

The university comprises nine faculties and seven graduate schools (as of April 2010). The student enrollment is about 12,000.

== History ==
The oldest origin of the university was Kyoritsu Hospital (a temporary hospital) founded in 1870. It was reestablished in 1873 as Private Niigata Hospital, which became a prefectural hospital in 1877.

In 1901 five national medical schools were established in Chiba, Sendai, Okayama, Kanazawa and Nagasaki. The municipal and prefectural governments of Niigata demanded a national medical school from the Ministry of Education, but the plan was deferred because of the Russo-Japanese War. Later in 1910 Niigata Medical School was founded, and the former Niigata Hospital became its clinical facility. In 1922 the medical school was chartered as Niigata Medical College (新潟醫科大學, Niigata ika daigaku).

The municipal and prefectural governments of Niigata and the local industrial firms further wanted the medical college to be developed into an imperial university (so-called Hokuriku Imperial University) and competed with Kanazawa. But the trials did not succeed until the end of World War II.

In 1949 seven colleges (Niigata Medical College, Niigata Higher School, Niigata First Normal School, Niigata Second Normal School, Niigata Youth Normal School, Niigata Prefectural Agricultural and Forestry College, and Nagaoka College of Technology) were integrated to constitute Niigata University under Japan's new educational system. The university was inaugurated with the Faculties of Humanities, Education, Science, Medicine, Engineering, and Agriculture.

University rankings

Regional – Overall
- QS Asia: =362 (2025)

In 1965 the Faculty of Dentistry was established. The faculties (except Medicine and Dentistry) began moving to new Ikarashi Campus in 1968, and the removals finished in the 1980s. In 1977 the Faculty of Humanities was reorganized into the Faculty of Law and Literature, then divided into three faculties (Humanities, Law, and Economics) in 1980. The university became a National University Corporation in 2004. In 2017, the College of Creative Studies was established.

== Organization ==
=== Undergraduate schools ===
- Faculty of Humanities
- Faculty of Education
- Faculty of Law
- Faculty of Economics
- Faculty of Science
- Faculty of Medicine
  - School of Medicine
  - School of Health Sciences
- Faculty of Dentistry
- Faculty of Engineering
- Faculty of Agriculture
- College of Creative Studies

=== Graduate schools ===
- Graduate School of Education
- Graduate School of Modern Society and Culture
- Graduate School of Science and Technology
- Graduate School of Health Sciences
- Graduate School of Medical and Dental Sciences
- Graduate School of Technology Management (professional course)

=== Centers and facilities ===
- University Library
- Niigata University Medical and Dental Hospital
- Brain Research Institute
- Center for Transdisciplinary Research
- Research Center for Natural Hazards and Disaster Recovery
- Public Collaboration Research Center
- Center for Cooperative Research
- Venture Business Laboratory
- Affiliated Schools of the Faculty of Education
  - two elementary schools, two junior high schools, one kindergarten, and a school for children with special needs
- Sado Marine Biological Station (Faculty of Science)
- Field Center for Sustainable Agriculture and Forestry (Faculty of Agriculture)
- Institute of Nephrology (Graduate School of Medical and Dental Sciences)
- Sakeology Center

== Campus ==
The faculties, graduate schools (except Medicine and Dentistry) are concentrated in Ikarashi Campus (ca. 0.6 km^{2}) to the west of the city. The medical faculties (Medicine and Dentistry) are located in Asahimachi Campus in the downtown. Attached schools (an elementary school, a junior high school and a school for children with special needs) are located in Nishi Ohata district next to Asahimachi Campus (also in Niigata City). In a building next to Niigata Station there is a small campus named Tokimate (ときめいと, former "CLLIC"), whose main purpose is to offer courses of lifelong learning for adults.

== Symbol ==
The emblem of the university is called "Rikka" (六華), a symbolized shape of a snow crystal.
