= List of botanical and zoological gardens =

The following are both botanical gardens and zoological gardens:

- Baguio Botanical Garden, also known as Botanical & Zoological Garden, in the Philippines
- Botanical and Zoological Garden of Tsimbazaza, in Antananarivo, Madagascar
- Central Florida Zoo and Botanical Gardens, near Orlando, Florida, United States
- Cincinnati Zoo and Botanical Garden, in Ohio, United States
- Fukuoka Municipal Zoo and Botanical Garden, in Fukuoka, Japan
- Hong Kong Zoological and Botanical Gardens
- Leeds Zoological and Botanical Gardens, in West Yorkshire, England
- Manila Zoo (formally the Manila Zoological and Botanical Garden), in the Philippines
- Maui Nui Botanical Gardens, in Kahului, Maui, Hawaii, United States
- Oklahoma City Zoo and Botanical Garden, in Oklahoma, United States
- Sasebo Zoological Park and Botanical Garden, in Nagasaki, Japan
- Wilhelma, in Stuttgart, Baden-Württemberg, Germany

== See also ==
- List of botanical gardens
- List of zoos
