= Kawaguchi =

Kawaguchi may refer to:

== Places ==
- Kawaguchi, Niigata, a former town in Niigata Prefecture, Japan
- Kawaguchi, Saitama, a city in Saitama Prefecture, Japan
- Kawaguchi Green Center, a city park and botanical garden located in Kawaguchi, Saitama, Japan

== Other uses ==
- Kawaguchi (surname)
- Kawaguchi Detachment, the 35th Infantry Brigade with 124th Infantry Regiment of the Imperial Japanese Army, led by Major General Kiyotaki Kawaguchi during World War II
- 7953 Kawaguchi, a main-belt asteroid discovered in 1993
- Lake Kawaguchi, a body of water in Fujikawaguchiko, Yamanashi Prefecture, Japan
- NHK Kawaguchi Transmitter, a medium-wave broadcasting station at Kawaguchi, Saitama, Japan from 1937 to 1982
- Kawaguchi Route (Shuto Expressway)
- Kawaguchi Station, a railway station on the Keihin-Tōhoku Line in Kawaguchi, Saitama Prefecture, Japan
- Nishi-Kawaguchi Station, a railway station on the Keihin-Tōhoku Line in Kawaguchi, Saitama Prefecture, Japan
- Kawaguchi, Brave New World, Ekai Kawaguchi (1866–1945), Japanese Buddhist monk; his name was used as one of the early proponents of Ectogenesis in Aldous Huxley's dystopian Brave New World.
