= Tsurumi-ku =

Tsurumi-ku (鶴見区) may refer to wards of Japan:

- Tsurumi-ku, Yokohama
- Tsurumi-ku, Osaka
