= Kiiti-ji =

Temple in Shizouka prefecture, Japan

- 帰一寺

Religion
- Affiliation: Kenchō-ji Rinzai
- Deity: Guanyin (観世音菩薩 Kanzenon Bosatsu)

Location
- Location: 39 Funada, Matsuzaki, Shizuoka, Kamo District, Shizuoka Prefecture
- Country: Japan
- Interactive map of Kiiti-ji
- Coordinates: 34°45′34.3″N 138°48′39.7″E

Architecture
- Founder: Yishan Yining
- Completed: 1301

Website
- https://kiitiji.com/

Kiiti-ji (帰一寺, Kiiti Temple) is a Rinzai Zen temple of the Kenchō-ji branch, located in Matsuzaki-chō (松崎町, Matsuzaki, Shizuoka), Kamo District, Shizuoka Prefecture, Japan. The temple was founded by Issan Ichinei (一山一寧, Yishan Yining), a Chinese Buddhist monk who traveled to Japan during the Yuan dynasty of China.

The sangō is Manpou-zan. The Ji-hō (寺宝, the temple’s treasure) of Kiiti-ji includes a portraits, a writing and two analects of Yishan Yining in the document archive. Kiiti-ji is designated as the temple 80 of the Izu 88 temple pilgrimage, and the temple 2 of Izu-yokomichi 33 temple pilgrimage.

Kiiti-ji was often used as a shooting place for television dramas and movies, like “Miyamoto Musashi” and “Crying Out Love in the Center of the World (It’s also known as Socrates in Love).”

== History ==
In the late Kamakura period, Yishan Yining, a Buddhist from the Great Yuan, founded a temple firstly called Kiiti-an (帰一庵), then the temple was renamed Kiiti-ji. In the Muromachi period, the Later Hojo-shi (北条氏, Hōjō clan) granted the land of 73 goku to Kiiti-ji. In the early Edo period (Shouhō, 1645-1648), Tokugawa shogunate recognized and assessed Kiiti-ji as the starting point of the teaching of Yishan Yining and valued for its role as a headquarter of 50 temples, Tokugawa Iemitsu granted Kiiti-ji to maintain its original territories. In 1648, Kiiti-ji was granted the land of 20 koku in Funada village and the shuin. After the Tokugawa shogunate fell in 1868, Kiiti-ji returned its territories and the shuin to the new government, but those were bought back a few years later. It is said that Hakuin Ekaku, one of the most influential figures in Japanese Zen Buddhism and so-called “the ancestor who rejuvenated the Rinzai school of Zen Buddhism in Japan,” once stayed at the temple.

== Buildings ==
According to the Keizoudokuzui, which is a book written by Hakuin Ekaku, the building sheathing Kiiti-ji’s rinzō (輪蔵, a kind of Kyōzō) was requested by Ōishi-Shichirō-Zaemon, then Ōsawa-Yoda clan took over his wish and completed the construction in 1717. Also, the book said that the statue of Goddess Benzaiten being enshrined in the building was made by Prince Shōtoku.

== Sources ==
- Kamo Gun (1973). nanzu fudo shi (南豆風土誌) (in Japanese). Kamakura: Nagakura Shoten. ASIN B000J9FMVO.
- Shirai, Eiji (1992). kamakura jiten (鎌倉事典) (in Japanese). Kamakura: tokyodo shuppan. ISBN 978-4-4901-0303-8.
- Yoshizawa, KAtsuhiro (2015). keisou dokuzui (荊叢毒蘂) (in Japanese). Kamakura: zen bunka kenkyujyo. ISBN 978-4-8818-2282-1.
