= List of botanical gardens in Japan =

This list of botanical gardens in Japan is intended to include all significant botanical gardens and arboretums in Japan.

- Akatsuka Botanical Garden (Itabashi, Tokyo)
- Aloha Garden Tateyama (Tateyama, Chiba)
- Amami Islands Botanical Garden (Amami, Kagoshima)
- Aoshima Subtropical Botanical Garden (Miyazaki, Miyazaki)
- Aritaki Arboretum (Koshigaya, Saitama)
- Atagawa Tropical & Alligator Garden (Kamo, Shizuoka)
- Botanic Garden, Faculty of Science, Kanazawa University (Kanazawa, Ishikawa)
- Botanical Garden of Tohoku University (Sendai, Miyagi)
- Botanic Gardens of Toyama (Toyama, Toyama)
- Botanical Gardens Faculty of Science Osaka City University (Katano, Osaka)
- Enoshima Tropical Plants Garden (Fujisawa, Kanagawa)
- Experimental Station for Landscape Plants (Chiba, Chiba)
- Fuji Bamboo Garden (Nagaizumi, Shizuoka)
- Fukuoka Municipal Zoo and Botanical Garden (Fukuoka, Fukuoka)
- Futagami Manyo Botanical Gardens (Takaoka, Toyama)
- Hakone Botanical Garden of Wetlands (Hakone, Kanagawa)
- Handayama Botanical Garden (Okayama, Okayama)
- Hattori Ryokuchi Arboretum (Toyonaka, Osaka)
- Higashiyama Zoo and Botanical Gardens (Nagoya, Aichi)
- Himeji City Tegarayama Botanical Garden (Himeji, Hyōgo)
- Himi Seaside Botanical Garden (Himi, Toyama)
- Hiroshima Botanical Garden (Hiroshima, Hiroshima)
- Hirugano Botanical Garden (Gujō, Gifu)
- Hokkaido University Botanic Garden (Sapporo, Hokkaidō)
- Ibaraki Botanical Garden (Naka, Ibaraki)
- Ibusuki Experimental Botanical Garden (Ibusuki, Kagoshima)
- Ishikawa Forest Experiment Station (Hakusan, Ishikawa)
- Itabashi Botanical Garden (Itabashi, Tokyo)
- Jindai Botanical Garden (Chōfu, Tokyo)
- Kagoshima Botanical Garden (Kagoshima, Kagoshima)
- Kanagawa Prefectural Ofuna Botanical Garden (Kamakura, Kanagawa)
- Kawaguchi Green Center (Kawaguchi, Saitama)
- Kiseki No Hoshi Greenhouse (Awaji, Hyōgo)
- Kitayama Botanical Garden (Nishinomiya, Hyōgo)
- Kobe Municipal Arboretum (Kōbe, Hyōgo)
- Koishikawa Botanical Gardens (Bunkyō, Tokyo)
- Kosobe Conservatory (Takatsuki, Osaka)
- Kubota Palm Garden (Masaki, Ehime)
- Kyoto Botanical Garden (Kyoto, Kyoto)
- Makino Botanical Garden (Kōchi, Kōchi)
- Manyo Botanical Garden, Nara (Nara, Nara)
- Michinoku Mano-Manyo Botanical Garden (Kashima, Fukushima)
- Mito Municipal Botanical Park (Mito, Ibaraki)
- Miyajima Natural Botanical Garden (Hatsukaichi, Hiroshima)
- Miyakojima City Tropical Plant Garden (Miyakojima, Okinawa)
- Mizunomori Water Botanical Garden (Kusatsu, Shiga)
- Nagai Botanical Garden (Osaka, Osaka)
- Nagasaki Subtropical Botanical Garden (Nagasaki, Nagasaki)
- Niigata Prefectural Botanical Garden (Niigata, Niigata)
- Nikko Botanical Garden (Nikkō, Tochigi)
- Nunobiki Herb Garden (Kōbe, Hyōgo)
- Omoro Botanical Garden (Motobu, Okinawa)
- Rokkō Alpine Botanical Garden (Kōbe, Hyōgo)
- Sakuya Konohana Kan (Osaka, Osaka)
- Samuel Cocking Garden (Enoshima)
- Sasebo Zoological Park and Botanical Garden (Sasebo, Nagasaki)
- Seinan Gakuin University Biblical Botanical Garden (Fukuoka, Fukuoka)
- Shimokamo Tropical Botanical Gardens (Kamo, Shizuoka)
- Shimizu_Park (Noda, Chiba)
- Southeast Botanical Gardens (Okinawa, Okinawa)
- Suigō Sawara Aquatic Botanical Garden (Katori, Chiba)
- Suma Rikyu Park (Kōbe, Hyōgo)
- Tajima Plateau Botanical Gardens (Kami, Hyōgo)
- Tama Forest Science Garden (Hachiōji, Tokyo)
- Tennōji Botanical Garden (Osaka, Osaka)
- Tokyo University of Agriculture Botanical Garden (Atsugi, Kanagawa)
- Tropical & Subtropical Arboretum (Kunigami, Okinawa)
- Tsukuba Botanical Garden (Tsukuba, Ibaraki)
- Wakayama Prefecture Botanical Park (Iwade, Wakayama)
- Yamashina Botanical Research Institute (Kyoto, Kyoto)
- Yokohama Municipal Children's Botanical Garden (Yokohama, Kanagawa)
- Yumenoshima Tropical Greenhouse Dome (Kōtō, Tokyo)

== See also ==
- List of botanical gardens
