= Yamashina =

Yamashina may refer to:

- Yamashina Botanical Research Institute, Kyoto, Japan
- Yamashina Institute for Ornithology
- Yamashina Mido, a Buddhist temple in Kyoto, Japan
- Yamashina Oyakata, an elder name in sumo currently held by Toyohibiki Ryūta
- Yamashina Station, in Kyoto, Japan
- Yamashina-ku, Kyoto, a ward in the city
- Yamashina-no-miya (山階) ōke (princely house), a branch of the Japanese Imperial Family
- Yoshimaro Yamashina (山階 芳麿) (1900–1989), Japanese ornithologist
