= Experimental Station =

There are numerous experimental stations all over the world. Some of them include:

- DuPont Experimental Station
- Seaplane Experimental Station
- Rothamsted Experimental Station
- Air Ministry Experimental Station
- Cold Spring Harbor Laboratory
- Experimental Station for Landscape Plants
- UC Citrus Experiment Station
- Agricultural experiment station
- New York State Agricultural Experiment Station
- Marine Aircraft Experimental Station
- Pavlovsk Experimental Station
- Tesla Experimental Station
- Tocklai Experimental Station
