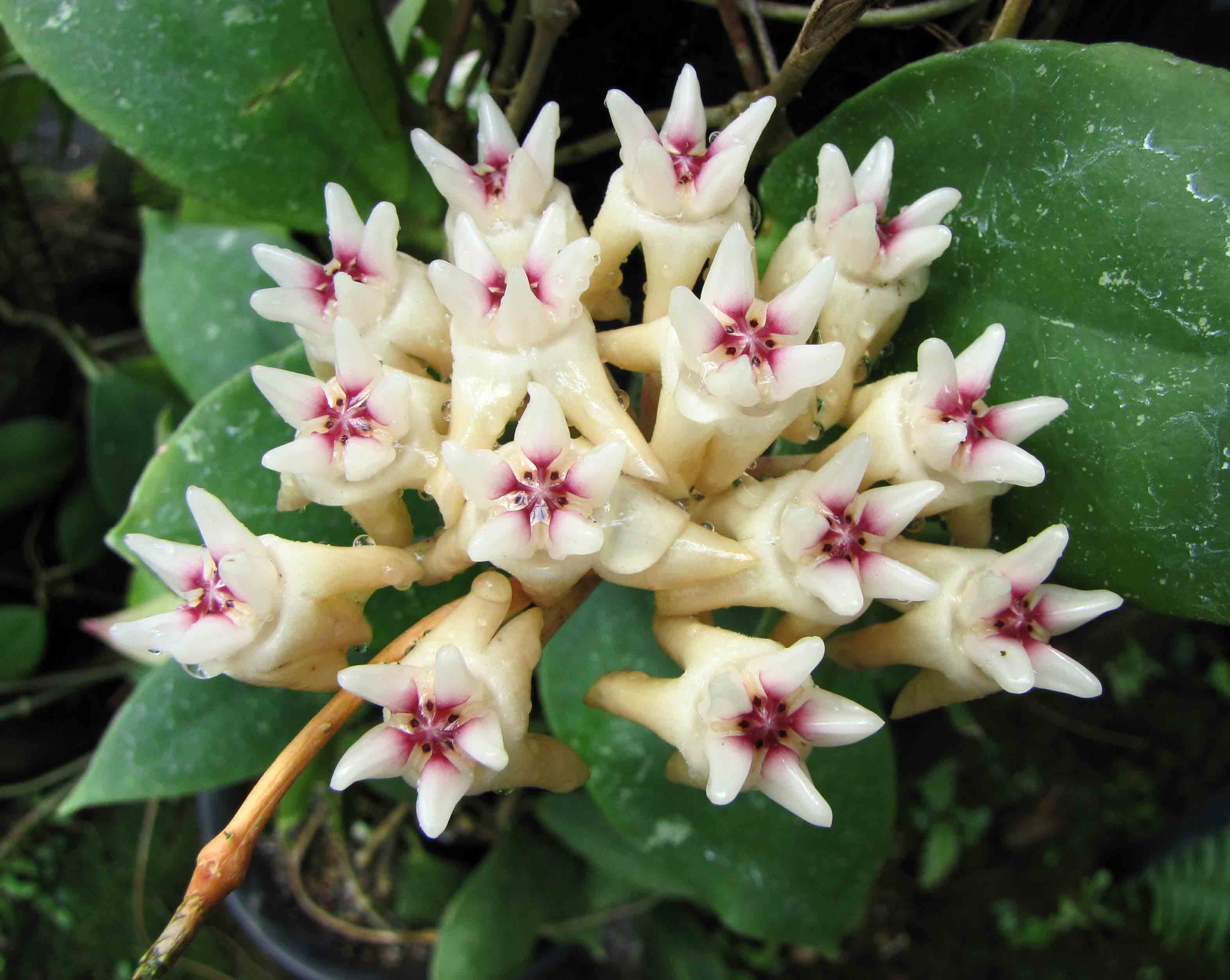
- At Sakuya Konohana Kan

Scientific classification
- Kingdom: Plantae
- Clade: Tracheophytes
- Clade: Angiosperms
- Clade: Eudicots
- Clade: Asterids
- Order: Gentianales
- Family: Apocynaceae
- Genus: Hoya
- Species: H. mitrata

Binomial name
- Hoya mitrata Kerr

Synonyms
- Hoya darwinii Loher; Hoya wallichiana Decne.

= Hoya mitrata =

Species of plant

Hoya mitrata is a widespread species of flowering plant in the family Apocynaceae. It is native to southern Thailand, Peninsular Malaysia, Sumatra, Borneo, and the Philippines. A climbing epiphyte or lithophyte, it is typically found in the wet tropical biome. It has two types of leaves, with one type forming myrmecodomatia for the ants it hosts.
