= Miyajima Natural Botanical Garden =

Botanical garden in Hiroshima, Japan

Coordinates: 34°16′59.4″N 132°17′17.6″E

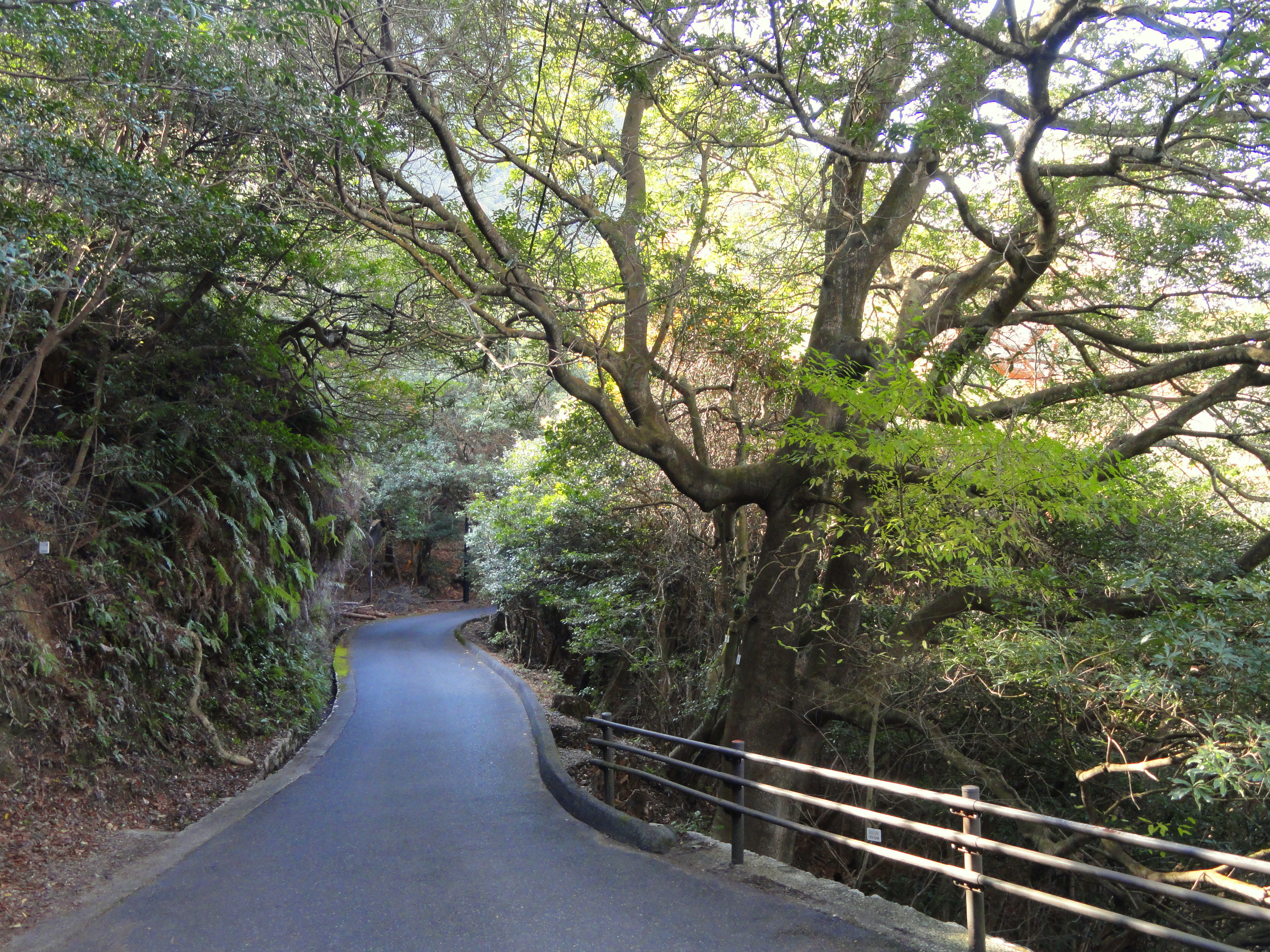
Miyajima Natural Botanical Garden

The Miyajima Natural Botanical Garden (宮島自然植物実験所, Miyajima Shizen Shokubutsu Jikkensho; 11.5 hectares) is a botanical garden operated by Hiroshima University and located at Mitsumaruko-yama 1156-2, Miyajima-cho, Hatsukaichi, Hiroshima, Japan. It is open daily except New Years and August; admission is free.

The garden was established in 1964 for botanical research and education. It is located on the north coast of Miyajima (Itsukushima) Island about 20 km from Hiroshima City. The island forms part of the Setonaikai National Park and contains the Misen forest, a World Heritage Site.

Most of the garden consists of natural forest and maritime vegetation, particularly subtropical species and halophytes, with about 350,000 specimens in its herbarium. Current research projects include studies of local vascular and non-vascular plants, especially bryophytes; ecology; and conservation biology.

== See also ==
- List of botanical gardens in Japan
