= Ishikawa Forest Experiment Station =

Arboretum and botanical garden in Hakusan, Ishikawa, Japan

Coordinates: 36°25′45″N 136°38′34″E

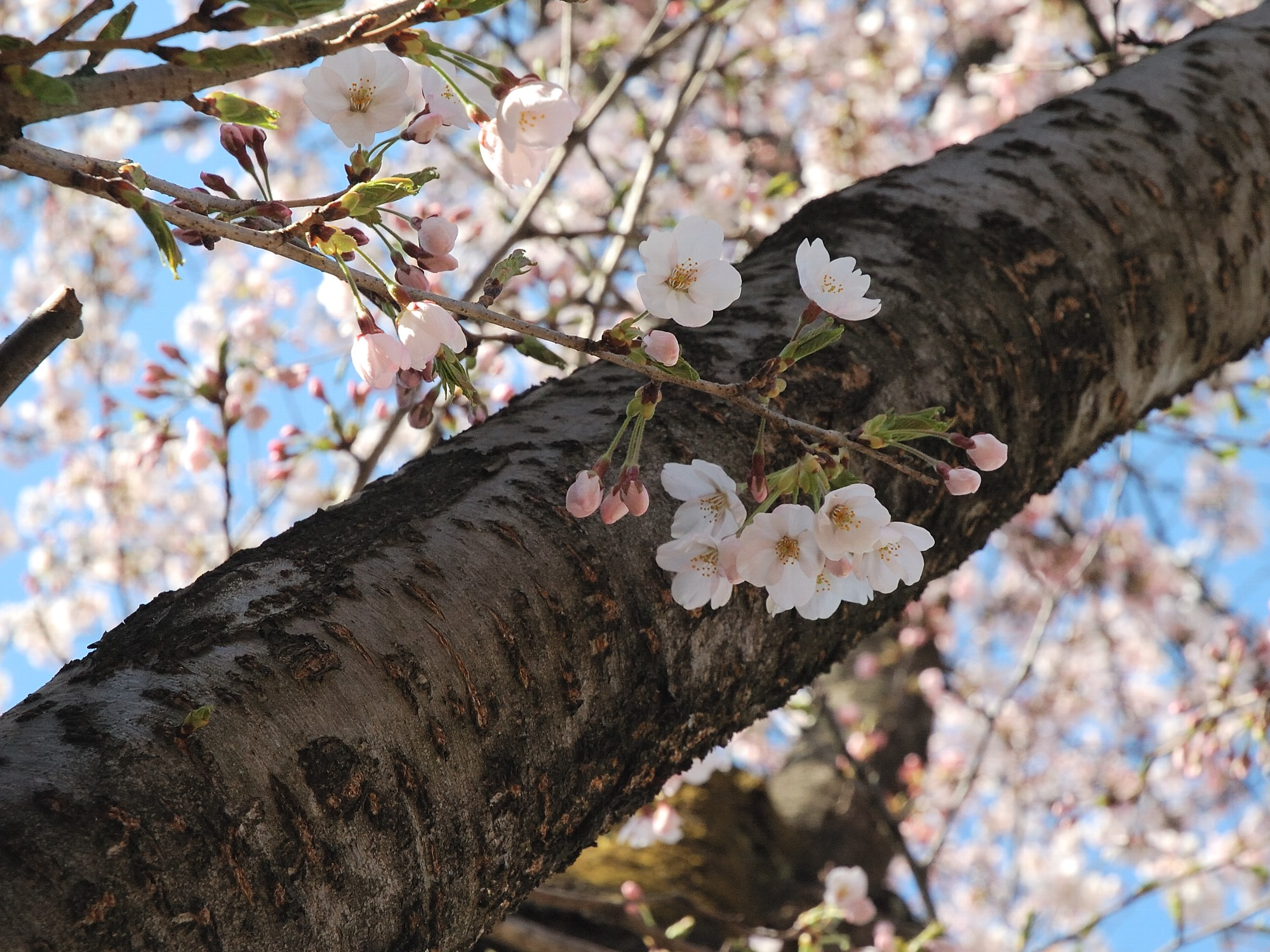

The Ishikawa Forest Experiment Station (石川県林業試験場, Ishikawa-ken Ringyōshikenjō; 44 hectares) is an arboretum and botanical garden located at Ho-1 Banchi, Sannomiya-machi, Hakusan, Ishikawa, Japan. It is open daily; admission is free.

The arboretum contains almost 800 species (15,000 trees and shrubs) in areas including an azalea garden, camellia garden, cherry trees, experimental areas, Japanese garden, playground, wetlands, etc. Collections include Acer palmatum var. matsumurae, Aesculus turbinata, Benthamidia japonica, Camellia sasanqua, Castanopsis cuspidata var. Sieboldii, Cercidiphyllum japonicum, Corylopsis spicata, Fagus crenata Blume, Forsythia suspensa, Gardenia augusta, Hamamelis japonica, Hypericum patulum Thunb., Juglans mandshurica var. Sachalinensis, Liriodendron tulipifera L., Magnolia kobus, Metasequoia glyptostroboides, Prunus mume, Quercus myrsinaefolia, Spiraea thunbergii, Stewartia pseudocamellia, Styrax obassia, Taxodium distichum, Viburnum plicatum var. Plicatum, Weigela hortensis (Sieb. et Zucc.) K. Koch, etc.

== See also ==
- List of botanical gardens in Japan
