= Ibusuki Experimental Botanical Garden =

Botanic garden in Kagoshima, Japan

Coordinates: 31.251256°N 130.638288°E

The Ibusuki Experimental Botanical Garden (指宿植物試験場, Ibusuki Shokubutsu Shikenjō; 3.88 hectares) is a botanical garden operated by the Faculty of Agriculture, Kagoshima University. It is located at 1291 Ju-cho, Ibusuki, Kagoshima, Japan.

The garden contains useful plants of tropical and subtropical origin for student education and genetic conservation. Its site is of particular interest due to its mild climate and abundant supply of hot spring water from nearby volcanic activities.

== See also ==
- List of botanical gardens in Japan
