= Kanagawa Prefectural Ofuna Botanical Garden =

Botanical garden in Kanagawa, Japan

Coordinates: 35°20′53″N 139°31′15″E

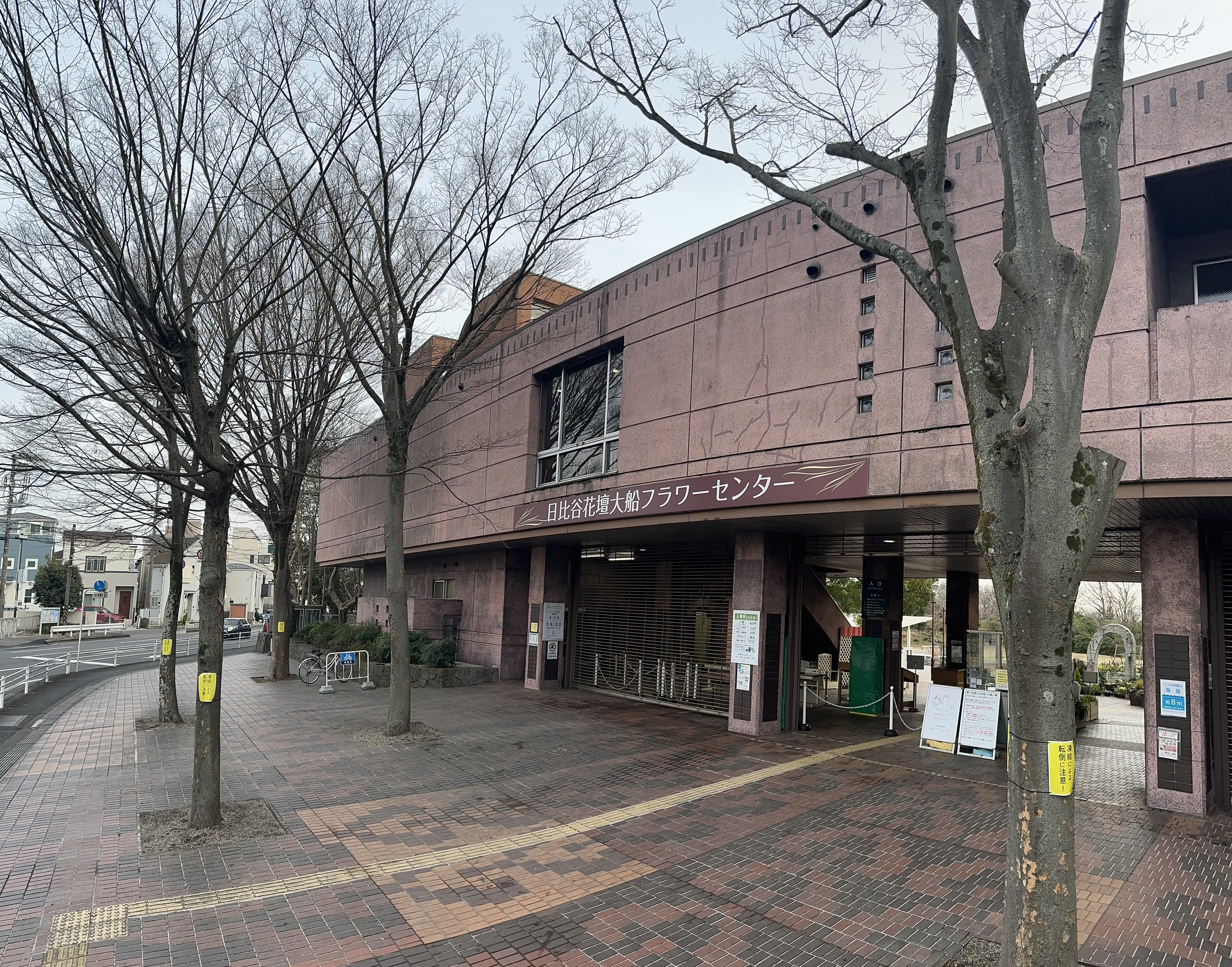
Kanagawa Prefectural Flower Center Ofuna Botanical Garden, 2023.

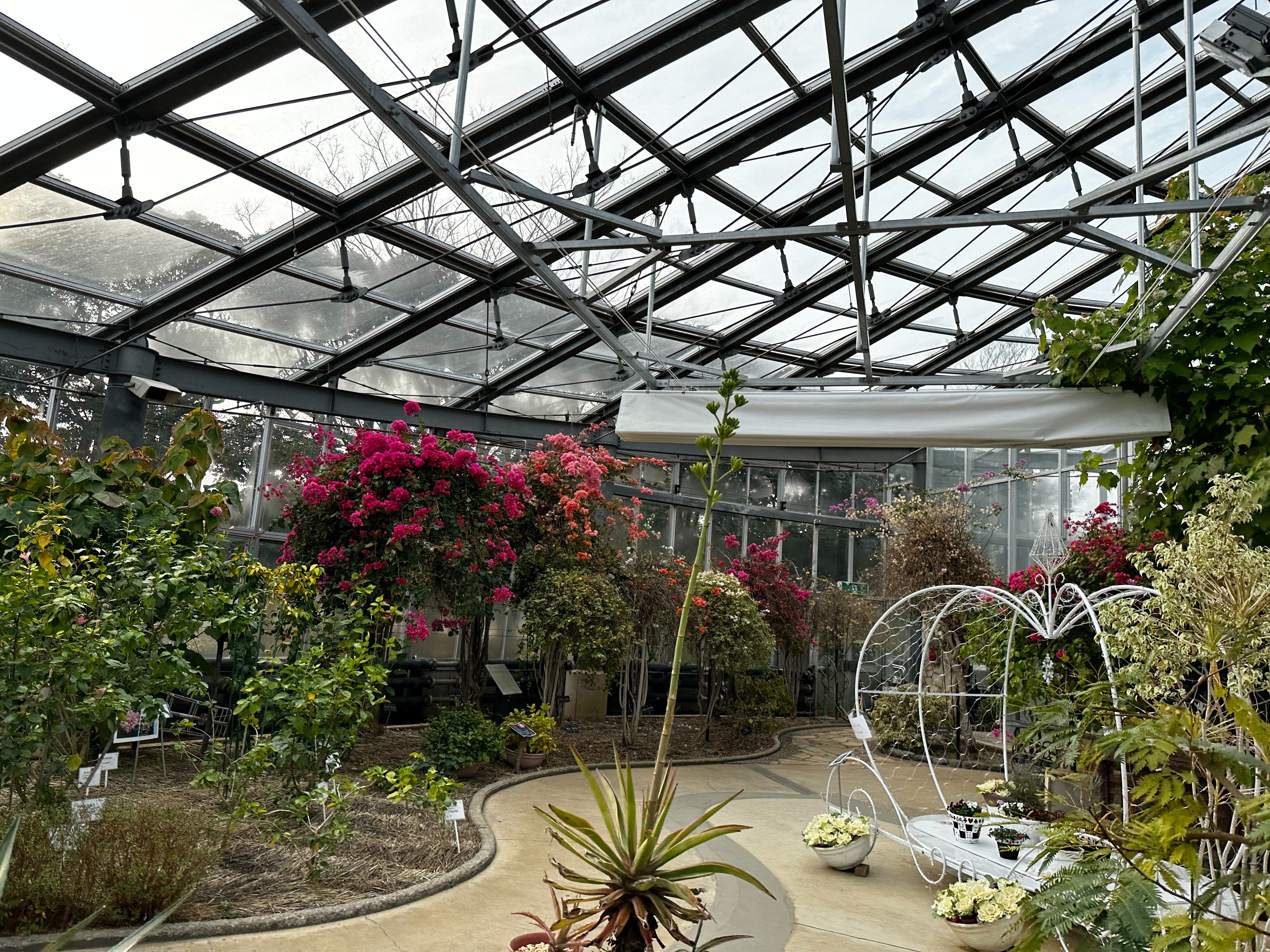
Inside the onsite green house, 2023

The Kanagawa Prefectural Ofuna Botanical Garden (神奈川県立フラワーセンター 大船植物園, Kanagawa Kenritsu Furawāsentā Ōfuna Shokubutsuen) is a botanical garden located at 1018 Okamoto, Kamakura, Kanagawa, Japan. It is open daily except Mondays; an admission fee is charged.

The garden was founded in 1961 as the Prefectural Flower Center Ofuna Botanical Garden on a former site of the Kanagawa National Agricultural Experiment Stations. It currently contains about 5,700 species with notable collections of Azalea, Camellia, Iris kaempferi, Paeonia suffruticosa, Paeonia lactiflora, and Selaginella tamariscina.

== See also ==
- List of botanical gardens in Japan
