= Handayama Botanical Garden =

Botanical garden in Okayama, Japan

- 岡山市半田山植物園
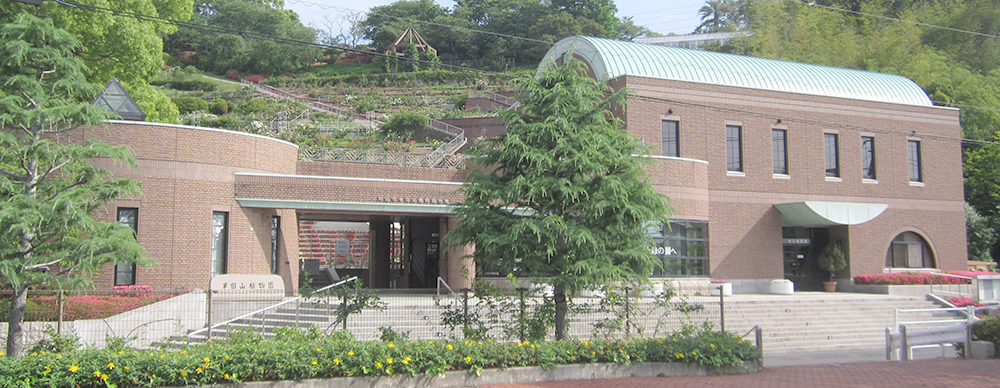
- Handayama Botanical Garden
- Interactive map of Handayama Botanical Garden
- Type: Botanical garden
- Location: Kita-ku, Okayama, Japan
- Coordinates: 34°41′30″N 133°55′55″E
- Created: May 1964
- Website: www.okayama-park.or.jp/handayama/

The Handayama Botanical Garden (岡山市半田山植物園, Okayama-shi Handayama Shokubutsuen) is a botanical garden located at 2-1319 Kitagata, Kita-ku, Okayama, Japan. It is open daily except Tuesdays; an admission fee is charged.

The garden was founded in 1953 on a hillside site overlooking the city by the Okayama Waterworks. It was remodeled and reopened under its present name in May 1964. The park covers an area of 110,000 square meters (1,200,000 sq ft), and has 150,000 plants of 3,200 species blooming throughout the four seasons, including good collections of camellias and maples. Near the summit is the Ipponmatsu Kofun, an ancient burial mound

== See also ==
- List of botanical gardens in Japan
- Korakuen Garden (nearby)
