= Kitayama Botanical Garden =

Botanical garden in Hyōgo, Japan

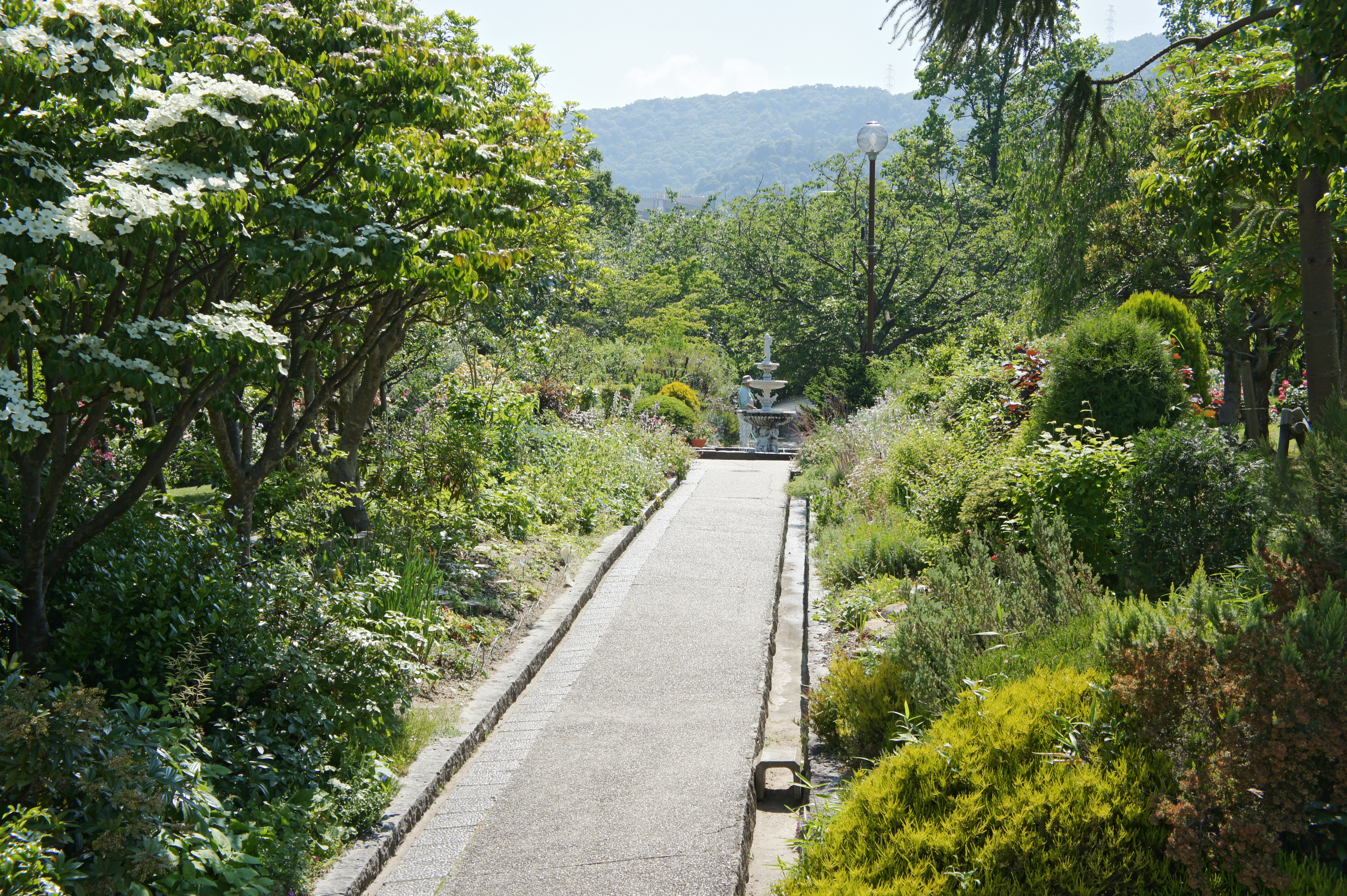
- Kitayama Botanical Garden

- Location within Japan
- Type: Botanical garden
- Location: 1-1 Kitayamacho, Nishinomiya, Hyōgo, Japan
- Coordinates: 34°45′53.1″N 135°19′1.6″E
- Opened: 1982
- Website: https://www.nishi.or.jp/kotsu/kankyo/hanatomidori/shokubutsuen/

The Kitayama Botanical Garden (北山緑化植物園, Kitayama Ryokka Shokubutsuen), sometimes called the Nigawa Botanical Garden, is a botanical garden located at 6-14-15 Nigawa-cho, Nishinomiya, Hyōgo, Japan. It opened in 1982 and has a total area of 9 hectares. The garden is next to Kabutoyama Forest Park at Mount Kabutoyama, and contains a greenhouse, flower collections, and cherry trees.

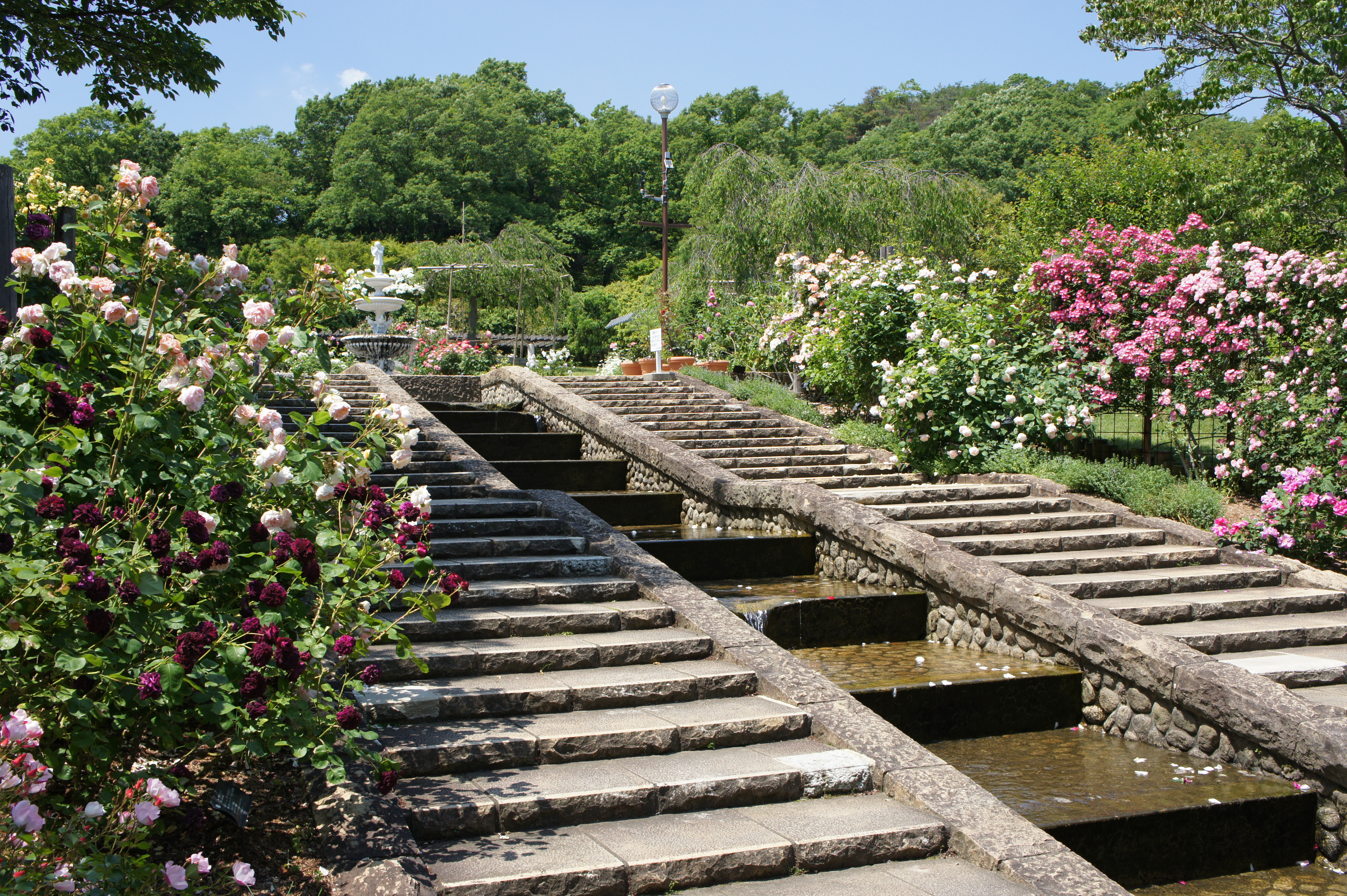

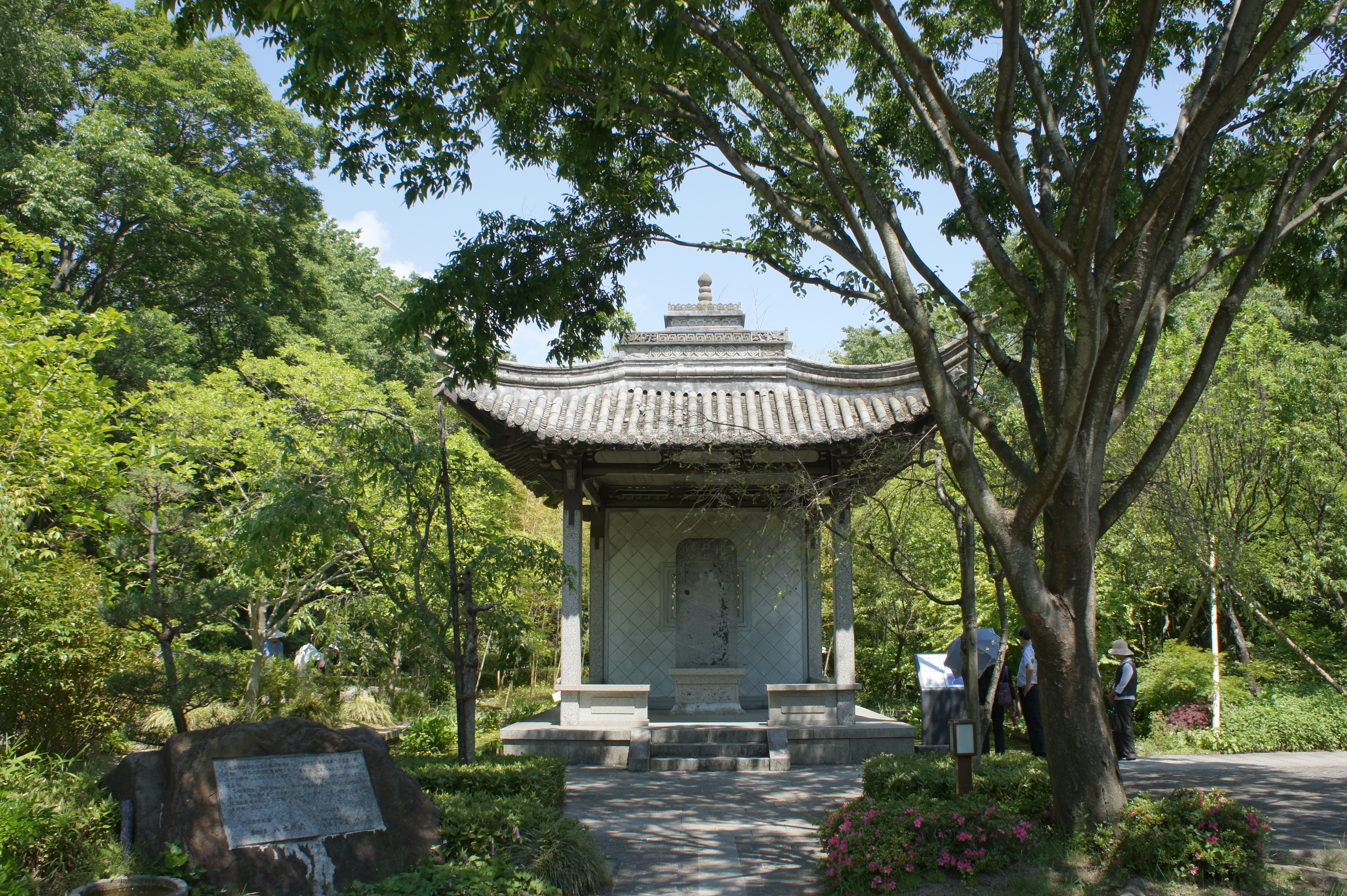

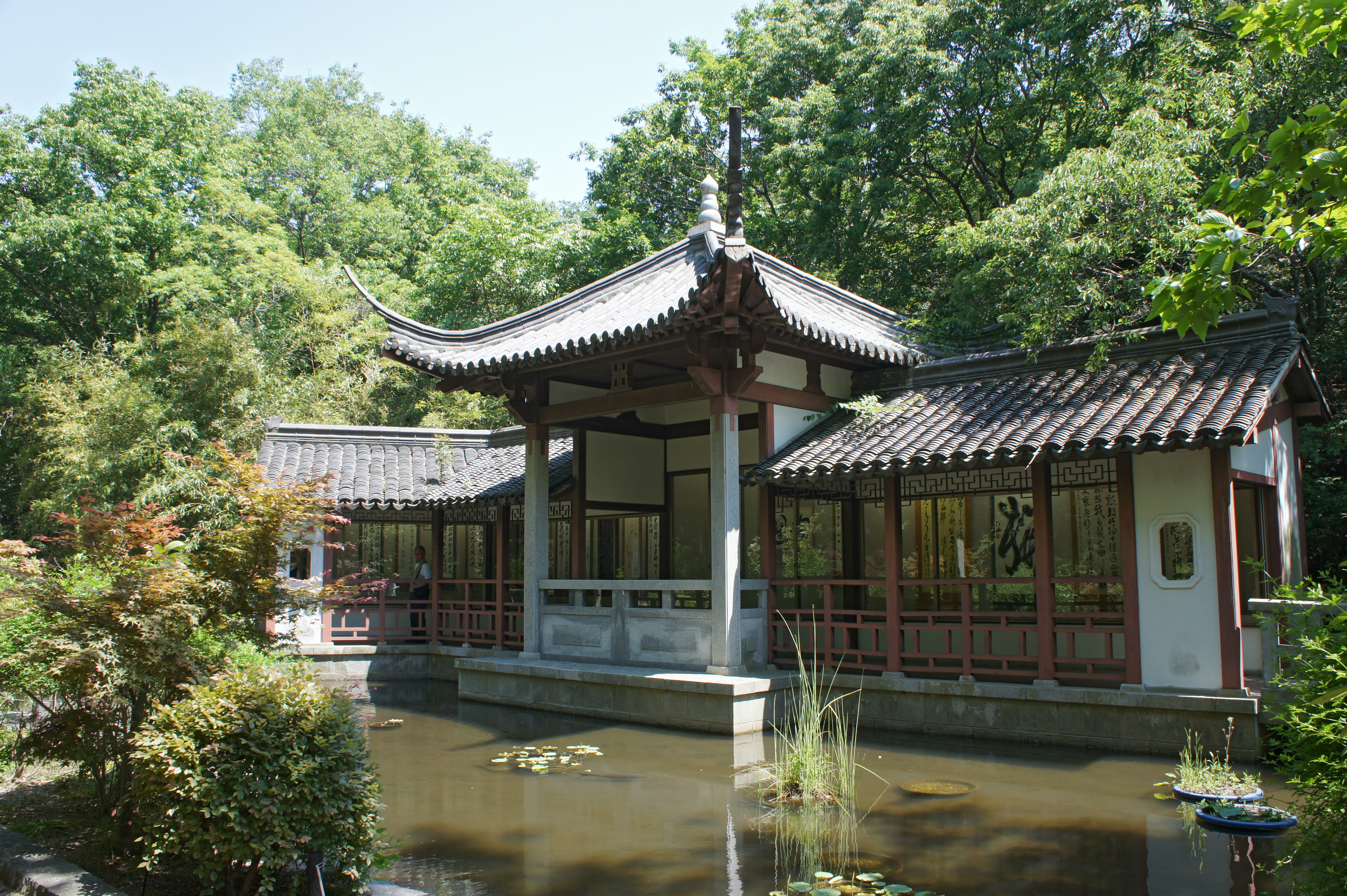

== See also ==
- List of botanical gardens in Japan
