= Hattori Ryokuchi Arboretum =

Arboretum in Toyonaka, Osaka, Japan

Coordinates: 34°46′13″N 135°29′28″E

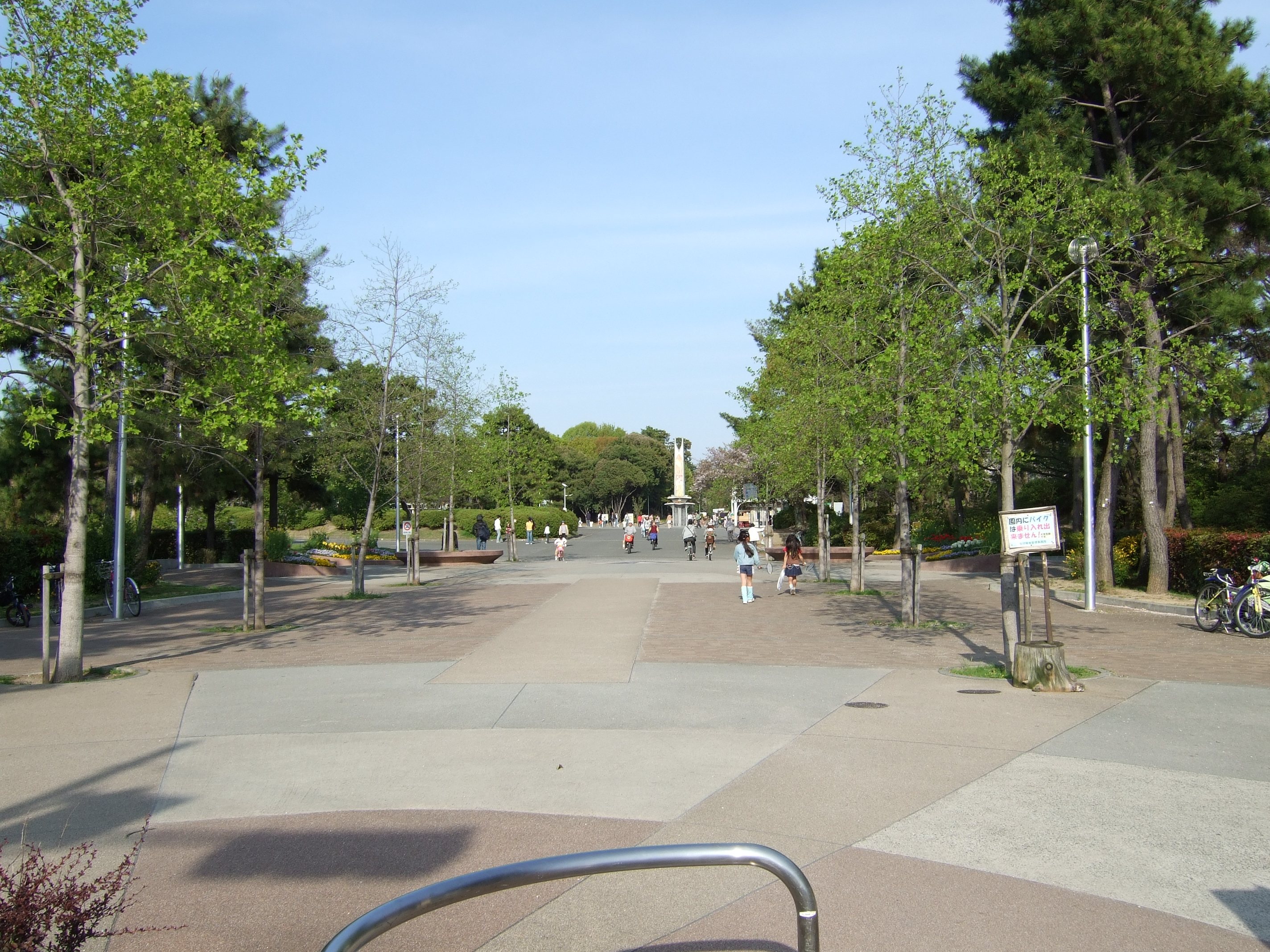
Hattori Ryokuchi arboretum entrance

The Hattori Ryokuchi Arboretum (服部緑地都市緑化植物園, Hattori Ryokuchi Toshiryokka Shokubutsuen) is an arboretum located within Hattori Ryokuchi Park at 1-13 Terauchi, Toyonaka, Osaka, Japan. It is open daily. The arboretum contains bamboo gardens and some 2,500 cherry trees planted across the park, including someiyoshino, yamazakura, and oyamazakura varieties.

== See also ==
- List of botanical gardens in Japan
