= Itsuko Hasegawa =

Japanese architect (born 1941)

- 長谷川 逸子
- Born: December 1, 1941 (age 84); Yaizu, Shizuoka, Japan
- Education: Kanto Gakuin University
- Occupation: Architect
- Practice: Itsuko Hasegawa Atelier
- Buildings: Shonandai Cultural Center; Yamanashi Fruits Museum
- Website: www.ihasegawa.com

Itsuko Hasegawa (長谷川 逸子, Hasegawa Itsuko; born December 1, 1941) is a Japanese architect. She established her own architectural practice in 1976, now known as Itsuko Hasegawa Atelier, and is an Honorary Fellow of the Royal Institute of British Architects. She has described her architectural approach through the concept of "second nature", linking architecture with landscape and the ways of life of local communities.

== Biography ==
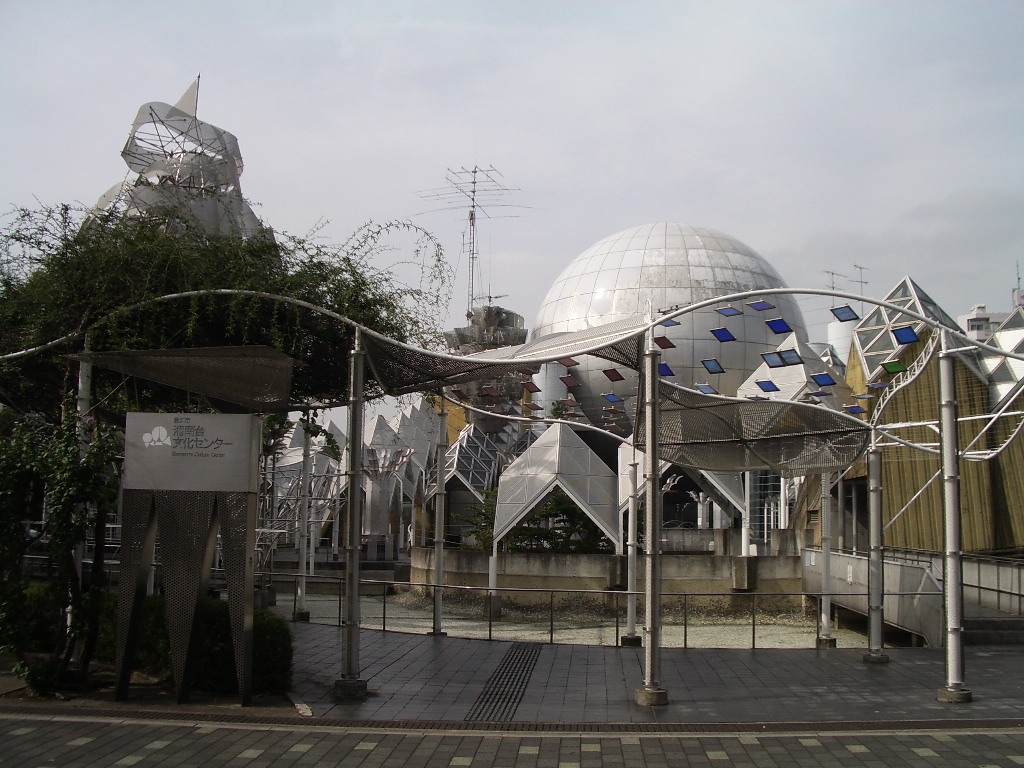
Shonandai Cultural Center

Itsuko Hasegawa was born in Yaizu, Shizuoka Prefecture, Japan in 1941. She studied at the Department of Architecture at Kanto Gakuin University, graduating in 1964. From then until 1969, she worked with Kiyonori Kikutake and then spent two years studying at Tokyo Institute of Technology. From 1971 to 1978 she worked under Kazuo Shinohara at the institute. She has lectured in Rotterdam, Australia, Norway and Los Angeles between 1984 and 1987. She became the principal of her own design studio in Tokyo, called Itsuko Hasegawa Architectural Design Studio in 1976, which was renamed the Architectural Design Studio in 1979.

In 1987, Hasegawa won first prize in a competition to design the Shonandai Cultural Centre. Initially, the design was not popular among the local residents, who were concerned on how the building would be buried below ground level. However, Hasegawa had many discussions with the residents, and when the opening phase of construction began in late 1989, the building was met with unanimous approval.

Hasegawa later described the Shonandai Cultural Centre as an expression of her concept of "second nature". Rather than creating a modern monument, she intended the project to function as a park for the local community. After its completion, she served as director of the children's museum for ten years and was involved in exhibitions, events, and other aspects of its operation.

In the summer of 1989, Hasegawa completed a design for the 270-seat theatre for the temporary four-month Nagoya Design exhibition.

Hasegawa won an open competition for the design of the Niigata Performing Arts Centre. The project contains a 1,900-seat concert hall, a 900-seat theatre, and a 375-seat Noh theatre, and is surrounded by an eight-hectare landscape. The venue was constructed atop reclaimed land that used to be part of the Shinano River.

In 2004, Hasegawa designed a new building for Shizuoka Tasei High School, her former school. She later designed a new junior high school building for the same school, completed in 2013.

Hasegawa is an Honorary Fellow of the Royal Institute of British Architects, and has received the Avon Arts Award, the Building Contractor's Society Prize for the Shonandai Cultural Center, the Cultural Award for Residential Architecture (Fukuoka, Japan), and a Design Prize from the Architectural Institute of Japan.

== Selected buildings ==
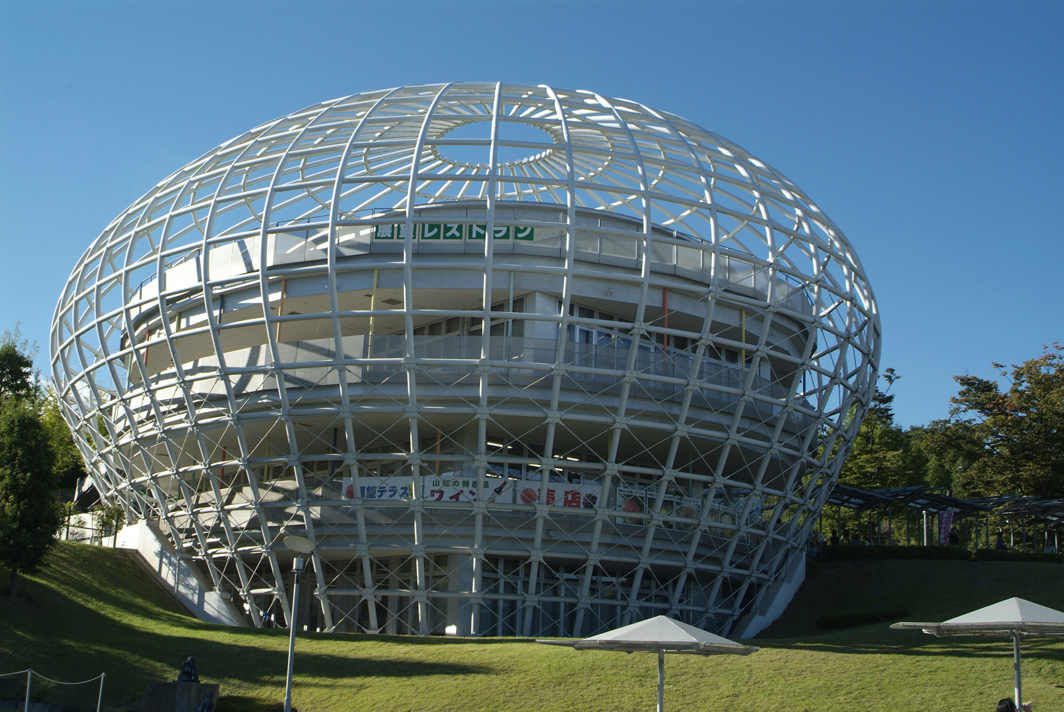
Yamanashi Fruit Museum and Garden, Japan

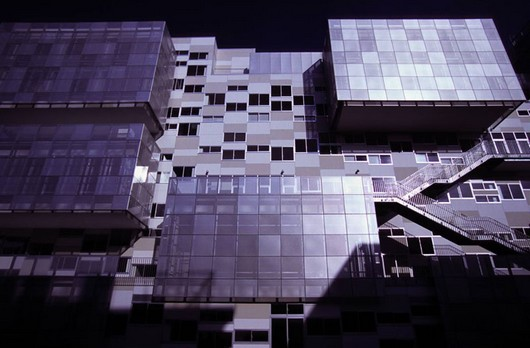
Shizuoka Tasei High School, Japan

- Tokumaru children's clinic, Ehime (1979)
- Aono building, Ehime (1980)
- Bizan Hall, Shizuoka (1984)
- Sugai Internal Clinic, Ehime (1986)
- Shonandai Cultural Centre (1987–1990) (Competition awarded 1987. Design, 1987–1988; construction, 1989–1990)
- Cardiff Bay Opera House; Japan Architect, 19, 68–71, Autumn 1995
- Himi Seaside Botanical Garden; Japan Architect, 19, 64–67, Autumn 1995
- Yamanashi Fruit Museum and Garden; Japan Architect, 19, 48–57, Autumn 1995
- Niigata City Performing Arts Centre; 1993–1998. Japan Architect, 19, 44–47, Autumn 1995
- Sumida Culture Factory, Tokyo (1994)
- Namekawa Housing, Ibaraki (1998)
- Shizuoka Tasei High School, Shizuoka (2004)
- Suzu Performing Arts Center, Ishikawa (2006)
- Court Decor Yonnosaka, Tokyo (2008)
- Fujinokuni Senbonmatsu Forum, Numazu (2013)
- Shizuoka Airport Deck, Shizuoka (2013)
- Shanghai Caohejing Office Project, Shanghai, China (2014)

== Selected awards ==
- Design Prize from the Architectural Institute of Japan for the Bizan Hall (1986)
- Japan Cultural Design Award for residential projects
- Elected as an Honorary Fellows of RIBA
- Japan Art Academy Award (2000)
- Honorary Degree Award from University College London
- Elected as an Honorary Fellow of AIA

== Selected writings ==
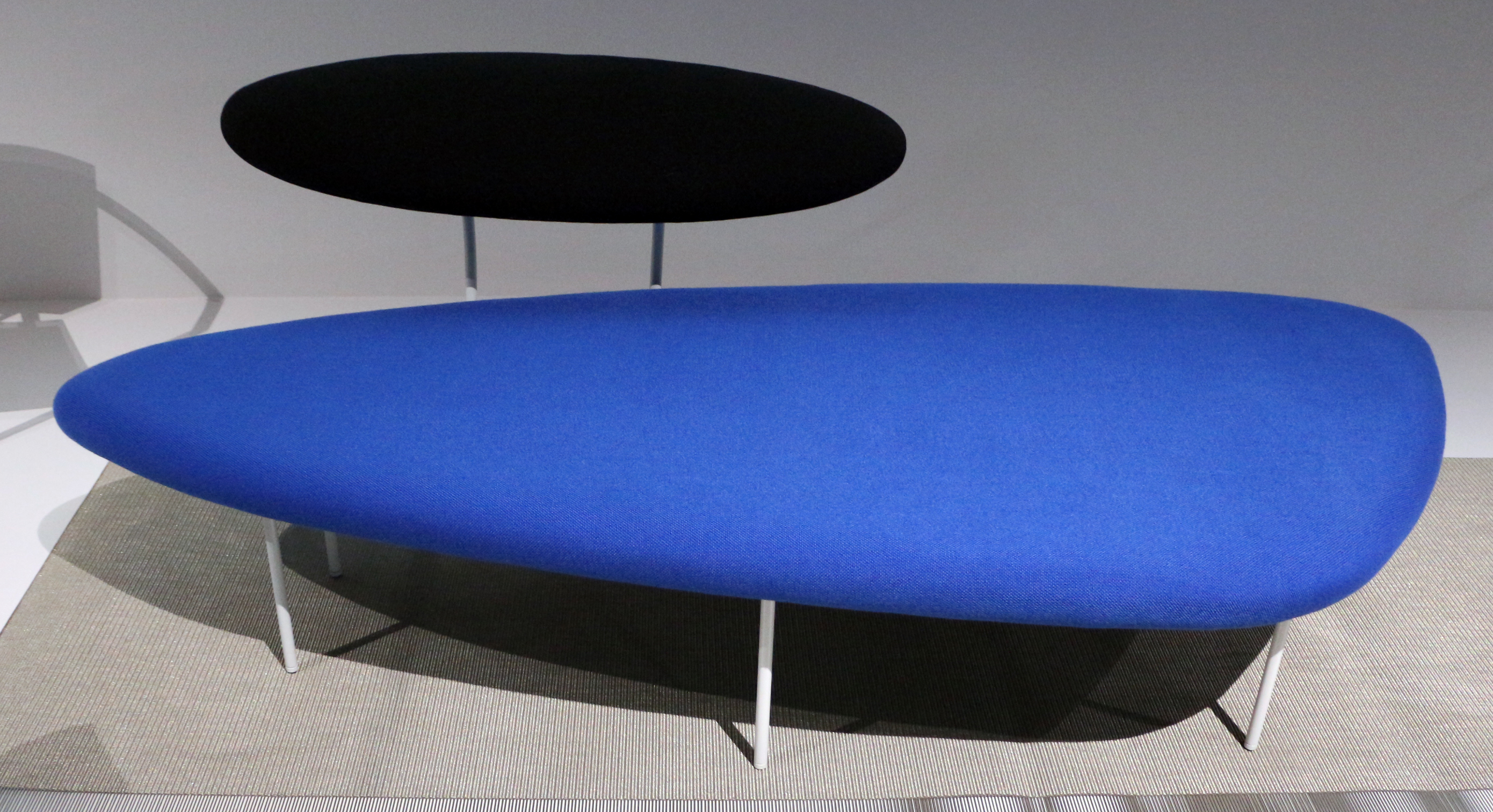
Sofa by Itsuko Hasegawa, Musée national d'art moderne, Paris

- Itsuko Hasegawa, Academy Editions, 1993. ISBN 1-85490-202-4.
- Itsuko Hasegawa, with Stephen Dobney, Images Pub. Group, 1997. ISBN 1-875498-55-9.
- Island Hopping – Crossover Architecture, NAi Publishers, 2000. ISBN 90-5662-186-6.
