= Himeji City Tegarayama Botanical Garden =

Botanical garden in Himeji, Hyogo, Japan

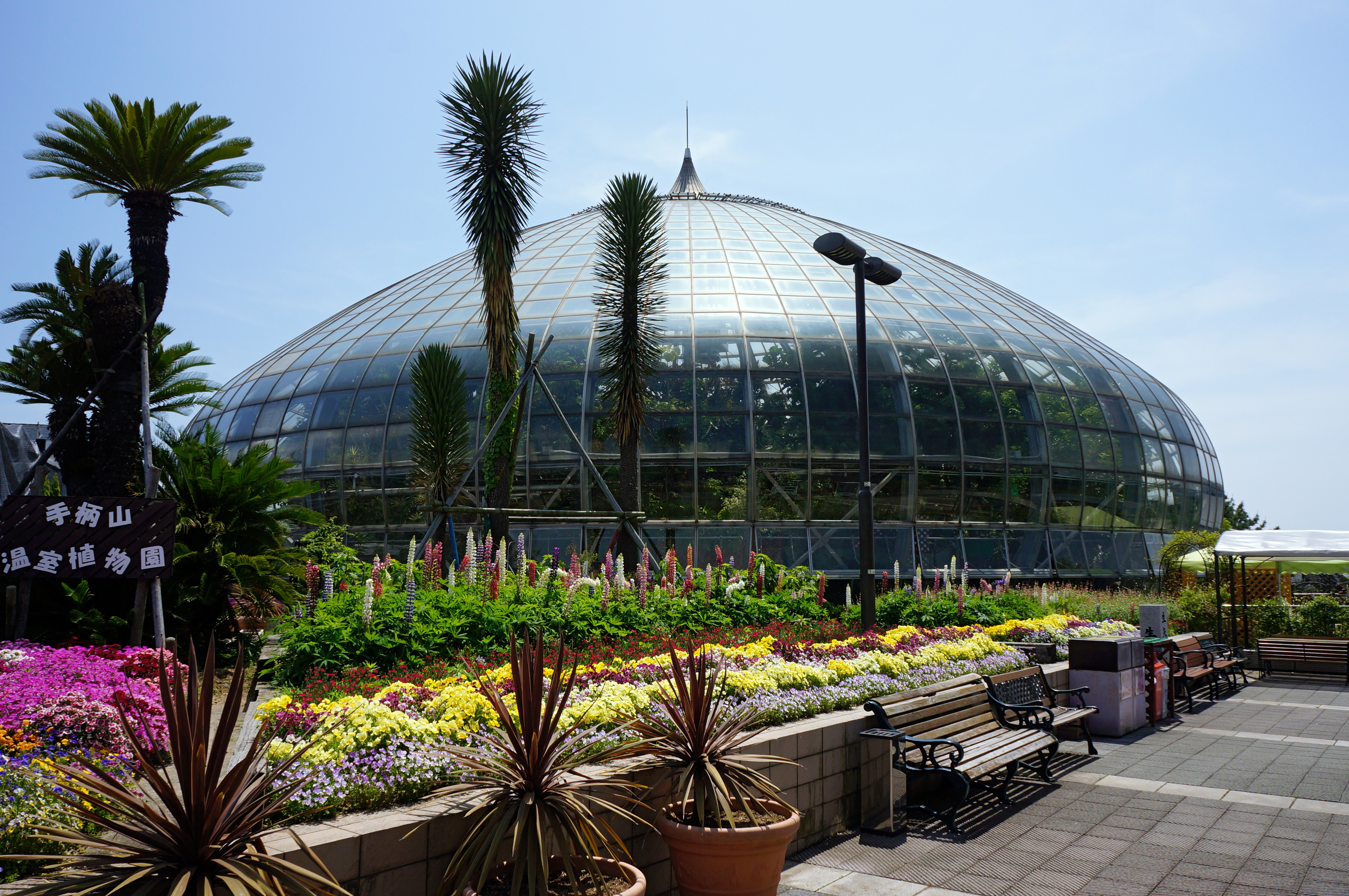
- Tegarayama Botanical Garden
- Interactive map of Himeji City Tegarayama Botanical Garden
- Type: urban park
- Location: Himeji, Hyōgo, Japan
- Coordinates: 34.8190°N 134.6754°E
- Created: 1990

The Himeji City Tegarayama Botanical Garden (姫路市立手柄山温室植物園, Himeji Shiritsu Tegarayama Onshitsu Shokubutsuen), also known as the Himeji Tegarayama Green House, is a botanical garden located within a greenhouse in Tegarayama Central Park at 93 Tegara, Himeji, Hyogo, Japan.

== See also ==
- List of botanical gardens in Japan
