= Nagasaki Subtropical Botanical Garden =

Former garden in Nagasaki, Nagasaki, Japan

Coordinates: 32°35′33.8″N 129°48′3.9″E

Nagasaki subtropical botanical garden (長崎 亜熱帯植物園 Nagasaki prefecture subtropical botanical garden Anettai Shokubutsuen) It is a botanical garden that was in Wakimisakimachi 833, Nagasaki, Nagasaki, Japan. Nagisaki Town, a subtropical botanical garden in Nagasaki City, was closed on March 31, 2017 and completed operation for 47 years. In the closing ceremony, volunteer leaders and members of the local residents' association also participated and missed parting with the garden which contributed to the revitalization of the area for about half a century.

== See also ==
- List of botanical gardens in Japan
