= Hiroshima Botanical Garden =

Coordinates: 34°23′30.9″N 132°20′49″E

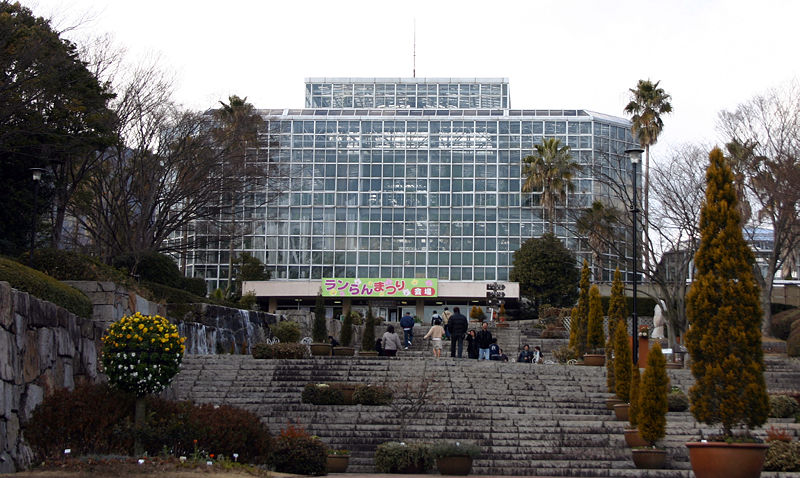
Hiroshima Botanical Garden

The Hiroshima Botanical Garden (広島市植物公園, Hiroshima-shi Shokubutsu Kōen) is located in Saeki-ku, Hiroshima in western Honshū, on the hill facing the Seto Inland Sea. The Garden was opened to the public on 3 November 1976.

Since its inception, the Garden has been adding to its collection of exotic as well as indigenous plants. The Garden has a collection of plants and flowers from several parts of the world, and has been organized in a number of display houses. It also has several Japanese classical horticultural plants such as morning glory and Japanese primrose.

The Garden, located on undulating terrain covers an area of around 18.3 hectares and keep about 234,000 plants for 11,400 taxa. The Garden undertakes a variety of activities, including research, creating awareness about the plant life and is divided into several segments, including research laboratory, conservatory, begonia display house, fuchsia display house, phylogenic garden, rock garden, Japanese garden, and camellia garden. There are 6 greenhouses for tropical plants, subtropical plants, water lilies, fuchsia, orchidaceae, cactus and begonias. They offered the nature experience programs to students. In the garden more than 50 kinds of birds can be seen.

== See also ==
- List of botanical gardens in Japan
