= Kagoshima Botanical Garden =

Garden in Kagoshima, Japan

Coordinates: 31°34′14″N 130°33′47.4″E

The Kagoshima Botanical Garden (かごしま熱帯植物園, Kagoshima Nettai Shokubutsuen), variously known as Kagoshima Tropical Botanical Garden, Kagoshima Tropical Vegetation Park, or Kagoshima Prefecture Botanical Gardens, was a botanical garden located at 1-7-15 Yojiro, Kagoshima, Kagoshima, Japan.

The garden was founded in 1971, and contained tropical plants from around the world, including palms, orchids, and cacti.

It was closed in 2006.

== See also ==
- List of botanical gardens in Japan
