= Ibaraki Botanical Garden =

Botanical garden and arboretum in Ibaraki, Japan

Coordinates: 36.474134°N 140.436623°E

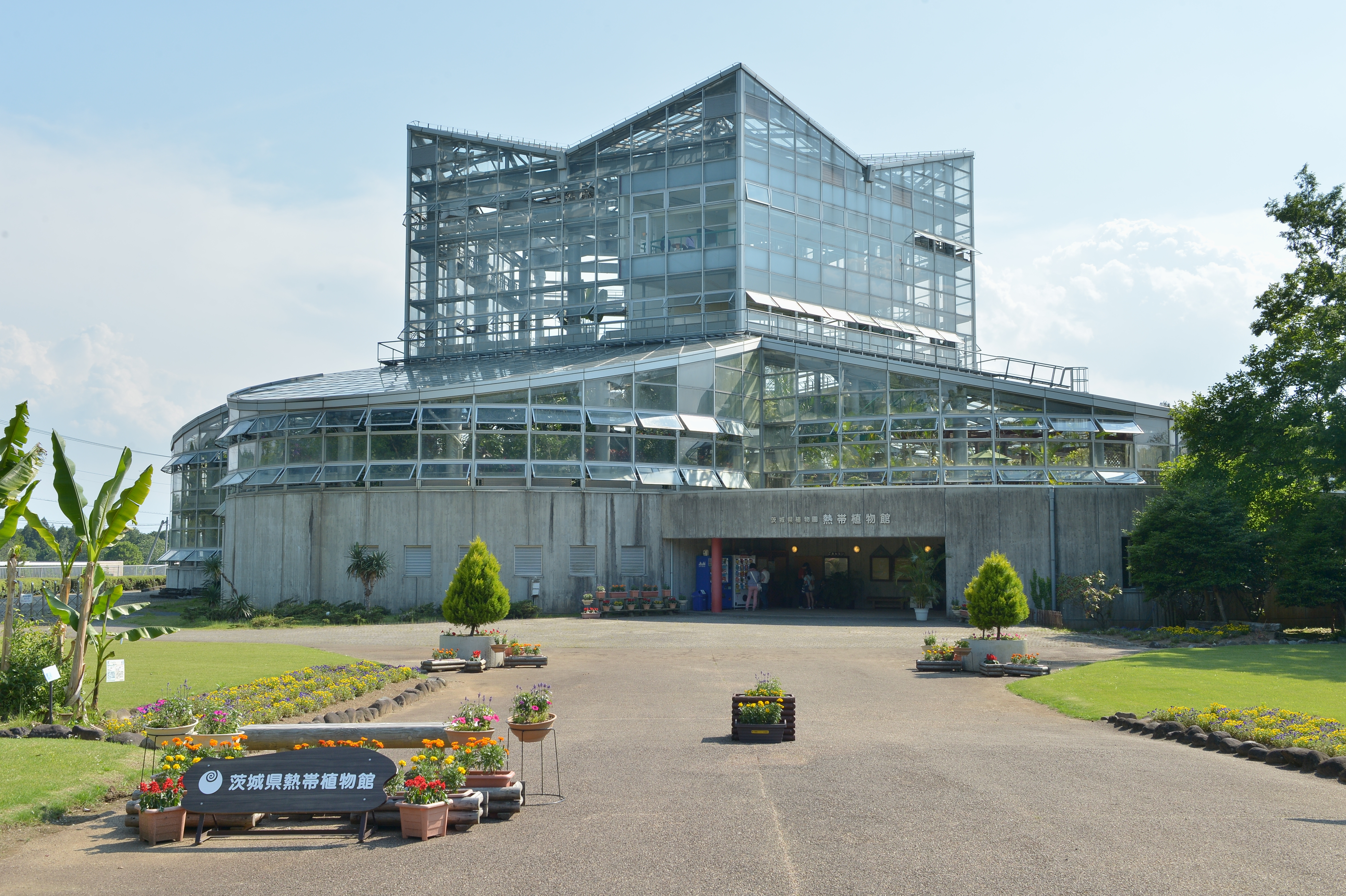
Ibaraki Botanical Garden Tropical Plant Building

The Ibaraki Botanical Garden (茨城県植物園, Ibaraki-ken Shokubutsuen) is a botanical garden and arboretum located at 4589 To, Naka, Ibaraki, Japan. It is open daily except Mondays; an admission fee is charged.

The garden was established in 1981, and now contains a rose garden, aquatic plant garden, rock garden; collections of camellias, conifers, and tropical fruit trees; and a tropical greenhouse. All told, the garden contains about 70 bird species and 600 plant species, including 240 species of tropical plants, with approximately 360 types of trees in its arboretum.

== See also ==
- List of botanical gardens in Japan
