= Niigata Prefectural Botanical Garden =

Botanical garden in Niigata, Japan

Coordinates: 37°45′40.9″N 139°6′43.8″E

The Niigata Prefectural Botanical Garden (新潟県立植物園, Niigata Kenritsu Shokubutsuen) is a 19.8 hectares (49 acres) botanical garden and arboretum located at 186 Kanazu, Akiha-ku, Niigata, Niigata, Japan. It is open daily except Mondays; an admission fee is charged.

The garden contains a collection of cherry trees, including Prunus x yedoensis, Prunus jamasakura, Prunus subhirtella Miq., and Prunus lannesiana; a conifer arboretum containing some 300 varieties from Europe and North America; another small arboretum, primarily cherry trees and conifers, given by the prefecture's towns and cities; and a collection of aromatic herbs (about 150 species).

The garden also contains substantial greenhouses including a large dome (30 meters tall, 42 meters in diameter), with about 550 species total in arid, aquatic, and tropical zones.

== See also ==
- List of botanical gardens in Japan
