= Shimokamo Tropical Botanical Gardens =

Botanical gardens in Kamo, Shizuoka, Japan

Coordinates: 34°38′57.55″N 138°51′48.37″E

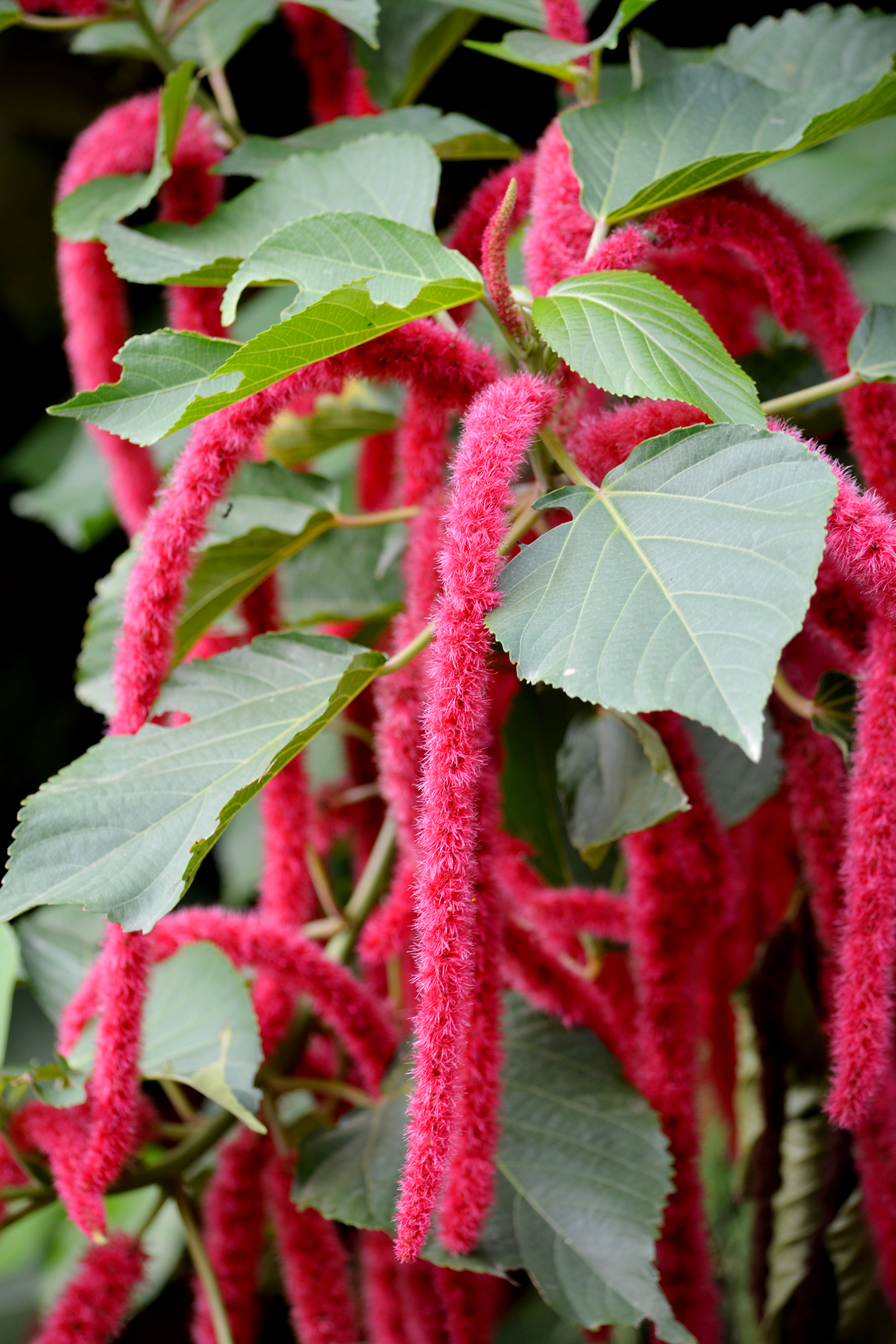

The Shimokamo Tropical Botanical Gardens (下賀茂熱帯植物園, Shimokamo Nettai Shokubutsuen), also known as the Shimokamo Tropical Garden, are botanical gardens located at Shimokamo Spa, 255 Shimokamo, Minami Izu-cho, Kamo, Shizuoka, Japan.

The garden contains about 2,000 species of tropical plants, including banana, bougainvillea, papaya, and pineapple.

== See also ==
- List of botanical gardens in Japan
