= Botanic Gardens of Toyama =

Japanese Botanical garden

Coordinates: 36°39′42.9″N 137°10′54.2″E

The Botanic Gardens of Toyama (富山県中央植物園, Toyama-ken Chūō Shokubutsuen, 24.7 hectares) are botanical gardens located at 42 Kamikutsuwada, Fuchu-machi, Nei-gun, Toyama, Toyama, Japan. They are open daily except Thursdays; an admission fee is charged.

Garden construction began in 1989. The gardens first opened to the public in 1993, with greenhouses following in 1996 and 2000. The gardens promote research as well as education, aiming to cultivate, preserve, investigate, and research plants. To this end the gardens publish a scholarly journal, the Bulletin of the Botanic Gardens of Toyama.

Today the gardens contain about 5,000 Japanese and foreign plant species. Notable collections include plants of the Japan Sea coast and of Yunnan, China, and tropical and subtropical plants. Outdoor gardens contain a Japanese tree peony collection, plants of Yunnan, fragrant plants, flower displays, clematis, coastal plants and plants of low-altitude plains and marshes, and a forest of chestnuts and Japanese oaks, etc. Greenhouses include a tropical plant house, orchid house, tropical fruit house, Alpine plant house, and Yunnan greenhouse.

== See also ==
- List of botanical gardens in Japan
