= Mito Municipal Botanical Park =

Botanical garden in Mito, Ibaraki, Japan

Coordinates: 36°20′25″N 140°25′17″E

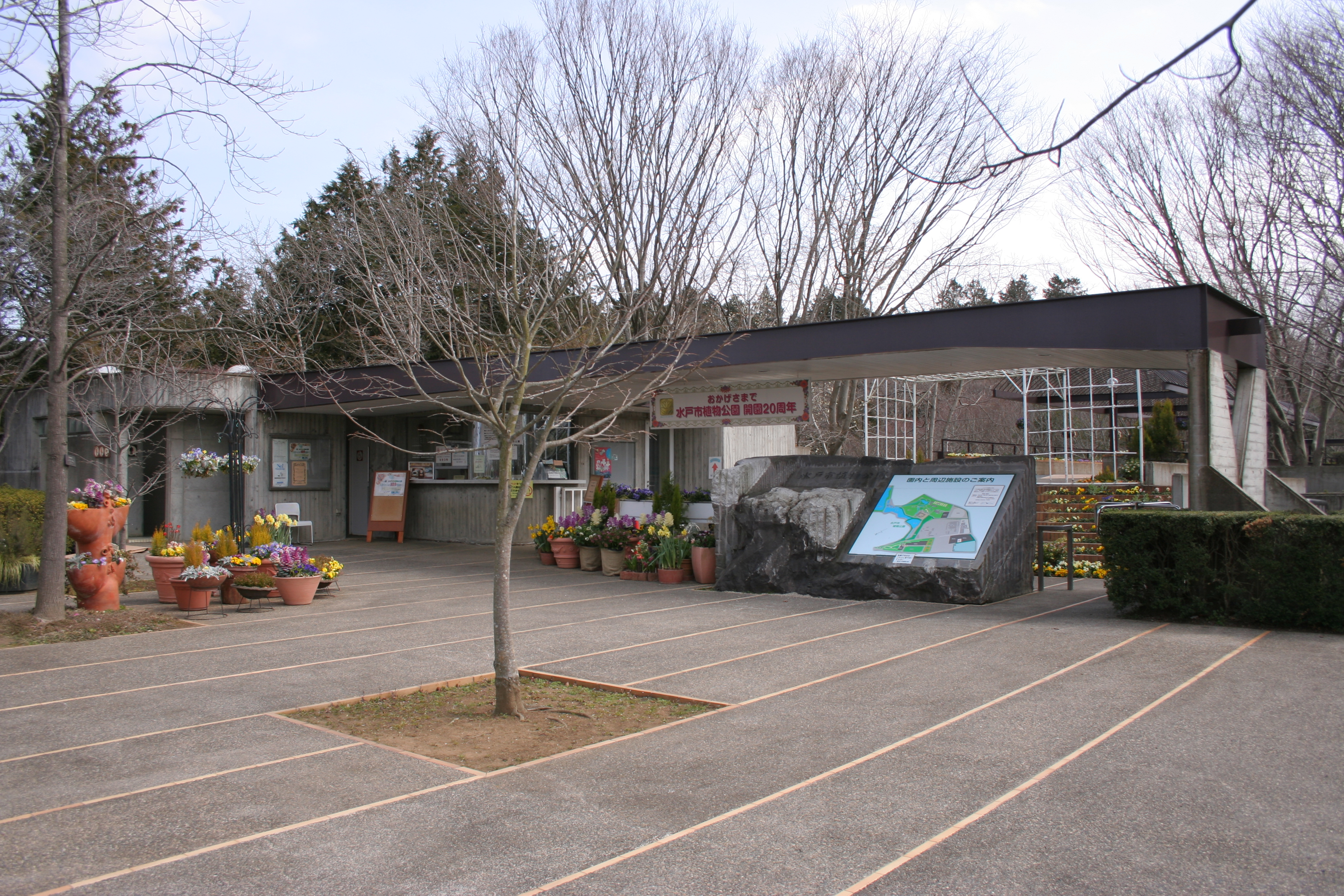

The Mito Municipal Botanical Park (水戸市植物公園, Mito-shi Shokubutsu Kōen) is a botanical garden located at 504 Kobuki, Mito, Ibaraki, Japan. It is open daily except Mondays; an admission fee is charged.

The garden contains a terrace, rock garden, lawn, water features, and greenhouses heated from burning waste in the adjoining garbage disposal center.

== See also ==
- List of botanical gardens in Japan
