= Botanic Garden, Faculty of Science, Kanazawa University =

Botanical garden in Kakuma-machi, Kanazawa, Ishikawa, Japan

Coordinates: 36°32′25″N 136°42′05″E

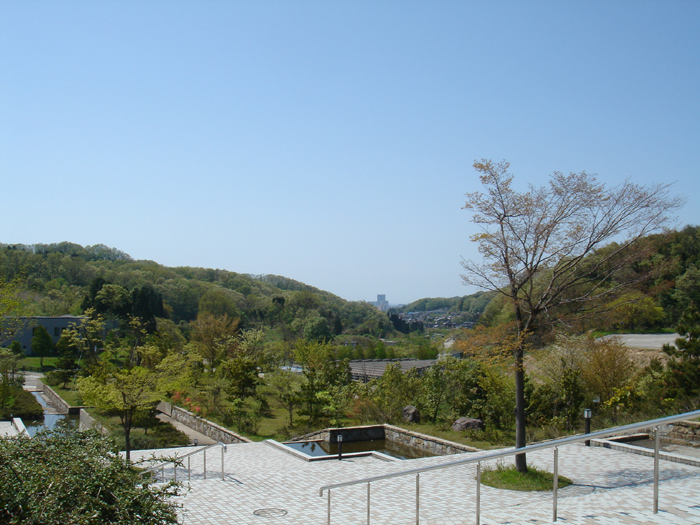
Kanazawa University6.jpg

The Botanic Garden, Faculty of Science, Kanazawa University (金沢大学理学部附属植物園, Kanazawa Daigaku Rigakubu Fuzoku Shokubutsuen) is a botanical garden operated by Kanazawa University. It is located at the university's Kakuma Campus in Kakuma-machi, Kanazawa, Ishikawa, Japan.

The garden was established in 1949, and in 1995 moved to its current location. Its mission is to advance botanical research and education, and to conserve genetic resources. It publishes the "Annual report of Botanic Garden, Faculty of Science, Kanazawa University".

== See also ==
- List of botanical gardens in Japan
