= Himi Seaside Botanical Garden =

Botanical garden in Toyama, Japan

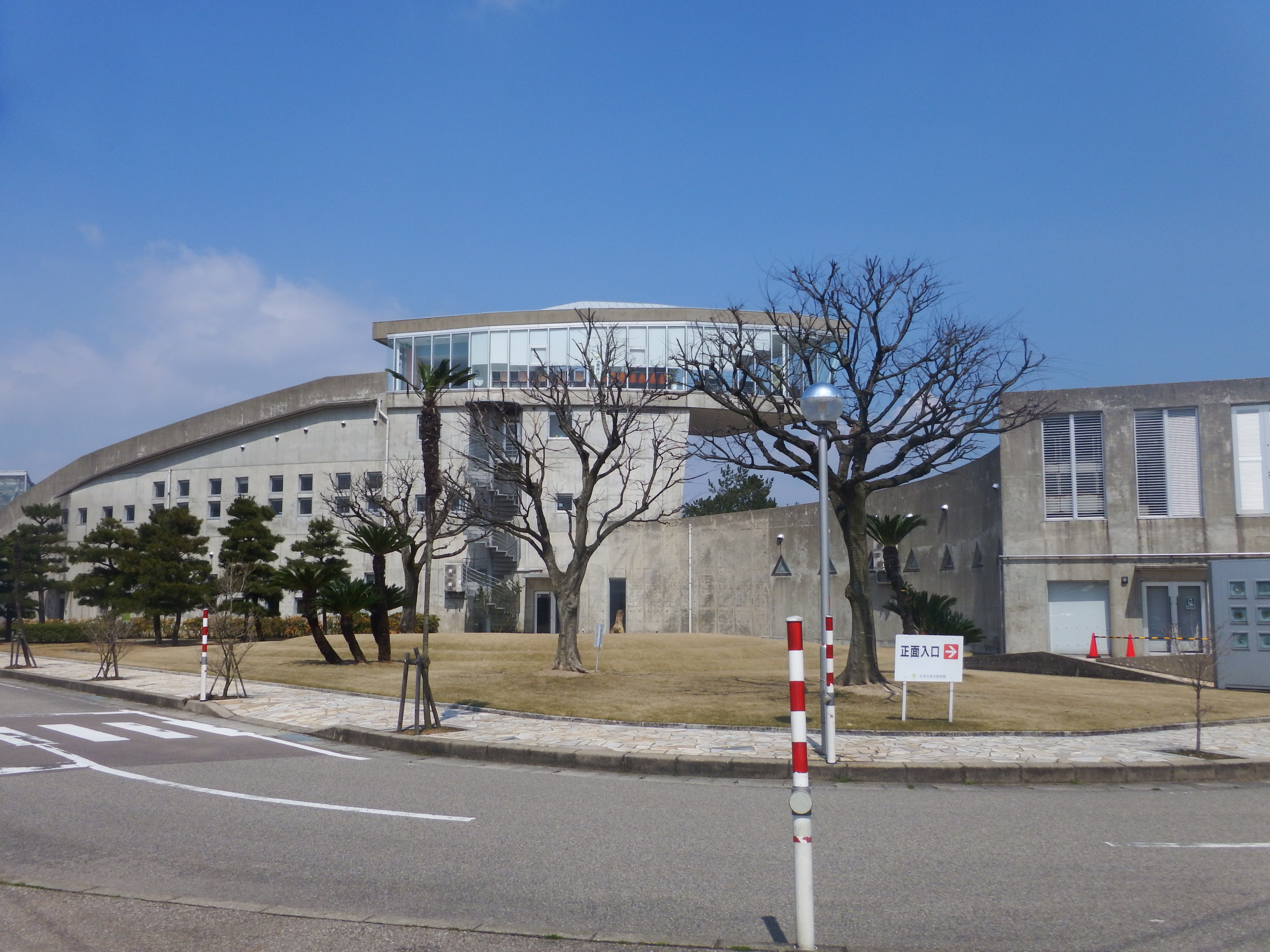
- Himi Seaside Botanical Garden

- Location within Toyama Prefecture Location within Japan
- Type: Private
- Location: Himi, Toyama, Japan
- Coordinates: 36.8371°N 137.0041°E
- Created: 1996

The Himi Seaside Botanical Garden (氷見市海浜植物園, Himi-shi Kaihin Shokubutsuen) is a botanical garden located at 3583 Banchi, Tanagida, Himi, Toyama, Japan. It is open daily except Tuesdays; an admission fee is charged.

The garden opened in 1996 beside Matsudae-no-Nagahama, a seaside promenade along a beach of white sands and green pines mentioned in the Man'yōshū. It is set within a striking building designed by architect Itsuko Hasegawa.

The garden specializes in seaside plants, and features a greenhouse with water tank of mangroves, tropical and subtropical plants, climbing plants, seaside plants from various places in Japan, and an insect exhibit.

== See also ==
- List of botanical gardens in Japan
