= Southeast Botanical Gardens =

Commercial botanical garden in Okinawa, Japan

- 東南植物楽園; Tōnan Shokubutsu Rakuen
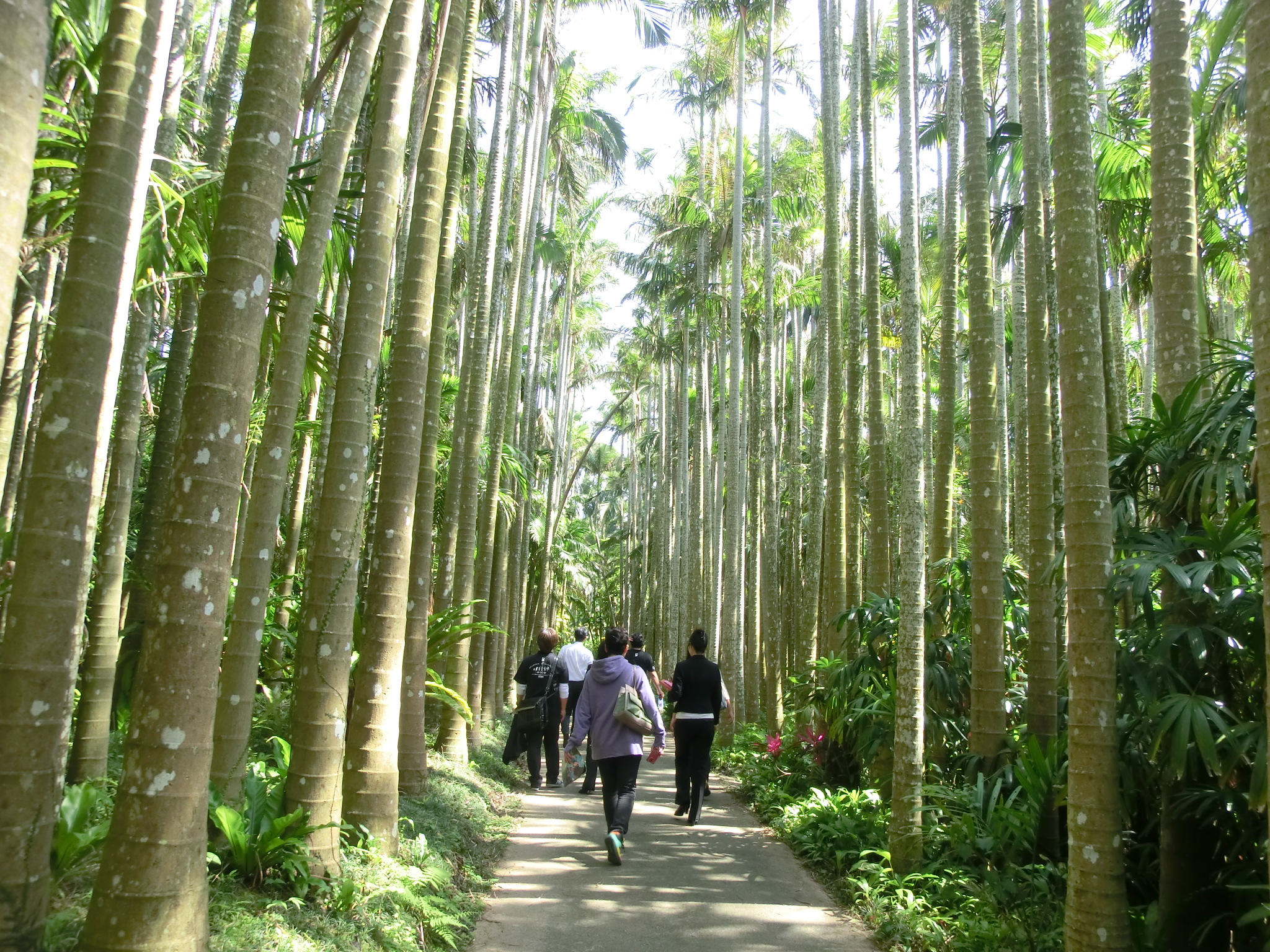
- Path of palm trees, Southeast Botanical Gardens

- Location within Japan
- Type: Botanical garden
- Location: Okinawa, Okinawa, Okinawa Prefecture, Japan
- Coordinates: 26°22′36″N 127°48′24″E
- Area: 100 acres (40.47 ha)
- Created: 1968
- Operator: Tōnan Shokubutsu Rakuen & Tapic Group

The Southeast Botanical Gardens (東南植物楽園, Tōnan Shokubutsu Rakuen) is a commercial botanical garden located in the city of Okinawa, Okinawa Prefecture, Japan. The garden is open daily; an admission fee is charged.

== Layout ==
The gardens covers 100 acres (40.47 ha) and contain over 2,000 plant species, including some 450 species of palms, as well as flowers, fruit trees, a Polynesian Lake with carp, and an insect collection.

== History ==
The Southeast Botanical Gardens closed in December 2010, and reopened on July 6, 2013 under a new management company, the Tapic Group.

== See also ==
- List of botanical gardens in Japan
