= Kosobe Conservatory =

Former botanical garden in Japan

Coordinates: 34°51′34.2″N 135°37′30″E

The Kosobe Conservatory (古曽部温室, Kosobe Onshitsu) was a botanical garden that forms part of the Experimental Farm, Kyoto University (京都大学大学院 農学研究科附属農場), located at 2-30 Kosobe, Takatsuki, Osaka, Japan.

The conservatory was established in January 1929 to educate undergraduate and graduate students, and to advance horticultural research in ornamental plants of tropical and subtropical origin. Today its collections include orchids, begonias, Nepenthes, and Melastomataceae.

Kyoto University Kosobe greenhouse is closed at present, and an apartment is constructed by the site. The farm moved to Kizugawa, Kansai Science City.

== See also ==
- List of botanical gardens in Japan
