= Experimental Station for Landscape Plants =

Research and plant-breeding arboretum in Chiba, Japan

Coordinates: 35°39′45″N 140°04′29″E

The Experimental Station for Landscape Plants (緑地植物実験所, Ryokuchi Shokubutsu Jikkensho), also called the Kemigawa Arboretum, is a research and plant-breeding arboretum operated by the University of Tokyo Faculty of Agriculture, and located at Hata-machi 1051, Hanamigawa-ku, Chiba, Chiba, Japan.

The arboretum was established in 1965 as the Horticultural Experimental Station to collect and study garden and landscape plants, and to develop techniques for their cultivation, breeding, and use. In 1975 it evolved into the Experimental Station of Plants for Landscaping to reflect the importance of landscape plants in protecting the environment. In 1989 it received its present name.

The arboretum covers 47,031 m^{2}, and contains about 350 species (500 varieties) of woody plants and flowers, with excellent collections of Camellia japonica (130 varieties), Camellia sasanqua (30 varieties), and flowering lotus (including 250 varieties of Nelumbo nucifera and Nelumbo lutea). The arboretum also contains other aquatic plant species, lawn grass varieties, and herbs, as well as a general arboretum, and two greenhouses.

== See also ==
- List of botanical gardens in Japan
