= Fukuoka Municipal Zoo and Botanical Garden =

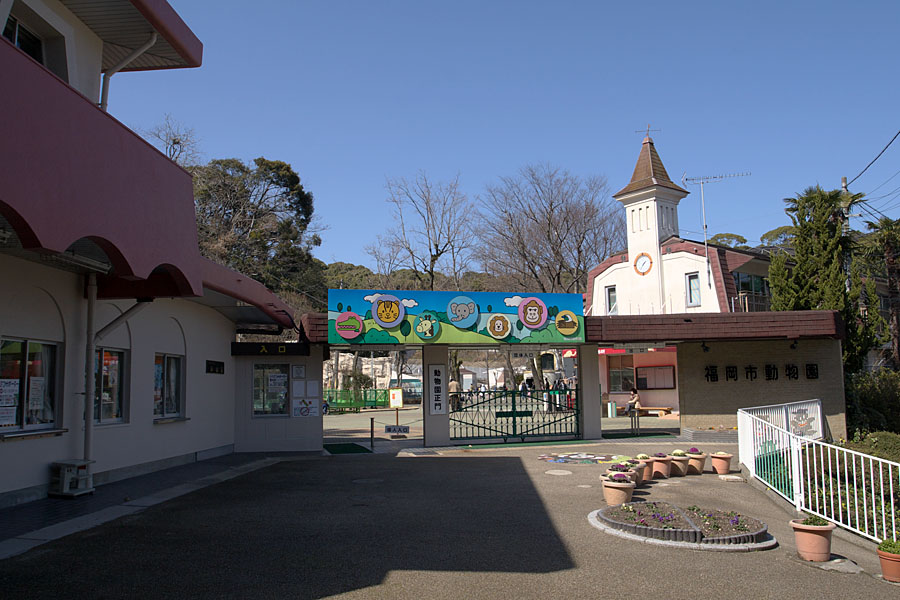
- Zoo entrance
- Interactive map of Fukuoka Municipal Zoo and Botanical Garden
- 33.572261°N 130.390424°E
- Date opened: 1933; 1953 (in current location)
- Location: Fukuoka, Fukuoka, Japan
- Memberships: JAZA, BGCI
- Website: zoo.city.fukuoka.jp

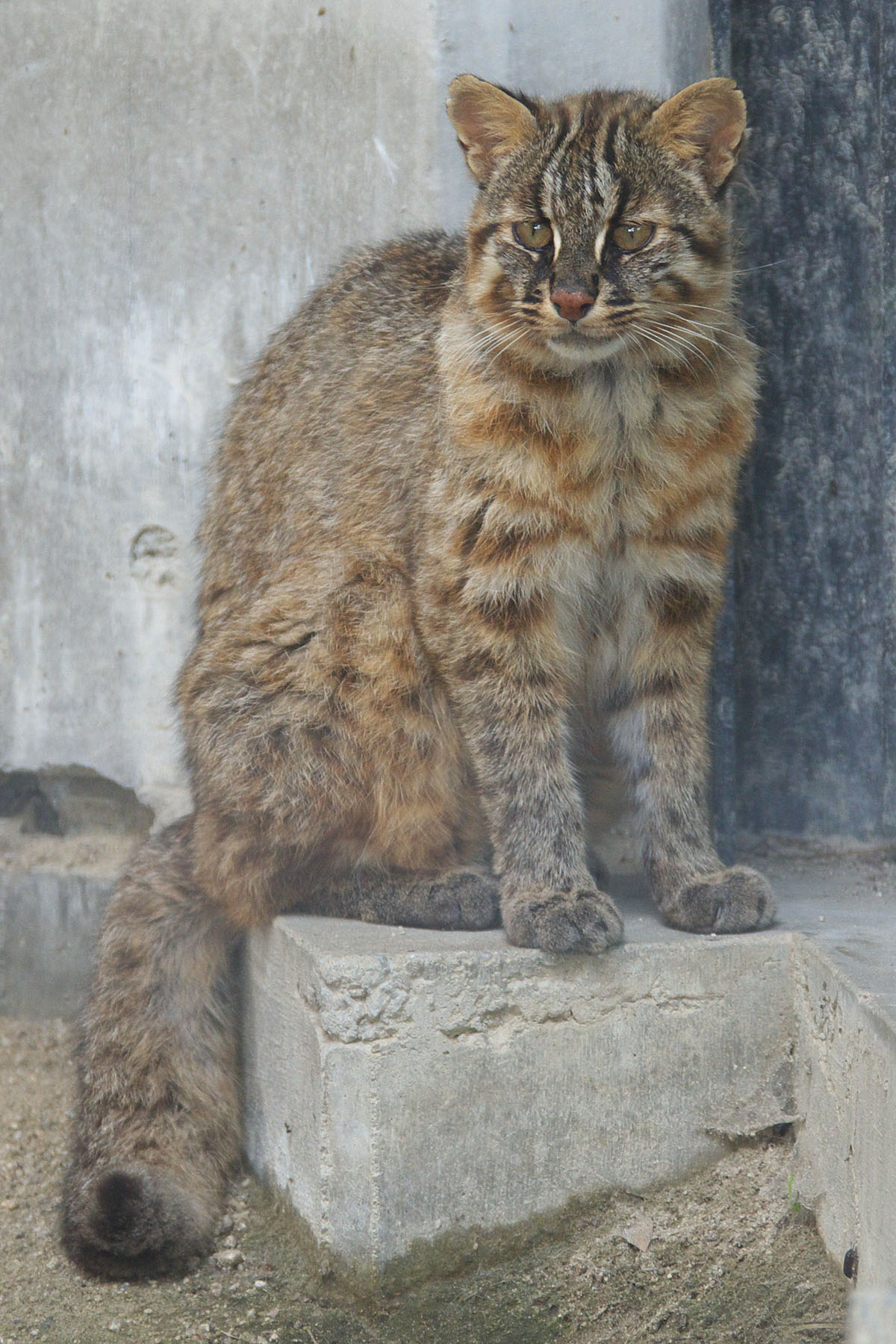
Tsushima cat bred at the Fukuoka Zoo

The Fukuoka Municipal Zoo and Botanical Garden (福岡市動植物園, Fukuoka-shi Dōshokubutsuen), also known as the Fukuoka City Zoological Garden, is a zoo and botanical garden established in 1953 and located within Minami-koen (En: "South park") at 1-1, Minami-Koen, Chūō-ku, Fukuoka, Fukuoka, Japan.

The garden contains about 1,300 types of outdoor garden plants, mostly common. Its greenhouse contains over 1,200 plant species including orchids, ferns, and cacti.

== History ==
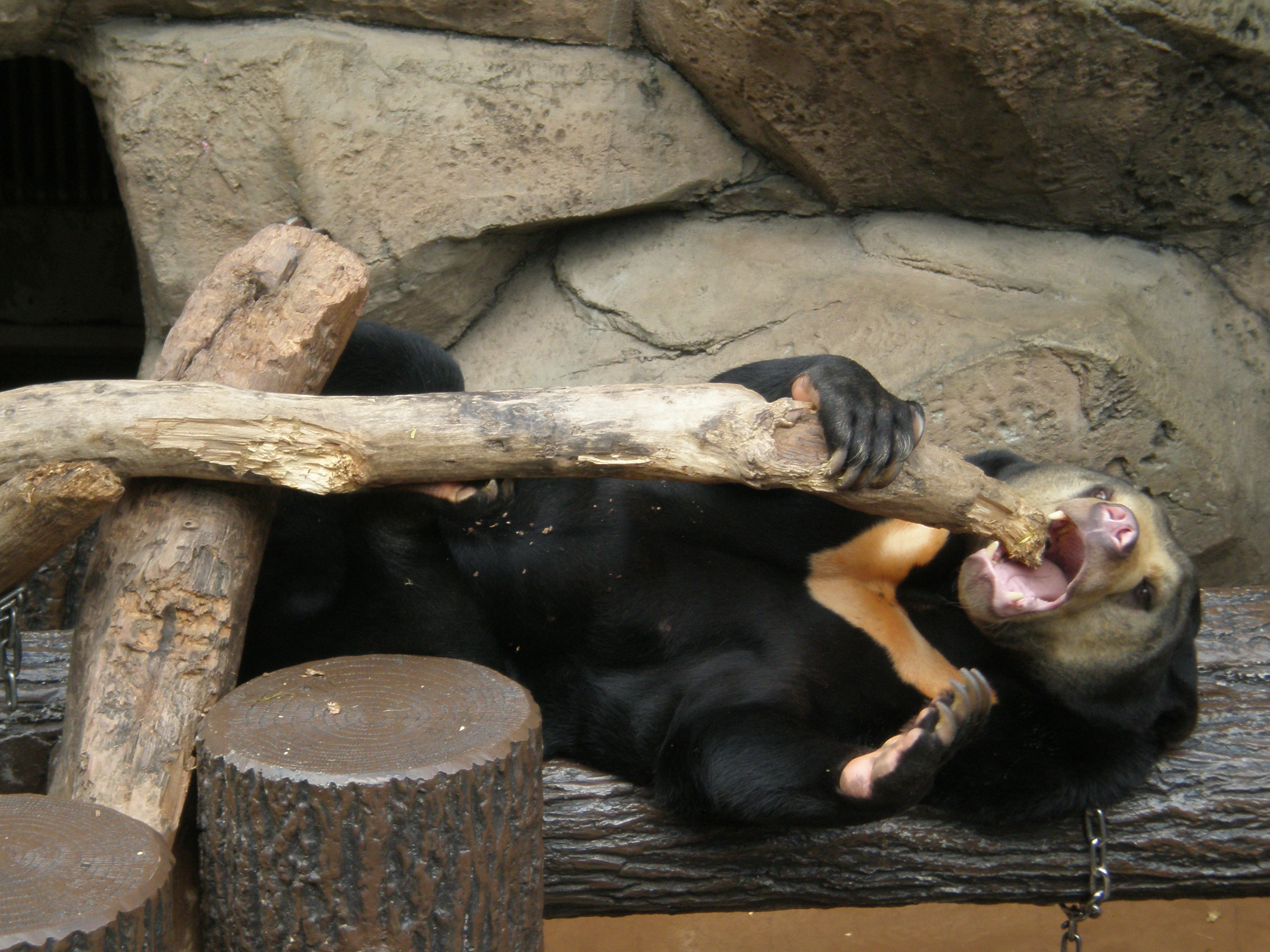
A Malayan sun bear from Fukuoka Zoo

The gardens were originally established near the city's East park in 1933 as part of the celebration of the coronation of Emperor Hirohito. This small 5,096-tsubo (1.685 ha) zoo and botanical garden included about 500 animals and 100 species of plants. The zoo was closed to the public on 20 May 1944 due to the deteriorating state of World War II for the country. Large animals were subsequently euthanized. Pillars from the old zoo gate are still standing near one of the elementary schools in the city.

In 1949 the city approved the establishment of a zoo in the city's South park. The Fukuoka City Zoological Society was established in 1952, and ¥28 million was raised for the new zoo.

The zoo opened in its current location on 22 August 1953, with 143 animals representing 69 species. It included a play area with a miniature train and a Ferris wheel. When it opened, the zoo was home to one elephant, who was still living at the zoo in 2011.

In 1954 the zoo was expanded to the North by about 6,500-tsubo (21,000 m^{2}), and the animal collection expanded to include 353 individuals representing 110 species. In 1955 the zoo was transferred to the jurisdiction of the Jurisdiction of the Ministry of Economic Affairs and Tourism Division, Fukuoka. An additional 6 hectares (15 acres) was added to the zoo in 1956, and the animal collection again expanded to include 400 individuals of 120 species.

By 2003 (the fiftieth anniversary of opening in its current location), the zoo had hosted more than 40 million visitors, and was home to 706 animals representing 168 species, including 57 species of mammals, 88 species of birds, and 23 species of reptiles.

The zoo's only elephant, Hanako, died in 2017 at the approximate age of forty-six. To replace her, the Myanmar city Yangon gave Fukuoka Zoo four elephants in July 2024. One of the elephants, a twelve year old female, died from elephant endotheliotropic herpesvirus a few months after her arrival.

== See also ==
- List of botanical gardens in Japan
