= Tsurumi-ku, Osaka =

Tsurumi-ku, Osaka 大阪市鶴見区
- Ward of Osaka
- 鶴見区• Tsurumi-ku
- Location of Tsurumi in Osaka

- Coordinates: 34°42′15″N 135°34′27″E
- Country: Japan
- Region: Kansai
- Prefecture: Osaka
- City: Osaka
- Named for: Separated from Jyoto-ku, on July 22, 1974

Area
  - Total: 8.16 km^{2} (3.15 sq mi)

Population (November 1, 2012)
  - Total: 111,832
  - Density: 13,704.9/km^{2} (35,496/sq mi)
- Time zone: UTC+9 (Japan Standard Time)
- Flower: Benthamidia florida, Tulip, Camellia, Catharanthos roseus
- Address: Yokozutsumi 5-4-19, Tsurumi-ku, Osaka-shi, Osaka-fu; 538-8510

Tsurumi (鶴見区, Tsurumi-ku) is one of 24 wards of Osaka, Japan. It is best known for its large parkland, Tsurumi-Ryokuchi, the site of the 1990 International Garden Exposition.

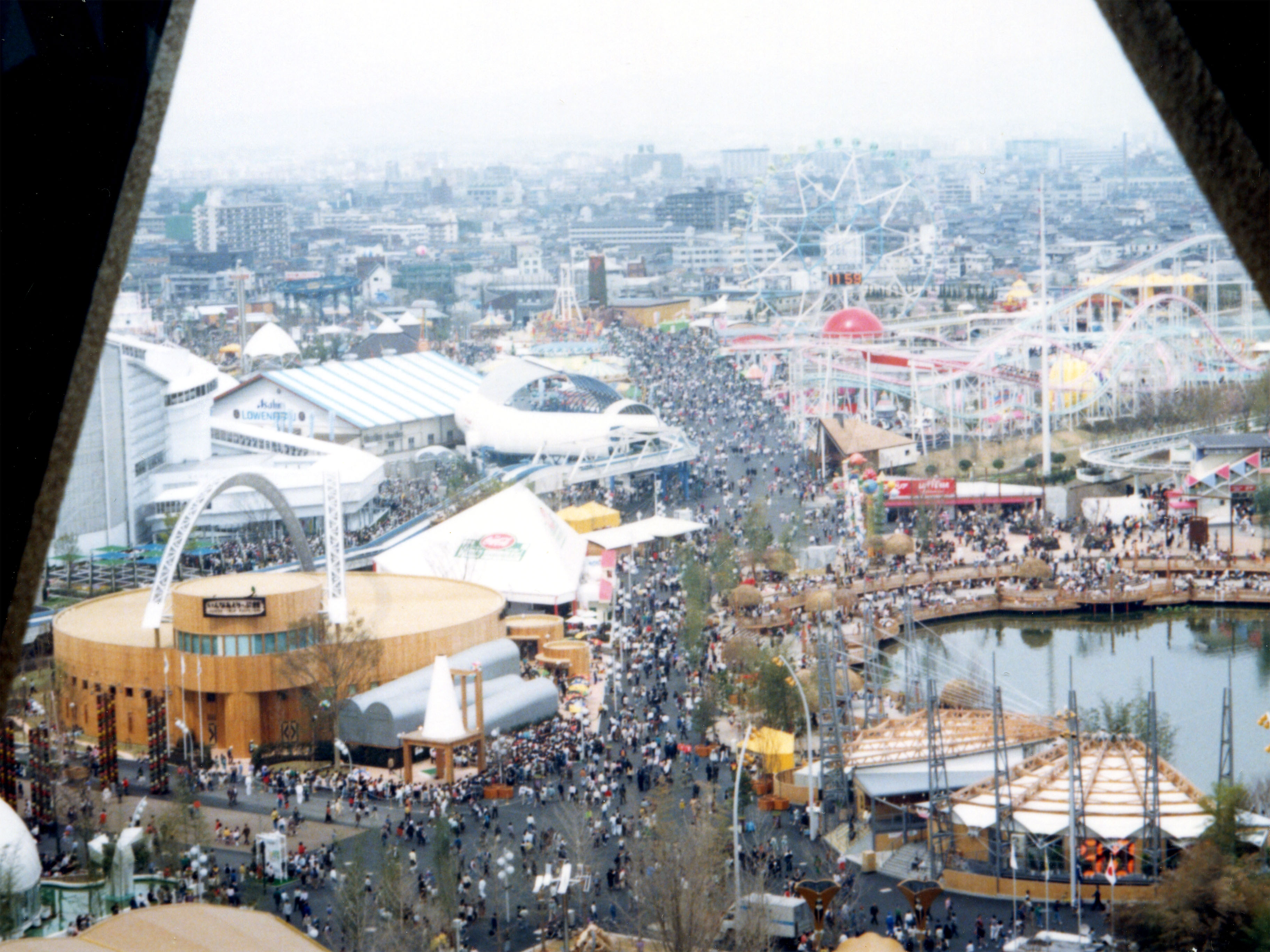
The International Garden and Greenery Exposition in Tsurumi Garden Park, 1990

== Education ==
Osaka Shin-ai College Tsurumi Campus is located here.

== Points of interest ==
- Sakuya Konohana Kan
