= Kawaguchi Green Center =

City park and botanical garden in Saitama, Japan

Coordinates: 35°50′45″N 139°43′35″E

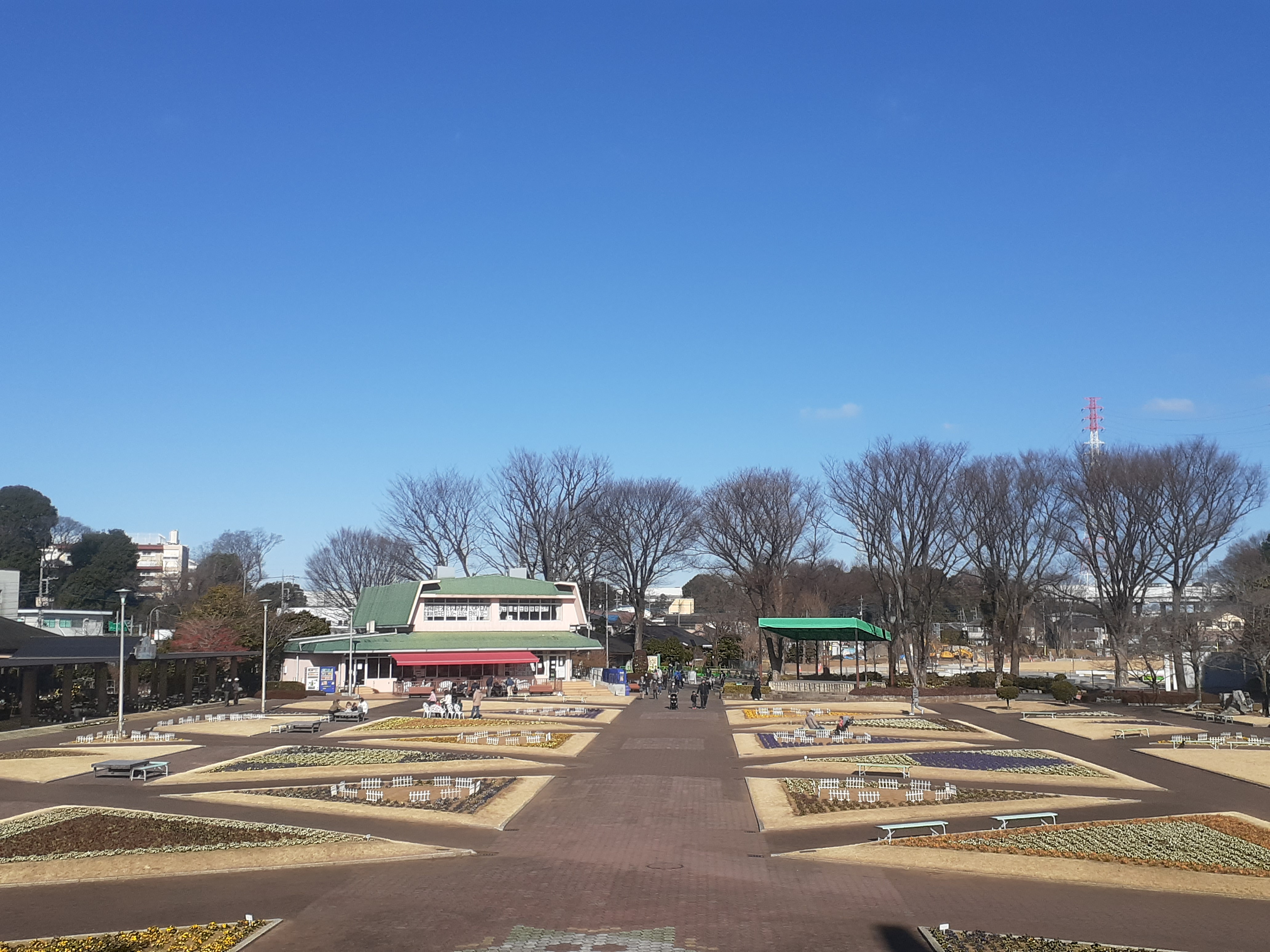
Kawaguchi Green Center

The Kawaguchi Green Center (川口市立グリーンセンター, Kawaguchi Shiritsu Gurīnsentā), sometimes also called the Botanical Garden of Kawaguchi-City, is a city park and botanical garden located at Araijuku 700, Kawaguchi, Saitama, Japan. Admission is 300 yen for adults and 100 yen for children.

The garden was established in 1967, and contains fountains, plum trees, and topiary pieces, as well as greenhouses with collections including banana, bougainvillea, lotus (Nymphaea), orchids, and succulent plants.

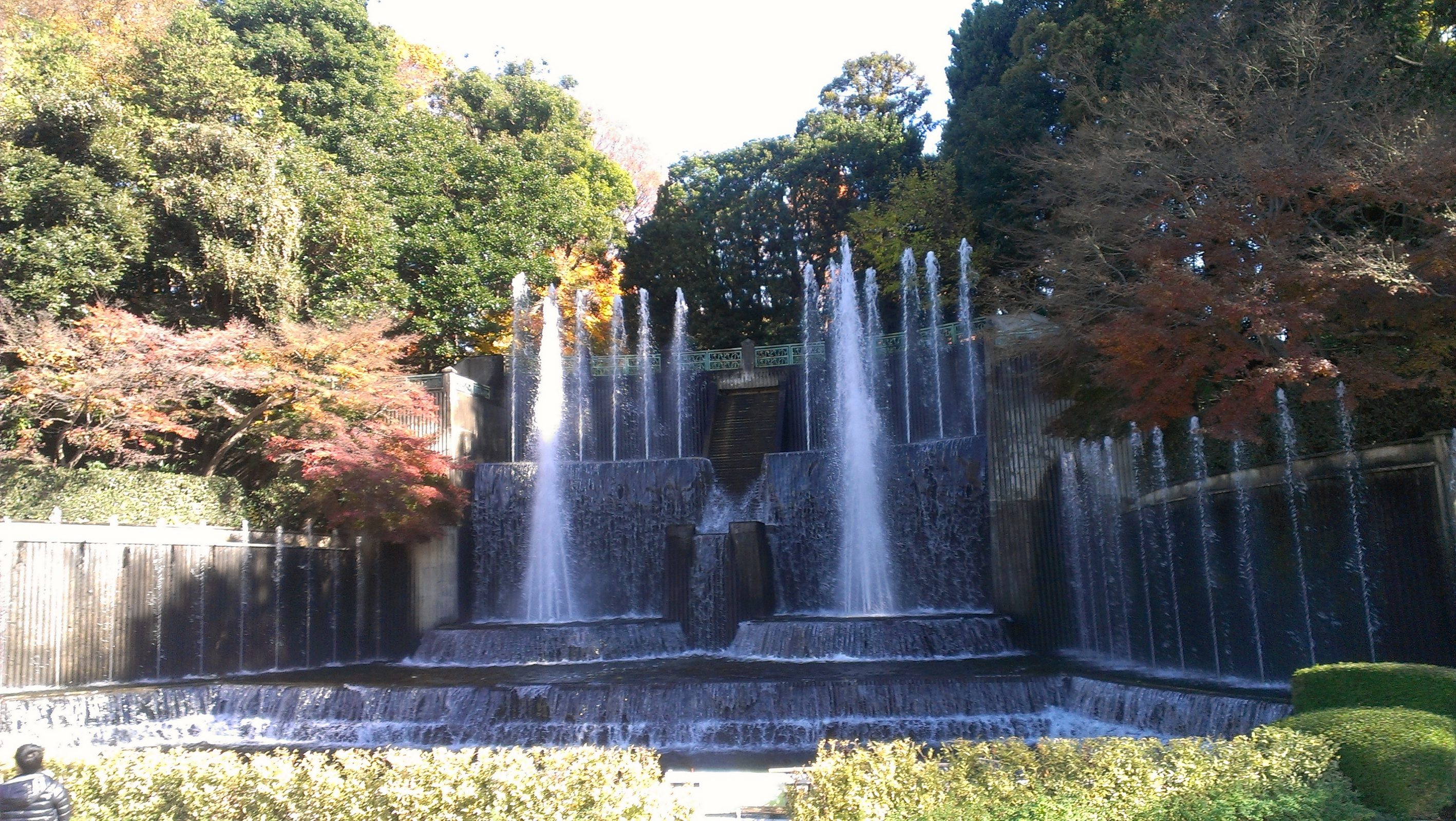
Fountain

== See also ==
- List of botanical gardens in Japan
