= Sakuya Konohana Kan =

Botanical garden in Osaka, Japan

Coordinates: 34°42′36″N 135°34′25″E

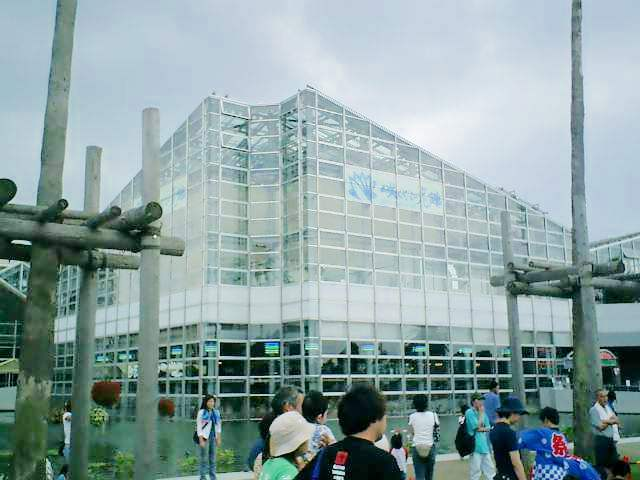
Sakuya Konohana Kan

The Sakuya Konohana Kan (咲くやこの花館) is a botanical garden set within one of the world's largest greenhouses, located in Tsurumi Ryokuchi park at 2-163 Ryokuchi Koen, Tsurumi-ku, Osaka, Japan. It is open daily except Mondays; an admission fee is charged.

The gardens were constructed between 1987 and 1989, and currently contain about 15,000 plants representing 2,600 species from various climatic zones. Total floor space is about 6,900 m² with a maximum height of 30 meters. The conservatory is divided into a number of cool and hot houses as follows:

- Alpine House - 200 alpine plant species including primula, blue poppy from the Himalayas and western China, and alpine plants from the Alps, Rockies, and Japanese mountains
- Arctic and Antarctic Plant Area - cold-region flora including moss from the Showa Station (Antarctica) and Saxifraga oppositifolia from the Arctic Circle
- Flower Hall - exhibit hall with coconut palm trees
- Humid Tropical Plant House - jungle plants from the tropics, including orchids, palm trees, and Chinese banyan
- Succulent Plant House - desert plants from Africa, Madagascar, Australia, and Latin America
- Tropical Aquatic Plant Area - aquatic plants including waterlily, victorias, and mangroves
- Tropical Flowering Trees and Shrubs
- Tropical Insectivorous Plant Area - Nepenthes and other carnivorous plants
- Tropical Water Plants in Aquarium - aquatic plants within an aquarium

The greenhouse's name is taken from the phrase Sakuya Konohana (咲くやこの花), the beginning of a poem collected in the Kokin Wakashū anthology edited in 905 at Emperor Daigo's order. It means "Now is the time for the blossoms to bloom in Osaka".

== See also ==
- List of botanical gardens in Japan
