= Sasebo Zoological Park and Botanical Garden =

Zoo and botanical garden in Sasebo, Nagasaki, Japan

Coordinates: 33.151227°N 129.689513°E

The Sasebo Zoological Park and Botanical Garden (西海国立公園九十九島動植物園, Saikai Kokuritsu Kōen Kujūkushima Dōshokubutsuen) is a zoo and botanical garden located at 2172, Funakoshi-cho, Sasebo, Nagasaki, Japan. It is open daily; an admission fee is charged.

The zoo opened on May 25, 1961, and now contains about 330 animals and 21,000 plants. Its rainforest greenhouse contains tropical plants such as the royal water lily.

== See also ==
- List of botanical gardens in Japan
