= Yamashina Botanical Research Institute =

Research botanical garden in Kyoto, Japan

Coordinates: 34°58′18.9″N 135°49′9″E

The Yamashina Botanical Research Institute (山科植物資料館) is a research botanical garden specializing in medicinal herbs, operated by Nippon Shinyaku and located at Oyakesaka no tsujicho 39, Yamashina-ku, Kyoto, Kyoto, Japan. It is open from Monday through Friday; please write ahead for permission to visit.

The institute was established in 1934. Today its garden is 8,000 m² in extent, and consists of one large and two small greenhouses, an arboretum, an herb garden, and a botany school with library and laboratories. It contains more than 3,000 species of medicinal and useful plants, including rare species of orchid, and cultivars of marijuana from around the world.

== See also ==
- List of botanical gardens in Japan
