= Kawaguchi (surname) =

Kawaguchi (written: 川口 or 河口 lit. "river mouth") is a Japanese surname. Notable people with the surname include:

- Ekai Kawaguchi (1866–1945), Japanese Buddhist monk
- Hiroshi Kawaguchi (composer) (born 1965), Japanese composer and keyboardist
- Junnosuke Kawaguchi (born 1961), Japanese bassist
- Kaiji Kawaguchi (born 1948), Japanese manga author
- Keiichiro Kawaguchi, Japanese animator and director
- Masafumi Kawaguchi (born 1973), Japanese player of American football
- Matsutarō Kawaguchi (1899–1985), Japanese writer
- Kiyotake Kawaguchi (1892–1961), Japanese general during World War II
- Senri Kawaguchi (born 1997), Japanese drummer
- Takao Kawaguchi (born 1950), Japanese judoka
- Yoichiro Kawaguchi (born 1952), Japanese computer graphics artist
- Yoriko Kawaguchi (born 1941), Japanese politician
- Yoshikatsu Kawaguchi (born 1975), Japanese footballer
- Yuko Kavaguti (born 1981), Japanese Russian pair skater
- Yutaka Kawaguchi (born 1973), Japanese ice hockey player
- Hiromu Kawaguchi (born 1962) Japanese Canadian karateka
