= Kamo, Shizuoka =

Kamo 賀茂村
- Former municipality
- Flag Emblem

- Location in Japan
- Coordinates: 34°50′54″N 138°46′35″E
- Country: Japan
- Region: Chūbu (Tōkai)
- Prefecture: Shizuoka Prefecture
- District: Kamo
- Merged: April 1, 2005 (now part of Nishiizu)

Area
  - Total: 39.64 km^{2} (15.31 sq mi)

Population (April 1, 2005)
  - Total: 3,291
  - Density: 83/km^{2} (210/sq mi)
- Time zone: UTC+09:00 (JST)
- Symbols
- Flower: carnation
- Tree: pine

Kamo (賀茂村, Kamo-mura) was a village located in Kamo District, Shizuoka Prefecture, Japan.

As of 2005, the village had an estimated population of 3,291 and a density of 83 persons per km^{2}. The total area was 39.64 km^{2}.

On April 1, 2005, Kamo was merged into the expanded town of Nishiizu and thus no longer exists as an independent municipality.

== Points of interest ==
- Atagawa Tropical & Alligator Garden
- Shimokamo Tropical Botanical Gardens
