= 2015 JAFA Division I football season =

2015 JAFA football season
- Regular season: August 28, 2015 – December 13, 2015
- National championship: 2016 Koshien Bowl
- Location of championship: Koshien Stadium; Nishinomiya, Japan
- Champion: TBD

The 2015 Japan college football season, play of college football in Japan organized by the Japan American Football Association (JAFA) at the Division I level, began on August 28, 2015, with the regular season ending December 13, 2015 with the 2015 Koshien Bowl. The winner will advance to the Rice Bowl to play the champion of the X-League.

== Conference standings ==
2015 Hokkaido American Football Association Division 1 football standings
	Conf.			Overall
Team	W		L	W		L
Hokkaido	5	–	0	5	–	0
Hokkai Gakuen	3	–	2	3	–	2
Obihiro	2	–	3	2	–	3
Sapporo	2	–	3	2	–	3
Sapporo Gakuin	1	–	4	1	–	4
Hokusei Gakuen	1	–	4	1	–	4
As of November 9, 2015

2015 Kansai Collegiate American Football League Division 1 football standings
	Conf.			Overall
Team	W		L	W		L
Ritsumeikan $	7	–	1	10	–	1
Kwansei Gakuin	7	–	1	9	–	1
Kansai	6	–	3	6	–	3
Kyoto	4	–	4	4	–	5
Kobe	5	–	4	8	–	4
Ryukoku	3	–	6	3	–	6
Kinki	2	–	6	2	–	7
Momoyama Gakuin	0	–	9	0	–	10
$ – Conference champion; As of December 14, 2015

== Conference summaries ==
Note: Records are regular-season only, and do not include playoff games.

Conference	Champion	Record	Offensive Player of the Year	Defensive Player of the Year	Coach of the Year
Chushikoku	Hiroshima	3–0	Taniguchi MotoYu (QB, Hiroshima)	Haraguchi Takashi (DL, Hiroshima)	
Hokkaido	Hokkaido	5–0	Kosei Ito (RB, Hokkaido)		
Hokuriku	Fukui Prefectural	4–0			
Kansai	Ritsumeikan	7–0	西村七斗 (RB, Ritsumeikan)	仲里広章 (DL, Ritsumeikan)	
Kantoh	Waseda	6–1			
Kyūshū	Seinan Gakuin	5–0			
Tohoku	Tohoku	4–0			
Tokai	Meijo	5–0			

== Playoff bracket ==
First Round
*

Second Round
1
8	*

Quarterfinals
Third place

== Postseason Bowls ==
Date	Game	Site	TV	Radio	Teams	Affiliations	Results
December 6	Tokyo Bowl	Fujitsu Stadium; Tokyo, Japan			Kwansei Gakuin; Nihon	Kansai Collegiate American Football League; Kantoh Collegiate American Football Association	
