= Koshien Bowl =

Annual Japanese American football championship game

- Mainichi Koshien Bowl supported by Family Mart
- 甲子園ボウル
- Stadium: Koshien Stadium
- Location: Nishinomiya
- Previous stadiums: Nishinomiya Stadium (1960); Nagai Stadium (2007 — 2008)
- Previous locations: Osaka (2007 — 2008)
- Operated: 1947-present

Sponsors
- Mainichi Shimbun; Nissin Foods (1985 — 1987); Sanwa Group (1988 — 1991); Matsushita Electric Industrial Co. (1992 — 1999); House Foods (2000 —); Mitsubishi Electric (2016 —2025); Family Mart (2016 —2025)

Former names
- Mainichi Bowl (1960); Mainichi Koshien Bowl in Nagai (2007 — 2008)

2025 matchup
- Ritsumeikan Panthers vs Kwansei Gakuin Fighters (Ritsumeikan 38-14)

2026 matchup
- TBD

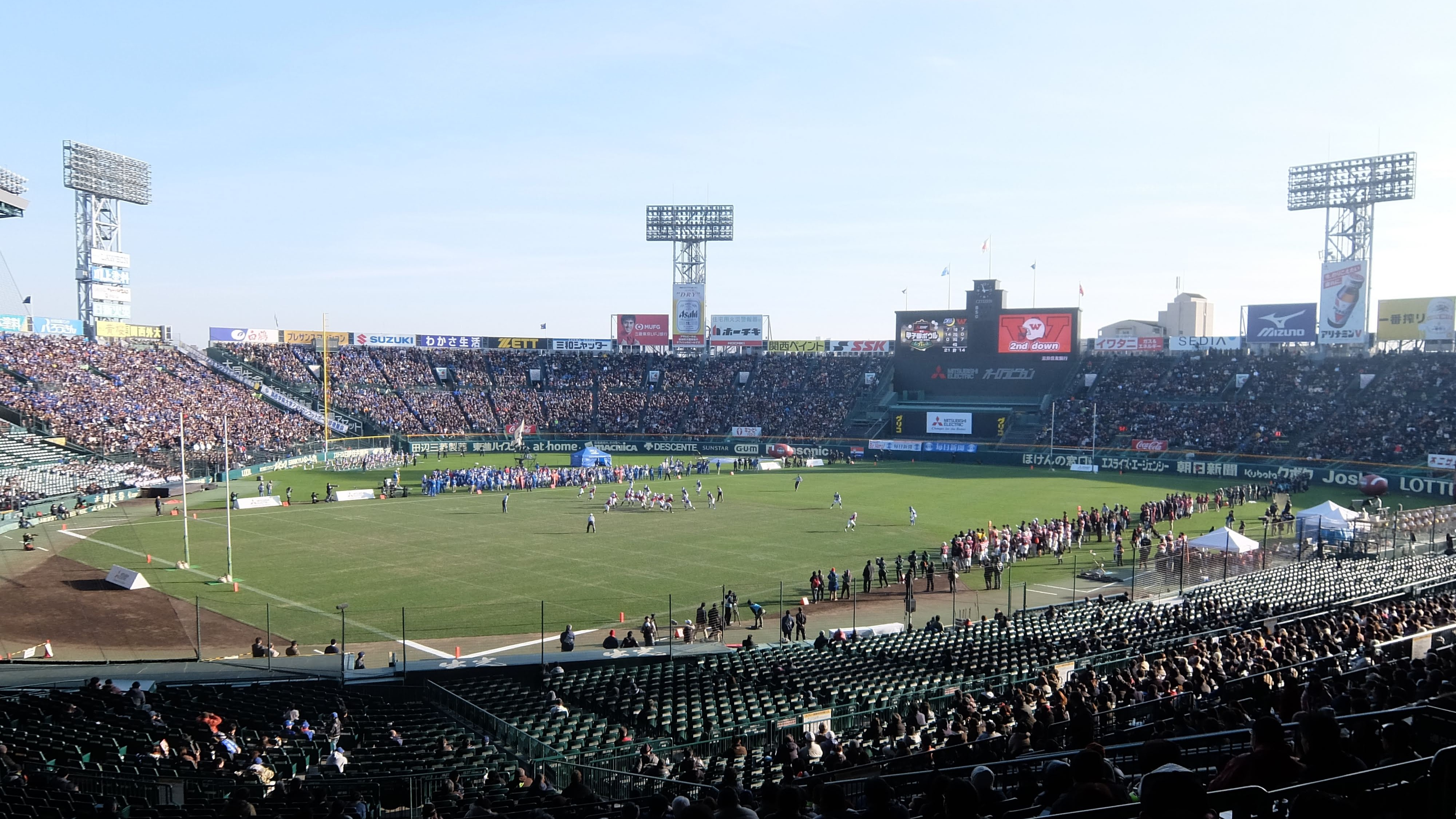

The Koshien Bowl (甲子園ボウル) is the annual Japanese American college football national championship game, usually played in December at Koshien Stadium.

From the 1949 season until 2008 season, the game was held as the final game of Japan University American Football Championship. From the 2008 season until 2023, the game was held between 2 universities from East Japan (Hokkaido, Tohoku, Kanto) and West Japan (Tokai, Hokuriku, Kansai, Chushikoku, Kyushu).

On December 4th, 2023, the Japan American Football Association announced it will move the Japan University American Football Championship to a 12 team format, eliminating regional matchups in favor of a mixed-conference bracket which began in 2024.

Kwansei Gakuin University Fighters is the most successful team with 34 titles (4 shared). Nihon University Phoenix is second with 21 titles (2 shared).

== Game results ==
Season	Date Played	Kanto	Score	Kansai	Note	
1946	1947 April 13	Keio	45-0	Doshisha		
1947	1948 January 1	Meiji	0-6	Kansai		
1948	1949 January 9	Keio	14-7	Kansai		
1949	1949 December 18	Keio	7-25	Kwansei Gakuin		
1950	1950 December 10	Keio	6-20	Kwansei Gakuin		
1951	1951 December 9	Rikkyo	19-14	Kwansei Gakuin		
1952	1952 December 7	Rikkyo	20-0	Kwansei Gakuin		
1953	1953 December 6	Rikkyo	7-19	Kwansei Gakuin		
1954	1954 December 5	Rikkyo	7-15	Kwansei Gakuin		
1955	1955 November 23	Nihon	26-26	Kwansei Gakuin	Draw	
1956	1956 November 23	Nihon	0-33	Kwansei Gakuin		
1957	1957 November 24	Nihon	14-6	Kwansei Gakuin		
1958	1958 December 7	Nihon	13-12	Kwansei Gakuin		
1959	1959 December 6	Nihon	42-0	Kwansei Gakuin		
1960	1960 December 4	Rikkyo	36-16	Kwansei Gakuin	held at Nishinomiya Stadium	
1961	1961 December 10	Nihon	14-6	Kwansei Gakuin		
1962	1962 December 2	Nihon	28-24	Kwansei Gakuin		
1963	1963 December 8	Nihon	30-18	Kwansei Gakuin		
1964	1965 January 15	Nihon	48-14	Kwansei Gakuin		
1965	1965 December 5	Rikkyo	22-22	Kwansei Gakuin	Draw	
1966	1966 December 4	Nihon	40-12	Kwansei Gakuin		
1967	1967 December 10	Nihon	12-31	Kwansei Gakuin		
1968	1968 December 15	Meiji	36-38	Kwansei Gakuin		
1969	1969 December 14	Nihon	30-14	Kwansei Gakuin		
1970	1970 December 13	Nihon	6-34	Kwansei Gakuin		
1971	1971 December 12	Nihon	28-22	Kwansei Gakuin		
1972	1972 December 10	Hosei	34-20	Kwansei Gakuin		
1973	1973 December 9	Nihon	7-24	Kwansei Gakuin		
1974	1974 December 8	Nihon	20-28	Kwansei Gakuin		
1975	1975 December 14	Meiji	7-56	Kwansei Gakuin		
1976	1976 December 12	Meiji	22-29	Kwansei Gakuin		
1977	1977 December 11	Nihon	20-51	Kwansei Gakuin		
1978	1978 December 10	Nihon	63-7	Kwansei Gakuin		
1979	1979 December 9	Nihon	48-0	Kwansei Gakuin		
1980	1980 December 13	Nihon	42-7	Kwansei Gakuin		
1981	1981 December 13	Nihon	42-31	Kwansei Gakuin		
1982	1982 December 12	Nihon	65-28	Kyoto		
1983	1983 December 11	Nihon	14-30	Kyoto	Starting in 1983, the winner would play an X-League team in the Rice Bowl.	
1984	1984 December 9	Nihon	42-42	Kwansei Gakuin	Draw; Nihon participated in the Rice Bowl	
1985	1985 December 8	Meiji	46-48	Kwansei Gakuin		
1986	1986 December 14	Nihon	28-49	Kyoto		
1987	1987 December 13	Nihon	17-41	Kyoto		
1988	1988 December 11	Nihon	35-28	Kwansei Gakuin		
1989	1989 December 17	Nihon	45-14	Kwansei Gakuin		
1990	1990 December 16	Nihon	34-7	Kyoto		
1991	1991 December 15	Senshu	20-25	Kwansei Gakuin		
1992	1992 December 13	Hosei	7-17	Kyoto		
1993	1993 December 19	Nippon Sports Science	10-35	Kwansei Gakuin		
1994	1994 December 18	Hosei	22-24	Ritsumeikan		
1995	1995 December 17	Hosei	17-24	Kyoto		
1996	1996 December 15	Hosei	21-28	Kyoto		
1997	1997 December 20	Hosei	21-21	Kwansei Gakuin	Draw; Hosei participated in the Rice Bowl	
1998	1998 December 19	Hosei	17-25	Ritsumeikan		
1999	1999 December 19	Hosei	13-52	Kwansei Gakuin		
2000	17 December 2000	Hosei	28-21	Kwansei Gakuin		
2001	16 December 2001	Hosei	6-24	Kwansei Gakuin		
2002	15 December 2002	Waseda	14-51	Ritsumeikan		
2003	21 December 2003	Hosei	6-61	Ritsumeikan		
2004	19 December 2004	Hosei	17-38	Ritsumeikan		
2005	18 December 2005	Hosei	17-14	Ritsumeikan		
2006	17 December 2006	Hosei	45-43	Kwansei Gakuin		
2007	16 December 2007	Nihon	38-41	Kwansei Gakuin	held at Nagai Stadium	
2008	21 December 2008	Hosei	8-19	Ritsumeikan	held at Nagai Stadium	
Season	Date Played	East Japan	Score	West Japan	Attendance	Note
2009	13 December 2009	Hosei	38-50	Kansai		
2010	19 December 2010	Waseda	21-48	Ritsumeikan	29,000	
2011	18 December 2011	Nihon	3-24	Kwansei Gakuin	35,000	
2012	16 December 2012	Hosei	17-20	Kwansei Gakuin	29,000	
2013	15 December 2013	Nihon	9-23	Kwansei Gakuin	32,000	
2014	14 December 2014	Nihon	10-55	Kwansei Gakuin	32,000	
2015	13 December 2015	Waseda	27-28	Ritsumeikan	33,000	
2016	12 December 2016	Waseda	14-31	Kwansei Gakuin	35,000	
2017	13 December 2017	Nihon	23-17	Kwansei Gakuin	36,000	
2018	16 December 2018	Waseda	20-37	Kwansei Gakuin	-	
2019	15 December 2019	Waseda	28-38	Kwansei Gakuin	-	
2020	13 December 2020	Nihon	24-42	Kwansei Gakuin	-	
2021	19 December 2021	Hosei	7-47	Kwansei Gakuin	-	
Season	Date Played	Champion	Score	Runner-up	Attendance	Note
2022	18 December 2022	Kwansei Gakuin	34-17	Waseda	16,000	Removing the "East Japan" and "West Japan" frameworks
2023	17 December 2023	Kwansei Gakuin	61-21	Hosei	18,000	
2024	15 December 2024	Ritsumeikan	45-35	Hosei	19,000	
2025	14 December 2025	Ritsumeikan	38-14	Kwansei Gakuin	24,000	The first-ever all-Kansai final: Kwansei Gakuin (Kansai #1) vs. Ritsumeikan (Kansai #2).

== Winners ==
In Italics title shared.

Rank	University	Region	Wins	Years won
1	Kwansei Gakuin Fighters	Hyōgo	34	1949, 1950, 1953, 1954, 1955, 1956, 1965, 1967, 1968, 1970, 1973, 1974, 1975, 1976, 1977, 1984, 1985, 1991, 1993, 1997, 1999, 2001, 2007, 2011, 2012, 2013, 2014, 2016, 2018, 2019, 2020, 2021, 2022, 2023
2	Nihon Phoenix	Tokyo	21	1955, 1957, 1958, 1959, 1961, 1962, 1963, 1964, 1966, 1969, 1971, 1978, 1979, 1980, 1981, 1982, 1984, 1988, 1989, 1990, 2017
3	Ritsumeikan Panthers	Kyoto	10	1994, 1998, 2002, 2003, 2004, 2008, 2010, 2015, 2024, 2025
4	Kyoto University	Kyoto	6	1983, 1986, 1987, 1992, 1995, 1996
5	Hosei University	Tokyo	5	1972, 1997, 2000, 2005, 2006
6	Rikkyo University	Tokyo	4	1951, 1952, 1960, 1965
7	Keio Unicorns	Tokyo	2	1946, 1948
7	Kansai University	Osaka	2	1947, 2009

== See also ==
- College Football Playoff National Championship
