= Tokyo Bowl =

- Tokyo Bowl
- Conference tie-ins: Kansai Collegiate American Football League, Kantoh Collegiate American Football Association

Sponsors
- Leverages

The Tokyo Bowl is an annual American college football bowl game, usually played in December in Tokyo, Japan. The game matches up the 2nd place team from the Kansai Collegiate American Football League and the 2nd place team from the Kantoh Collegiate American Football Association. In 2024, the bowl returned to the schedule as a national championship semifinal alongside the Nagai Bowl, featuring teams from the Kanto conference champion's side of the bracket.

== Game results ==
Game	Kansai League Representative		Kanto League Representative		Site
2014	Ritsumeikan	41	Hosei	7	Ajinomoto Stadium
2015	Kwansei Gakuin	17	Nihon	17	Fujitsu Stadium
2016	Ritsumeikan	44	Keio	6	Yokohama Stadium
2017	Kyoto		Hosei		Fujitsu Stadium
2024	Kwansei Gakuin	17	Hosei	20	Spears Edorik Field
