= Toshiki Sato (gridiron football) =

Japanese gridiron football player (born 1993)

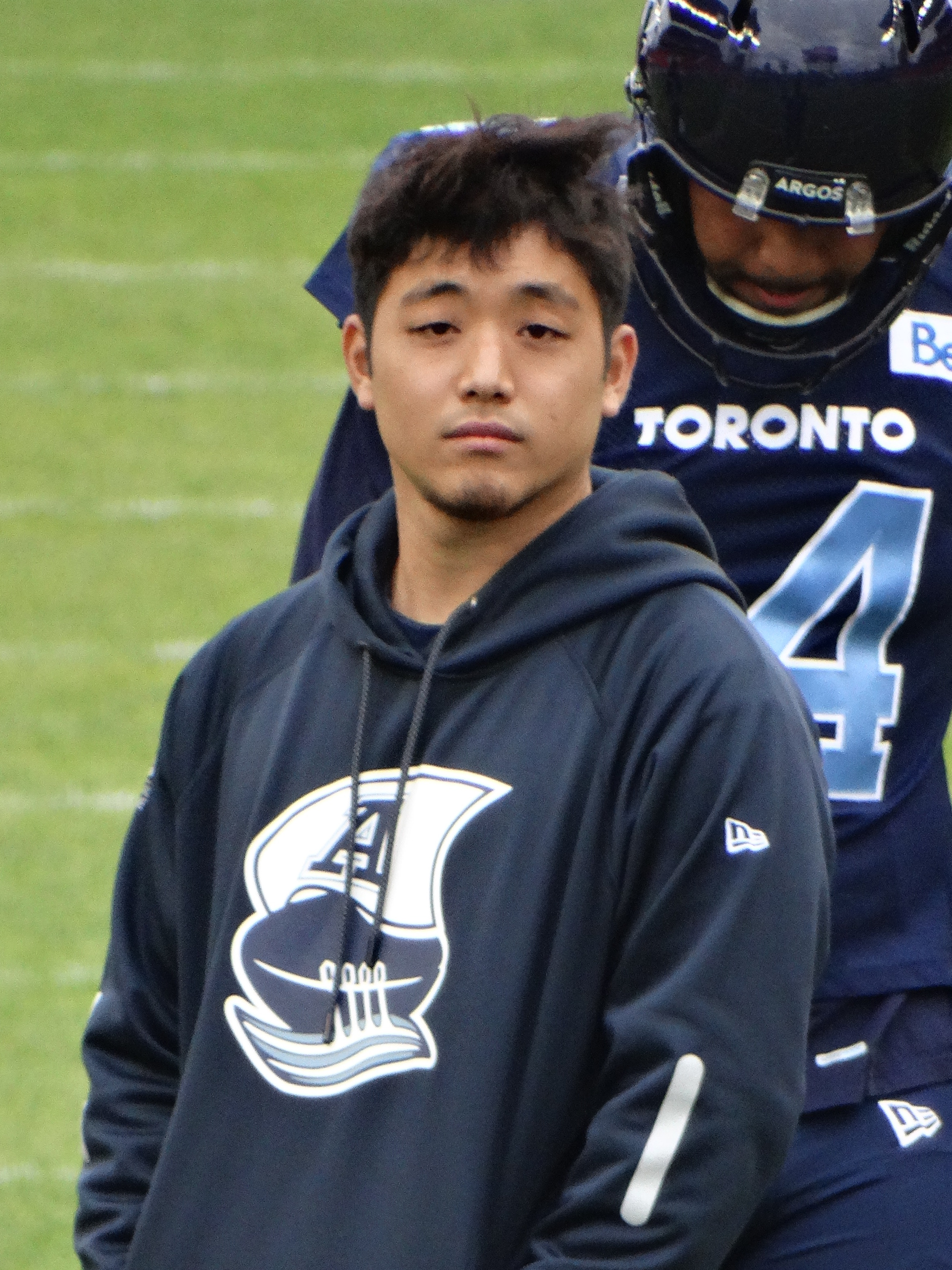
- Sato with the Toronto Argonauts in 2022

Profile
- Positions: Placekicker, punter

Personal information
- Born: September 30, 1993 (age 33); Yokohama, Japan
- Listed height: 5 ft 10 in (1.78 m)
- Listed weight: 180 lb (82 kg)

Career information
- College: Waseda

Career history
- 2016–2019: IBM Big Blue
- 2021–2022: Toronto Argonauts
- 2023–2024: Calgary Stampeders*
- 2025: Edmonton Elks*
- * Offseason or practice squad member only

Awards and highlights
- Grey Cup champion (2022); All-X-League (2019)
- Stats at CFL.ca

Toshiki Sato (born September 30, 1993) is a Japanese professional gridiron football placekicker and punter. He played college football at Waseda. He has been a member of the Toronto Argonauts, Calgary Stampeders, and Edmonton Elks of the Canadian Football League (CFL), and the IBM Big Blue of the X-League.

== Early life ==
Sato was born in Yokohama, Japan.

== College career ==
Sato played four years of college football for the Waseda Big Bears of Waseda University in Shinjuku, Japan. With three seconds remaining in the 2015 Koshien Bowl, Sato missed a 52-yard field goal as Wasada lost to the 2015 Ritsumeikan Panthers by a score of 28–27.

== Professional career ==
=== X-League ===
Sato played for the IBM Big Blue of the X-League from 2016 to 2019. In 2019, he earned All-X-League honors and also set a league record with a 58-yard field goal.

=== The Spring League ===
Sato played for the Austin Generals of The Spring League (TSL) in 2019 and the Aviators of the TSL in 2020.

=== Toronto Argonauts ===
Sato was selected by the Toronto Argonauts of the Canadian Football League (CFL) in the second round, with the 16th overall pick, of the 2021 CFL global draft. He signed with the team on April 20, 2021. He spent the majority of the 2021 season on the practice roster but was promoted to the active roster for the final game of the regular season. In that game, Sato punted nine times for 311 yards, kicked off twice for 116 yards, scored a rouge and missed one extra point as the Argonauts lost 13–7 to the Edmonton Elks. He was released on December 5 and re-signed by the Argonauts on December 30, 2021.

Sato was released by the Argonauts on May 29, 2022, and signed to the practice roster on June 5, 2022. He remained on the practice roster for the duration of the season, including when the Argonauts won the 109th Grey Cup by defeating the Winnipeg Blue Bombers by a score of 24–23. His practice roster contract expired on November 21, 2022.

=== Calgary Stampeders ===
Sato signed with the Calgary Stampeders of the CFL on February 6, 2023. He was moved to the practice roster on June 3, 2023. He was released by the Stampeders on November 5, 2023. Sato was signed to the practice roster again on June 2, 2024. He remained on the practice roster for the entire season and his contract expired on October 27, 2024.

=== Edmonton Elks ===
Sato joined the Edmonton Elks on March 21, 2025. He was released on May 9, 2025.
