= 2015 college football season =

2015 college football season may refer to:

== American leagues ==
- 2015 NCAA Division I FBS football season
- 2015 NCAA Division I FCS football season
- 2015 NCAA Division II football season
- 2015 NCAA Division III football season
- 2015 NAIA football season

== Non-American leagues ==
- 2015 Japan college football season
- 2015 CIS football season
