= Kanazawa Evergreen football =

2017 Kanazawa Evergreen football team
- First season: 1981
- Location: Kanazawa
- Conference: Hokuriku Collegiate American Football League
- Division: Division 1
- Colors: Green and Gold
- Website: http://evergreen07.web.fc2.com/

The Kanazawa Evergreen football program, established in 1981, represents Kanazawa University in college football. Kanazawa is a member of the Hokuriku Collegiate American Football League.
