= International University Bowl =

American Football Bowl

- Stadium: Estadio Olímpico Universitario
- Location: Mexico City, Mexico
- Operated: 2016–present

The International University Bowl (Spanish: Tazón Internacional Universitario) is a collegiate American football bowl game that is played annually at Estadio Olímpico Universitario in Mexico City since 2016.

== Game results ==
Date	Winning team	Score	Losing team	Score	Attendance	Notes
June 25, 2016	Kwansei Gakuin Fighters	17	Pumas Dorados de la UNAM	13	15,000	
August 12, 2017	Pumas Dorados de la UNAM	35	Europe Warriors	32	16,000	
