= Takashi Awamori =

Japanese politician (1939–2023)

- 粟森 喬

Member of the House of Councillors
- In office 23 July 1989 – 22 July 1995
- Preceded by: Hitoshi Shimazaki
- Succeeded by: Hiroshi Hase
- Constituency: Ishikawa at-large

Personal details
- Born: 1 January 1939; Ishikawa Prefecture, Japan
- Died: 24 March 2023 (aged 84); Kanazawa, Ishikawa, Japan
- Political party: Socialist
- Education: Kanazawa University High School
- Occupation: Businessman

Takashi Awamori (Japanese: 粟森喬 Awamori Takashi; 1 January 1939 – 24 March 2023) was a Japanese businessman and politician. A member of the Japan Socialist Party, he served in the House of Councillors from 1989 to 1995.

Awamori died on 24 March 2023, at the age of 84.
