= Hokuriku Collegiate American Football League =

- Founded: 1982
- Region: Hokuriku, Japan
- Website: www.facebook.com/hrcafa hokurikugakuseifoo.wixsite.com/mysite

The Hokuriku Collegiate American Football League (北陸学生アメリカンフットボール連盟) is a college football league made up of colleges and universities in the Hokuriku region of Japan. The winner of the Hokuriku league participates in the postseason on the West Japan side of the bracket.

== History ==
In 1973, the "Kinki" block of the Kansai Collegiate American Football League was founded with the University of Fukui and the Kanazawa Institute of Technology as members. In 1982, Fukui and KIT split from the Kansai League to form the Hokuriku League.

== Member schools ==
| Institution | 日本語 | Location | Founded | Type | Enrollment | Nickname | Colors |
|---|---|---|---|---|---|---|---|
| Fukui Prefectural University | 福井県立大学 | Eiheiji, Fukui | 1992 | Public | | Wilders | |
| Kanazawa University | 金沢大学 | Kanazawa, Ishikawa | 1949 | National | 11,000 | Evergreen | |
| University of Toyama | 富山大学 | Toyama, Toyama | 1875 | National | 9,200 | Firebulls | |
| University of Fukui | 福井大学 | Fukui, Fukui | 1949 | National | 4,177 | Silver Phoenix | |
| Kanazawa Institute of Technology | 金沢工業大学 | Nonoichi, Ishikawa | 1965 | Private | | Eagles | |

== Year-by-year standings ==
| Year | 1 | 2 | 3 | 4 | 5 |
|---|---|---|---|---|---|
| 2009 | Kanazawa | KIT | Fukui Prefectural | Fukui | Toyama |
| 2010 | Kanazawa | Fukui Prefectural | Fukui | KIT | Toyama |
| 2011 | Kanazawa | Fukui Prefectural | Fukui | Toyama | KIT |
| 2012 | Kanazawa | Fukui | Fukui Prefectural | Toyama | KIT |
| 2013 | Fukui Prefectural | Kanazawa | Toyama | Fukui | KIT |
| 2014 | Fukui Prefectural | Kanazawa | Toyama | Fukui | KIT |
| 2015 | Fukui Prefectural | Kanazawa | Toyama | Fukui | KIT |
| 2016 | Fukui Prefectural | Kanazawa | Fukui | Toyama | KIT |
| 2017 | Kanazawa | Fukui Prefectural | Fukui | Toyama | KIT |
