= Nihon Phoenix football =

2023 Nihon Phoenix football team
- First season: 1940
- Last season: 2023
- Location: Tokyo, Japan
- Conference: Kantoh Collegiate American Football Association
- Division: Division 1 (Top 8)
- Colors: Red and White

National championships
- Claimed: 21

Conference championships
- 35
- Website: NihonPhoenix.com

The Nihon Phoenix football program, established in 1940, represented Nihon University in college football from 1940 until 2023. A member of the Kantoh Collegiate American Football Association, Nihon Phoenix football was a powerhouse in Japan's college football along with the Kwansei Gakuin University Fighters for four decades.

In December 2023 Nihon University disbanded the team after several students from the team were arrested on suspicion of using cannabis.

== Features ==
Nihon has won the Koshien Bowl 21 times, including 5 in a row when Mikio Shinotake was the team's head coach. Shinotake adopted the shotgun formation as the team's basic offensive formation. He often had played the team's best athlete as a quarterback in the formation, and the QB played dual roles of both quarterback and tailback. The strategy worked very well because size and power of Japanese defenders had not been big nor strong enough to injure QB, defenders confused whether QB intended to pass the ball or keep the ball for QB draw. Nihon sometimes used the Dragonfly formation which is a variation of the shotgun formation where two quarterbacks are aligned at the same time. These QBs also play dual roles of QB and tailback, then it is almost the same as if four players were aligned in the backfield. Nihon scored two touchdowns using the formation against the College of William & Mary at the Ivy Bowl in 1993.

The Phoenix have also won the Rice Bowl four times.

== Controversies ==
=== 2018: Dirty tackle ===
The Nihon University Phoenix has played friendly exhibition games against the Kwansei Gakuin University Fighters for forty years, and during an exhibition match on May 6, 2018, a defensive player of Phoenix tackled a quarterback of Fighters from behind at least two seconds after throwing an incomplete-pass. The quarterback was forced to leave the game. Also, the defender committed three fouls in the match. However, he was in tears at the bench after substituted off. Just after the match, the Phoenix head coach commented on the defender's plays as if he approved of the fouls or encouraged the players to commit them. This dangerous illegal late-hit and the coach's comment stirred a national controversy.

Ex-NFL line-backer Masafumi Kawaguchi pointed out that he'd never seen anything like the late-hit that became a problem. The Kwansei Gakuin University formally protested to the Nihon University, and accused Nihon of intentionally trying to hurt the quarterback. Daichi Suzuki, the chief of the government's Japan Sports Agency, launched an inquiry and called the play into question.

The quarterback was damaged in his spine. The defender who injured him was obviously ordered to make dirty tackles by Nihon Phoenix coaches, and later admitted it in public according to his conscience. The head coach of Nihon, nevertheless, denied that he had ordered his players to play dirty and resigned as coach without giving veracity in explain. Anger spread in nation-wide.

Reporters of New York Times speculated that this controversy related to deep-rooted cultural dynamics including what the Japanese call “power hara”.

=== 2023: Cannabis possession ===
In August 2023 police searched a dormitory linked to Nihon Phoenix on suspicion of possession of cannabis, after the university found pieces of a plant and pills there the previous month. The university suspended the team's activities in September after a member of the team, 21-year-old Noriyasu Kitabatake, was arrested on suspicion of possessing a stimulant. The following month a second player, 21-year-old Akira Yabe, was arrested for allegedly violating Japan's special drug law. Around the same time, it was reported that notes from an August meeting of university executives suggested ten or more members of the team may have used cannabis.

On November 22, 2023, the board of Nihon University recommended the resignation of President Takeo Sakai and Vice President Yasuhiro Sawada to take responsibility for the cannabis scandal, while Mariko Hayashi, chair of the Board of Trustees, agreed to a 50% pay cut. In their recommendation, the board cited an independent investigative report stating that the university waited twelve days between discovering the suspected cannabis products and contacting police, resulting in the loss of public trust in the university. Sakai and Sawada's resignations were later formalized effective March 31, 2024 and December 31, 2023, respectively. On November 27 police arrested a third player of the team, 21-year-old Rinto Fujitsu, on suspicion of purchasing illegal drugs.

== Disbandment ==
On November 29, 2023, two days after the third cannabis-related arrest, Japanese news sources reported that Nihon University was planning to disband its American football team after a history of 83 years. On December 15, in an extraordinary session of the board of directors, Nihon University formally announced the disbandment of the team. The decision came despite appeals from current members of the American football team, as well as petitions to reconsider the disbandment submitted both by them and their rivals from Kwansei Gakuin University.
