= Kanazawa University High School =

Secondary school in Ishikawa, Japan

Coordinates: 36°32′19.3″N 136°39′51.6″E

Kanazawa University Senior High School
- 金沢大学附属高校
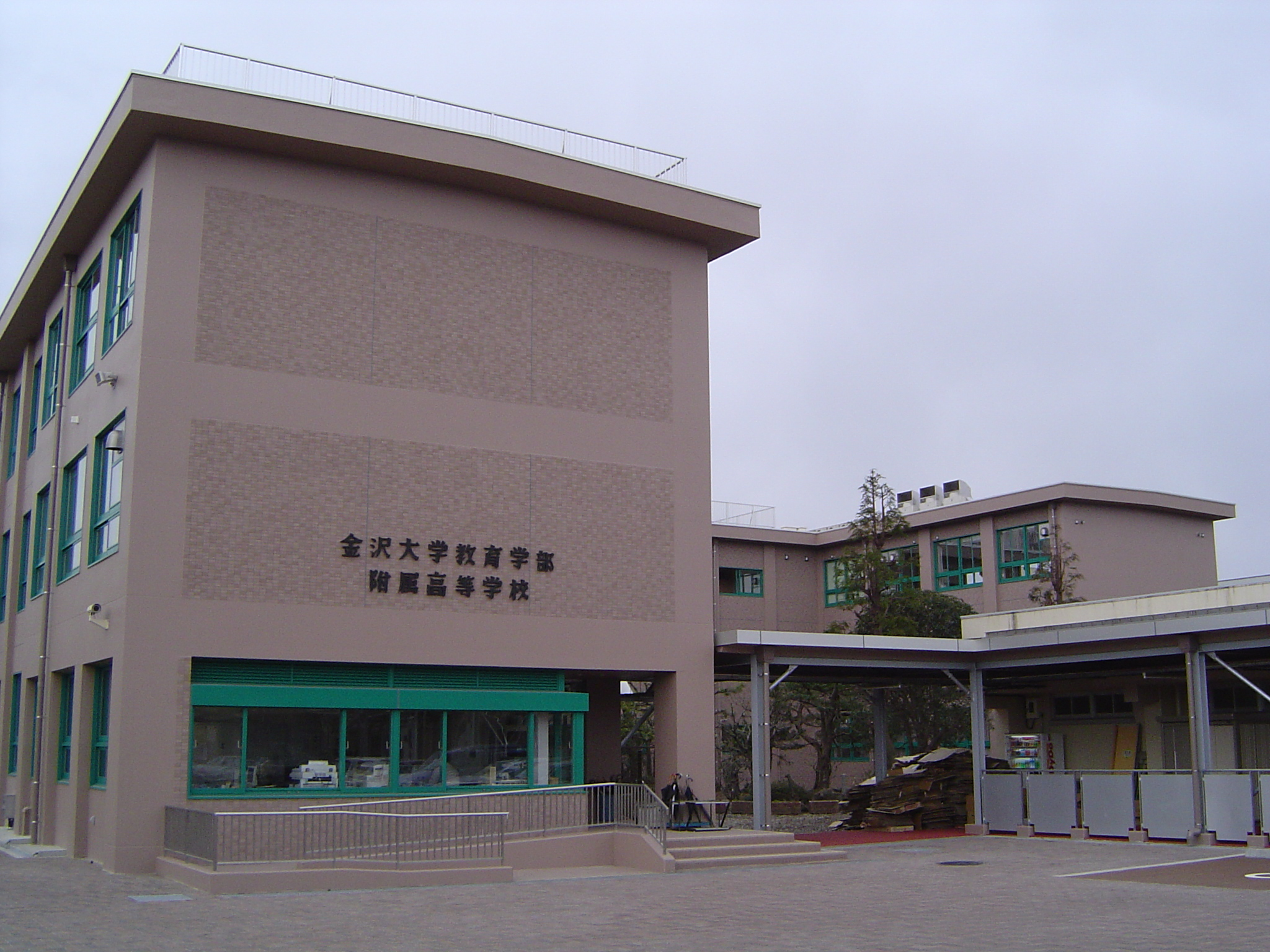

Location
- 1-1-15, Heiwa-machi, Kanazawa-shi, Ishikawa, 921-8105; Japan

Information
- Type: Senior high school (高等学校)
- Established: 1 April 1952; 73 years ago
- Founder: Kanazawa University
- Gender: Coeducation
- Affiliation: National school (state-run)
- Curriculum: Full-time; General course
- Website: partner.ed.kanazawa-u.ac.jp/kfshs/

Kanazawa University Senior High School (Japanese: 金沢大学附属高校, Hepburn: Kanazawa daigaku fuzoku kōtō gakkō) (or Attached Senior High School of the School of Teacher Education, College of Human and Social Sciences, National University Corporation Kanazawa University (国立大学法人金沢大学人間社会学域学校教育学類附属高等学校, Kokuritsu daigaku hōjin Kanazawa daigaku ningen shakai gakuiki gakkō kyōiku gakurui fuzoku kōtō gakkō)) is a national (state-run) high school in Kanazawa, Ishikawa, Japan.

== School life ==
- School Festival
- Kisaragi festival
- Education practice
- Club
- School trip

== Notable alumni ==
- Takashi Awamori (1939–2023), businessman and politician
- Naoki Okada (b. 1962), member of the Diet of Japan

== See also ==
- Kanazawa University
