= Kanazawa University =

Higher education institution in Ishikawa Prefecture, Japan

Coordinates: 36°33′45″N 136°39′22″E

- 金沢大学
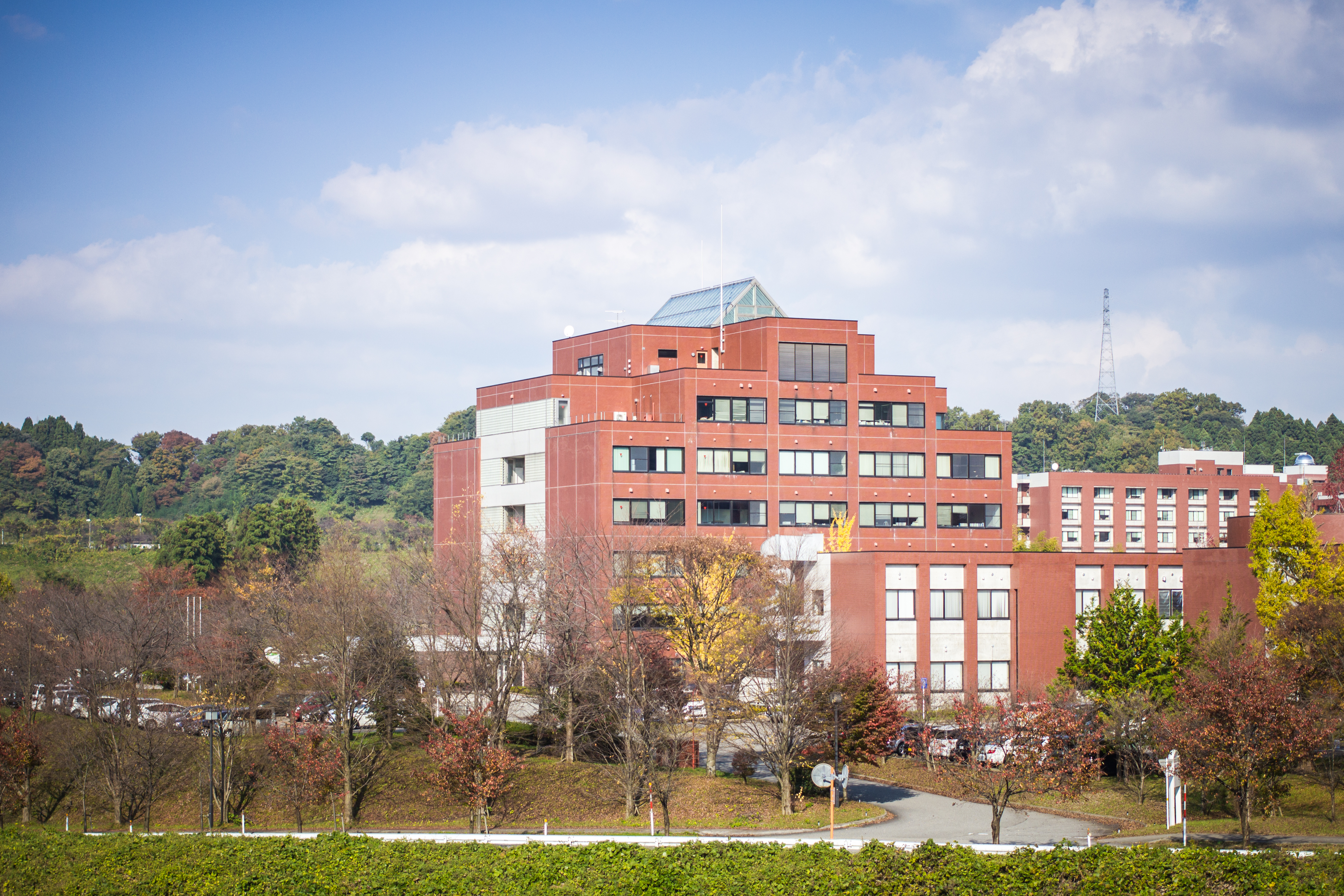
- Headquarters Building (Kakuma Campus Middle District)
- Type: Public (National)
- Established: May 1949
- President: Kōetsu Yamazaki D.Eng.
- Academic staff: 1,029 full-time （May 2021）
- Administrative staff: 447（May 2021）
- Students: approx. 10,100
- Undergraduates: 7,773（May 2021）
- Postgraduates: 2,301 (Note: Including the number of Professional Degree Course) （May 2021）
- Doctoral students: 944（May 2021）
- Location: Kakuma-machi, Kanazawa, Ishikawa, Japan
- Campus: Suburban Kakuma Campus, Takaramachi-Tsuruma Campus
- Colours: Indigo blue
- Website: www.kanazawa-u.ac.jp

Kanazawa University (Japanese: 金沢大学, romanized: Kanazawa Daigaku, abbreviated to Japanese: 金大, romanized: Kindai) is a Japanese national university in the city of Kanazawa, the capital of Ishikawa Prefecture. The university was founded in 1949, although it can trace its roots back to 1862.

Kanazawa University is divided into two main campuses: Kakuma and Takaramachi. University enrollment is about 10,100 students, including 636 international students in 2021.

== History ==
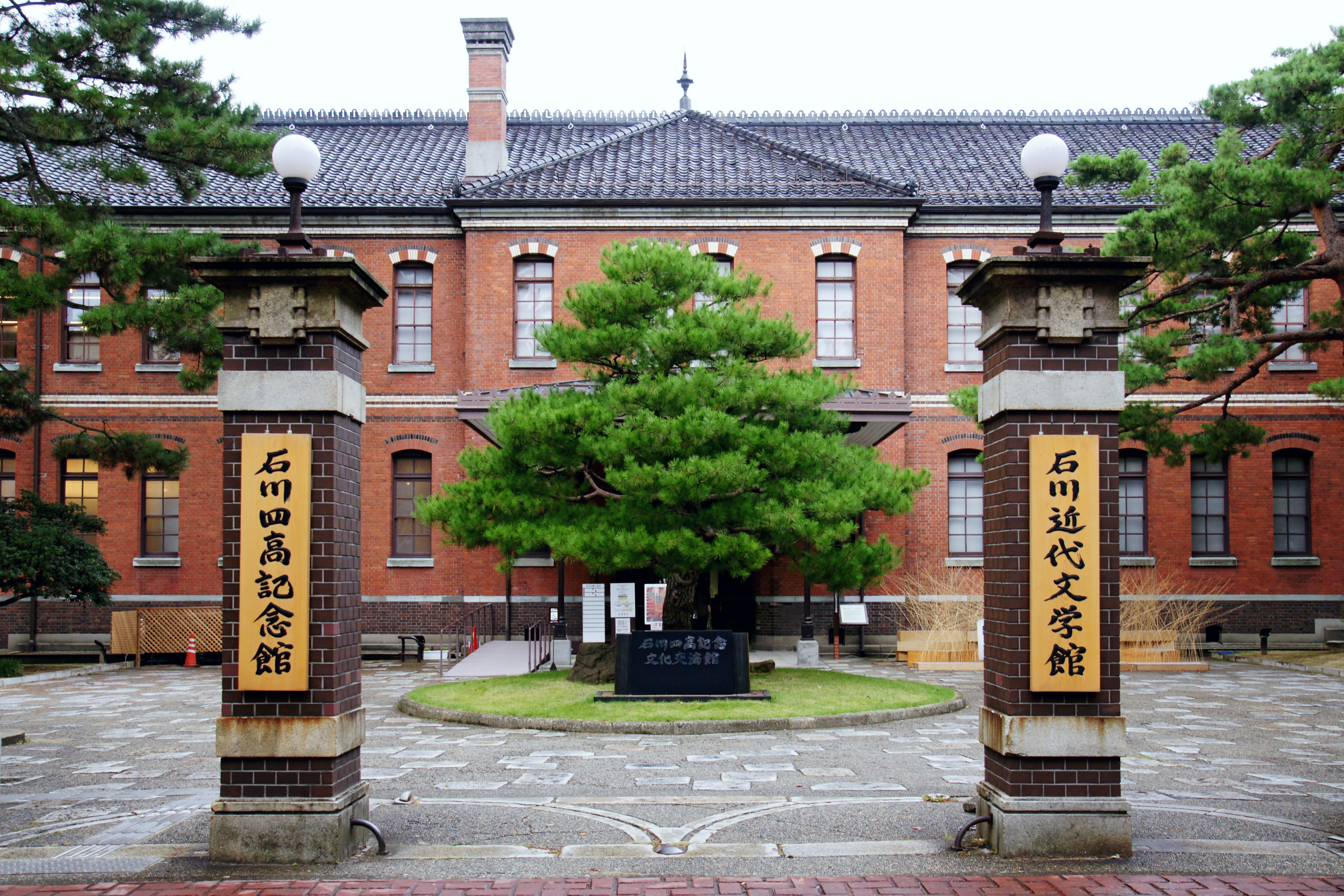
The Fourth High School Memorial Museum of Cultural Exchange, Ishikawa (former main building)

The university was founded in 1862 as an institution for smallpox vaccination (種痘所, Shutō-sho) called Hikoso Vaccination Center (彦三種痘所, Hikoso shutōsho), which was established by the Kaga Domain. In 1876 it became a medical school funded by Ishikawa Prefecture. In 1887 it became the Medical Faculty of the Fourth Higher Middle School (第四高等中学校医学部, Dai-shi kōtō chūgakkō igakubu) and then in 1894 to the Medical Faculty of the Fourth Higher School (第四高等学校医学部, Dai-shi kōtō gakkō igakubu).

In 1901 it developed into the Kanazawa Medical College (Kanazawa Medical College, Kanazawa igaku semmon gakkō) and then in 1923 to the Kanazawa Medical University (Kanazawa Medical University, Kanazawa ika daigaku). The prefectural and municipal governments wanted to promote the medical college to a comprehensive imperial university (the Medical School as its medical faculty); this was not realized before the Second World War.

In 1949, Kanazawa University was formed through the merger of Kanazawa Medical School (金沢医科大学, Kanazawa ika daigaku) and five state technical schools:

- Ishikawa Normal School (石川師範学校, Ishikawa shihan gakkō) - founded in 1874
- the Fourth Higher School (第四高等学校, Daishi kōtō gakkō) - founded in 1887
- Ishikawa Youth Normal School (石川青年師範学校, Ishikawa seinen shihan gakkō) - founded in 1918
- Kanazawa Technical College (金沢工業専門学校, Kanazawa kōgyō senmon gakkō) - 1920
- Kanazawa Higher Normal School (金沢高等師範学校, Kanazawa kōtō shihan gakkō) - founded in 1944

The former main building of the Fourth High School (built 1891), became The Fourth High School Memorial Museum of Cultural Exchange (石川四高記念文化交流館). The main campus of Kanazawa University was first located in the former Kanazawa Castle. In 1989 the larger Kakuma campus was opened and in 1994 the headquarters moved to the new campus.

=== Timeline ===
- 1949-Kanazawa University was established with Kanazawa Medical University, Fourth High School, Kanazawa Higher Normal School, Kanazawa Technical College, Ishikawa Normal School, and Ishikawa Youth Normal School as the parent body. There are 6 faculties: Faculty of Law, Faculty of Education, Faculty of Science, Faculty of Medicine, Faculty of Pharmacy, and Faculty of Engineering.
- 1968-The Tuberculosis Research Institute and the Cancer Research Facility attached to the Faculty of Medicine are integrated and the Cancer Research Institute is established.
- 1974-Established Medical Technology Junior College.
- 1980-Faculty of Law and Literature is separated and reorganized into Faculty of Letters, Faculty of Law, and Faculty of Economics.
- 1989-Faculty of Letters, Law, and Economics move to Kakuma district.
- 1992-Faculty of Education and Faculty of Science move to Kakuma district.
- 1993-The Ministry of Liberal Arts moves to the Kakuma district.
- 1994—The secretariat relocated to the Kakuma district, and the relocation from the castle district to the Kakuma district was completed.
- 1995—Established the Department of Health Sciences, and moved the attached kindergarten, elementary school, and junior high school to the Heiwacho district.
- 2004-Opened Law School.
- 2005-Faculty of Pharmacy and Engineering move to Kakuma district.
- 2006—Transferred the Faculty of Pharmacy Department of Pharmacy to a 6-year system (the Department of Comprehensive Pharmacy was abolished) and established the Department of Pharmacy Science, a 4-year department.
- 2007—Completed the complete renovation work of the attached high school.
- 2008—Reorganized all 8 faculties into 3 faculties and 16 faculties. Implementation of the Acanthus Scholarship System (Kanazawa University's unique benefit-type scholarship system for those with excellent grades).
- 2010-Acanthus scholarship system abolished. We are planning to implement a new system that expands the scope of benefits as a "student special support system".
- 2012–150 years since its foundation.
- 2016-Transition from 2 semesters to 4 semesters.
- 2018—Announced cancellation of classes for the first time in 8 years (3044 days) due to heavy snowfall.

== Basic data ==
University rankings
Global
THE	General	1001–1200
QS	General	901-950
ARWU	Research	801–900

Regional
QS Asia (Asia version)	General	210

National

=== Location ===
- Kakuma Campus ( Kakuma Town, Kanazawa City, Ishikawa Prefecture)
- Takaramachi Campus (Takaramachi, Kanazawa City, Ishikawa Prefecture)
- Tsuruma Campus ( Kodatsuno, Kanazawa City, Ishikawa Prefecture )
- Heiwamachi district (Heiwamachi, Kanazawa City, Ishikawa Prefecture)
- Higashikenroku district (Higashikenrokucho, Kanazawa City, Ishikawa Prefecture)
- Tatsunokuchi district (Nomi City, Ishikawa Prefecture )
- Kanazawa University Tokyo Office (Nihonbashi Muromachi, Chuo-ku, Tokyo)

=== Emblem ===
- The emblem of Kanazawa University shows the characters for "university" and the leaves of the acanthus, a Mediterranean plant. It was first used in August 1949. The acanthus stands for "The Fine Arts," and its graceful leaves were loved by the ancient Greeks and Romans who used them as decorations in the capitals of Corinthian and composite columns. It is said that they were grown in the garden of Plato's Akademia.
- Navy blue is used as the school color . In RGB (28,50,77).
- Thistle is the symbol of the Acanthus Portal, which is an e-learning system on campus.
- In novels and dramas, it is sometimes metaphorized under the fictitious names "Noto University" and "Ishikawa University".

== Organization ==
=== Faculties (former undergraduate programs) ===
Kanazawa University has eight faculties (学部).

- Faculty of Literature (文学部)
- Faculty of Education (教育学部)
- Faculty of Law (法学部)
- Faculty of Economics (経済学部)
- Faculty of Science (理学部)
- Faculty of Engineering (工学部)
- Faculty of Medicine (医学部)
- Faculty of Pharmaceutical Sciences (薬学部)

=== Colleges (undergraduate programs) ===
Kanazawa University has three colleges (学域) and 16 schools (学類) for undergraduate programs.

- College of Human and Social Sciences (人間社会学域)
  - School of Humanities (人文学類)
  - School of Law (法学類)
  - School of Economics (経済学類)
  - School of Teacher Education (学校教育学類)
  - School of Regional Development Studies (地域創造学類)
  - School of International Studies (国際学類)
- College of Science and Engineering (理工学域)
  - School of Mathematics and Physics (数物科学類)
  - School of Chemistry (物質化学類)
  - School of Mechanical Engineering (機械工学類)
  - School of Electrical and Computer Engineering (電子情報学類)
  - School of Environmental Design (環境デザイン学類)
  - School of Natural System (自然システム学類)
- College of Medical, Pharmaceutical and Health Sciences (医薬保健学域)
  - School of Medicine (医学類)
  - School of Pharmacy (薬学類)
  - School of Pharmaceutical Sciences (創薬科学類)
  - School of Health Sciences (保健学類)

=== Graduate schools ===
- Graduate School of Education (大学院教育学研究科)
- Graduate School of Human and Socio-Environment Studies (大学院人間社会環境研究科)
- Law School (大学院法務研究科)
- Graduate School of Natural Science and Technology (大学院自然科学研究科)
- Graduate School of Medical Science (大学院医学系研究科)

== Research facilities ==
- University Libraries (附属図書館)
  - Central Library (中央図書館)
  - Natural Science and Technology Library (自然科学系図書館)
  - Medical Branch Library (医学系分館)
- University Hospital (附属病院)
- Cancer Research Institute (がん研究所)

== Campuses ==
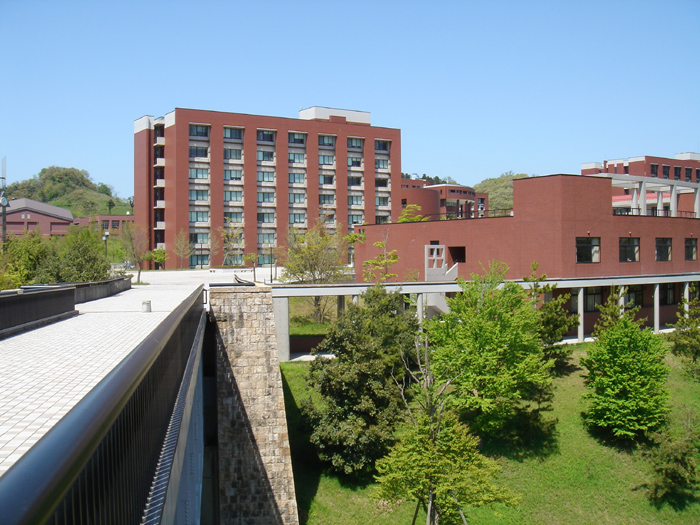
Kakuma-Campus (north area)

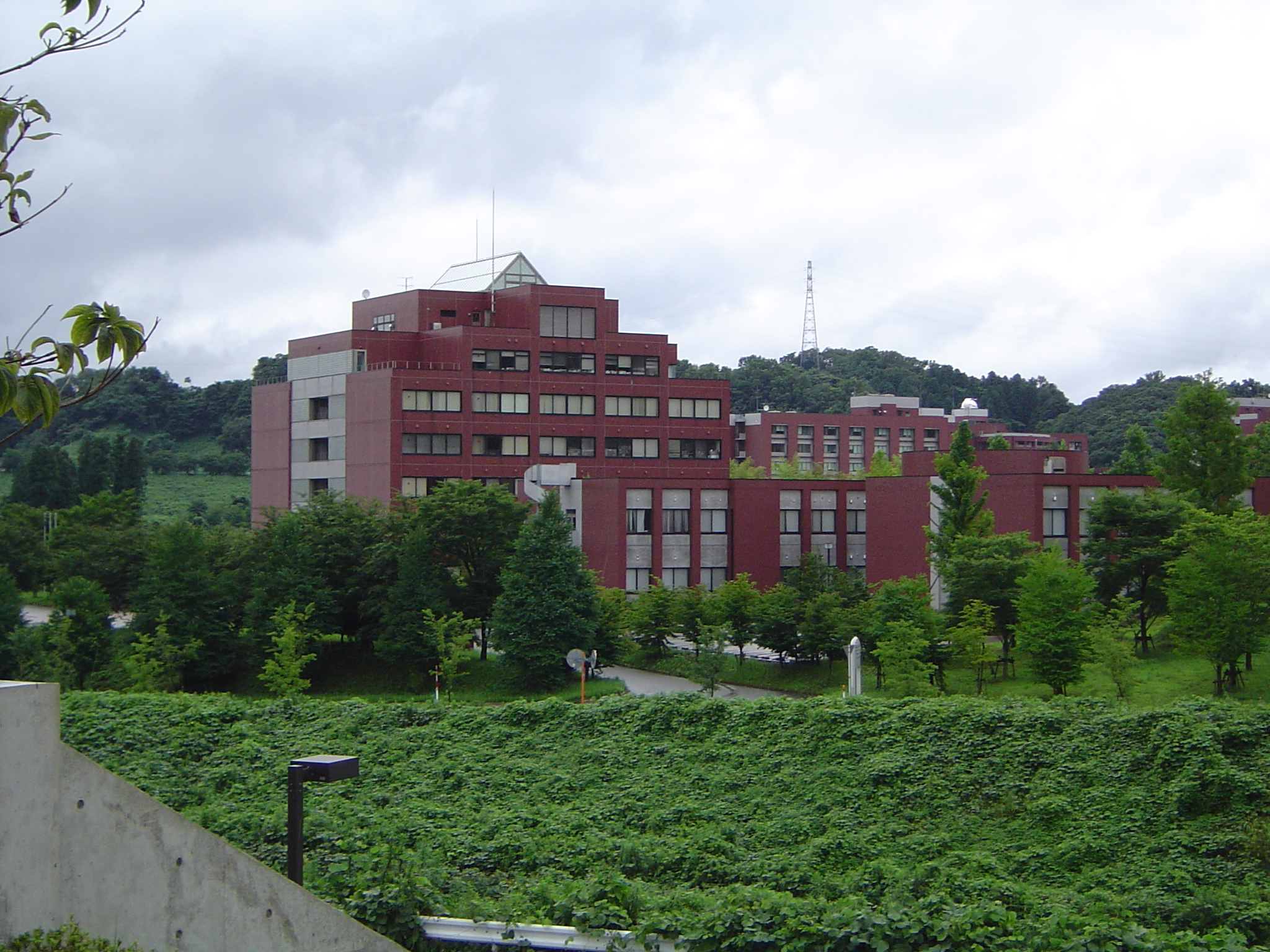
Kakuma-Campus (central area)

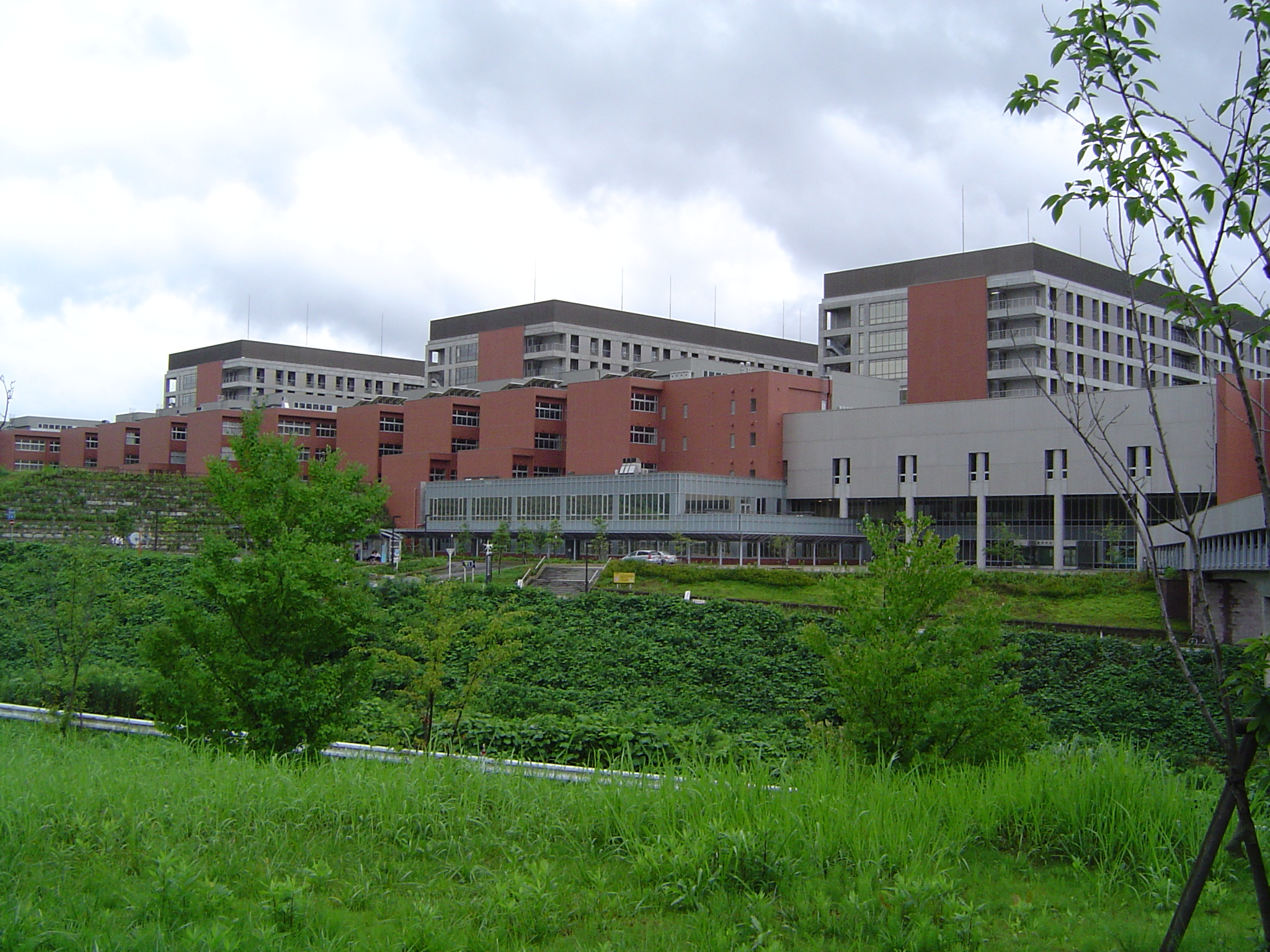
Kakum campus (south area)

=== Kakuma Campus ===
- College of Human and Social Sciences

Humanities, Law, Economics, Teacher Education, Regional Development Studies, International Studies

- College of Science and Engineering

Mathematics and Physics, Chemistry, Mechanical Engineering, Electrical and Computer Engineering, Environmental Design

- College of Medical, Pharmaceutical and Health Sciences

Pharmacy, Pharmaceutical Sciences

=== Takaramachi Tsuruma Campus ===
- College of Medical, Pharmaceutical and Health Sciences

Medicine, Health Sciences

=== Heiwamachi Campus ===
Experimental school attached to the College of Human and Social Sciences

- Kanazawa University High School

== Notable alumni ==
- Tatsuma Ejiri (1975–), manga artist
- Kohei Eto (1982–), basketball coach
- Yoshio Koide (1942–), theoretical physicist
- Ryoji Nakagawa (1939–), member of the Supreme Court of Japan
- Yoshihisa Okumura (1926–2023), an engineer
- Han Qing-quan (1884–1921), Chinese doctor
- Bunji Sakita (1930–2002), theoretical physicist
- Shirō Ishii (1892–1959), the director of Unit 731
- Mikito Takayasu (1860–1938), ophthalmologist

== Points of interest ==
- Botanic Garden, Faculty of Science, Kanazawa University

== Gallery (Kakuma Campus) ==
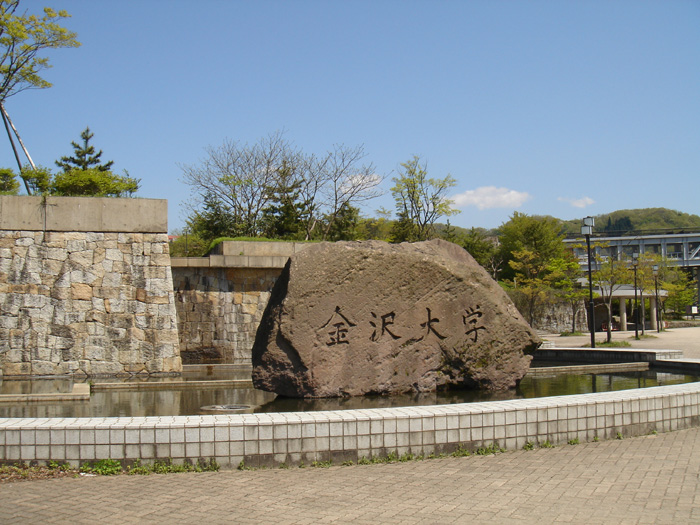

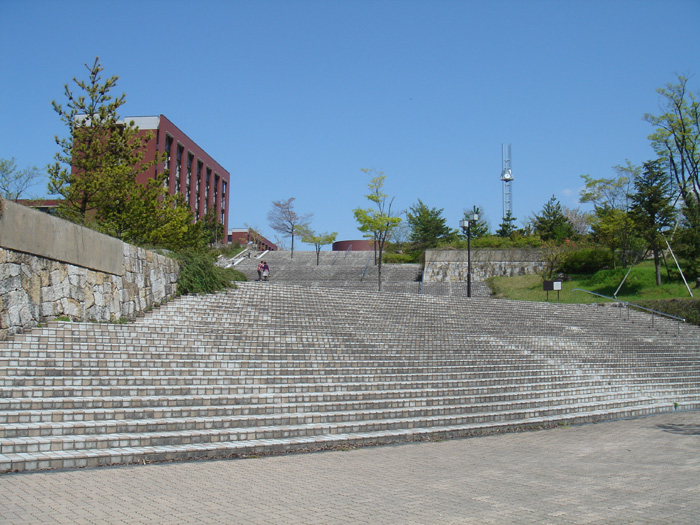

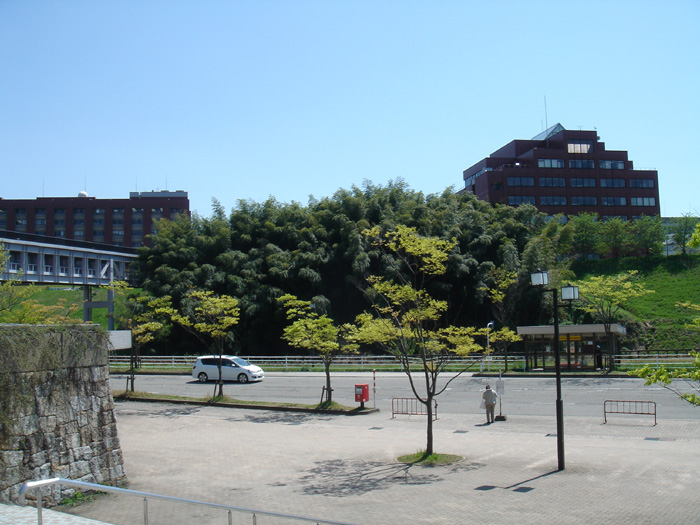

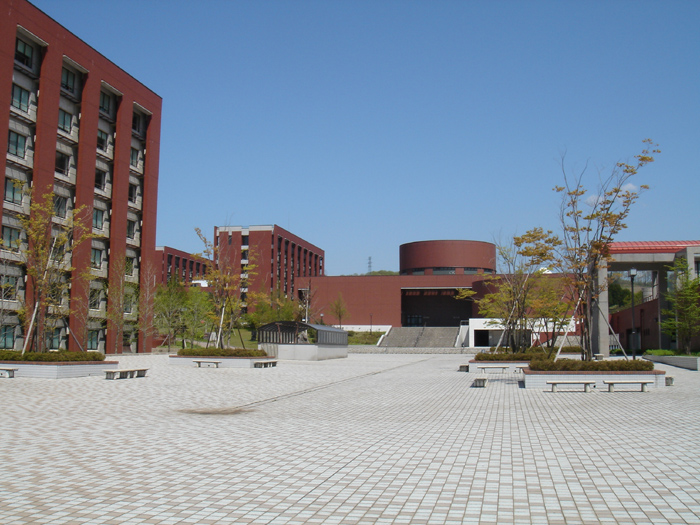

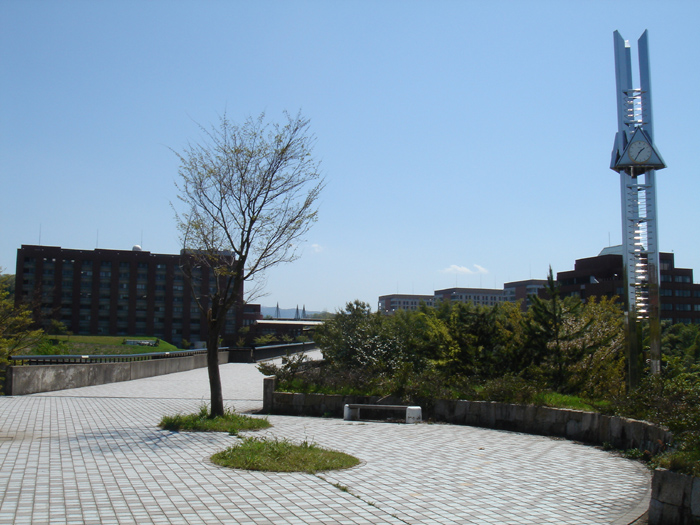

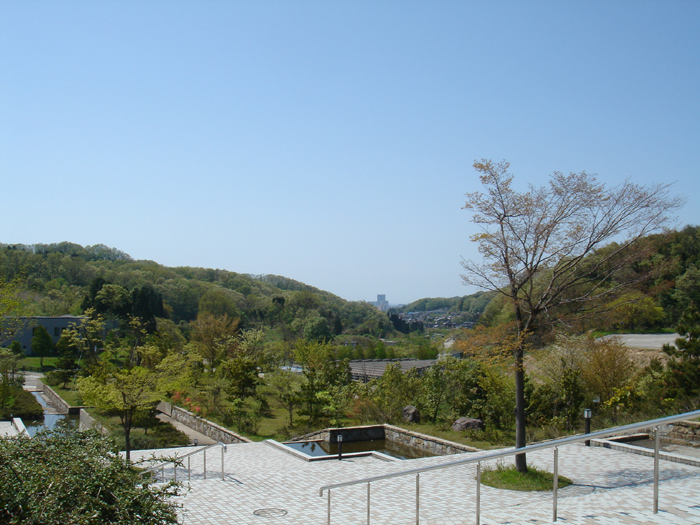

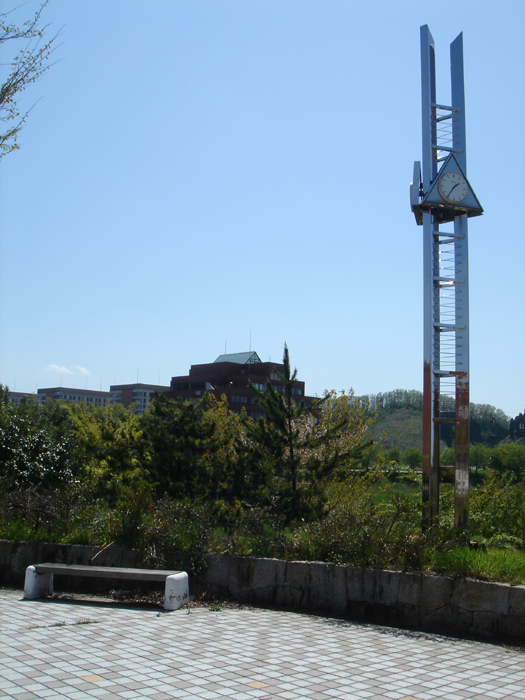

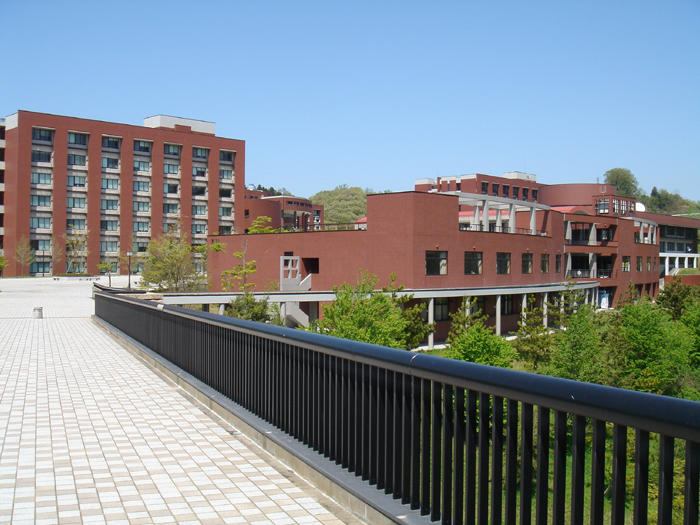

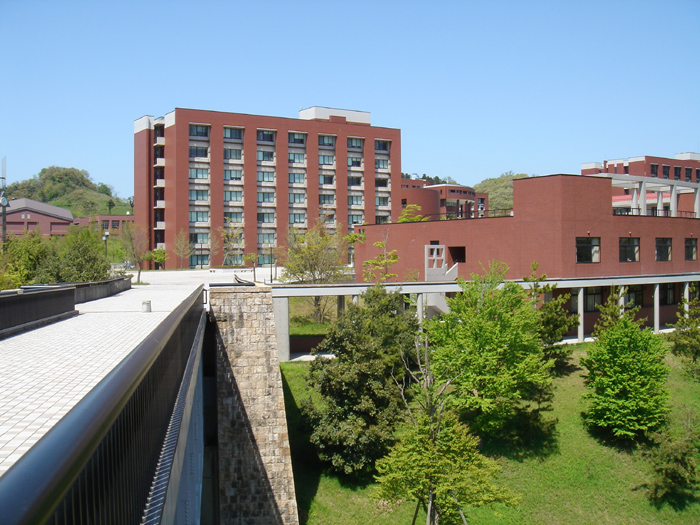

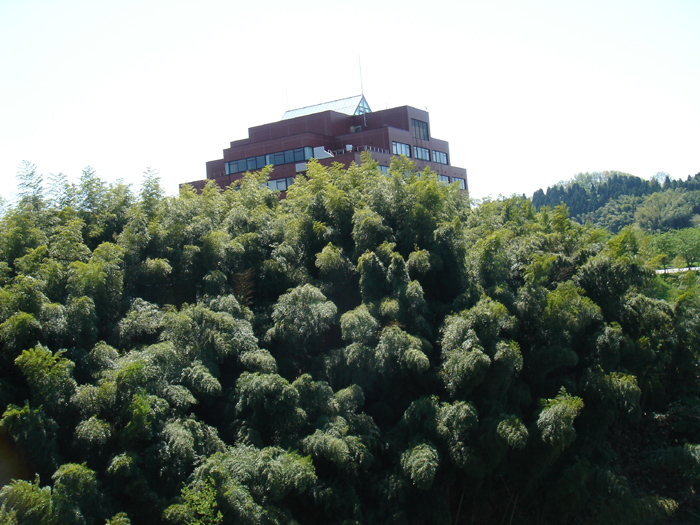

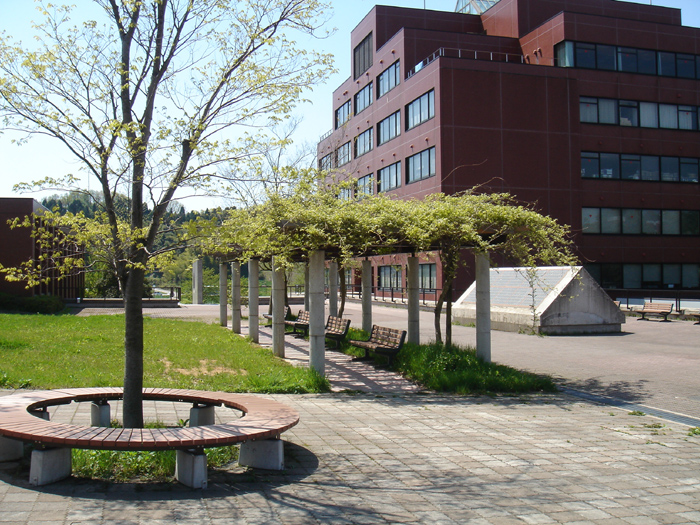

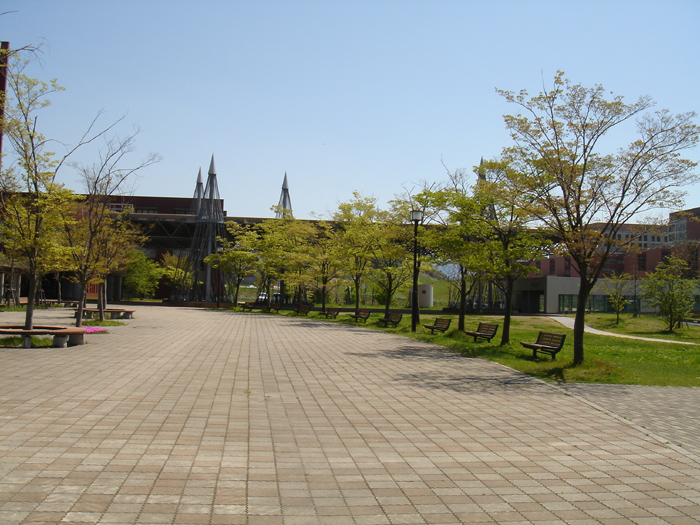

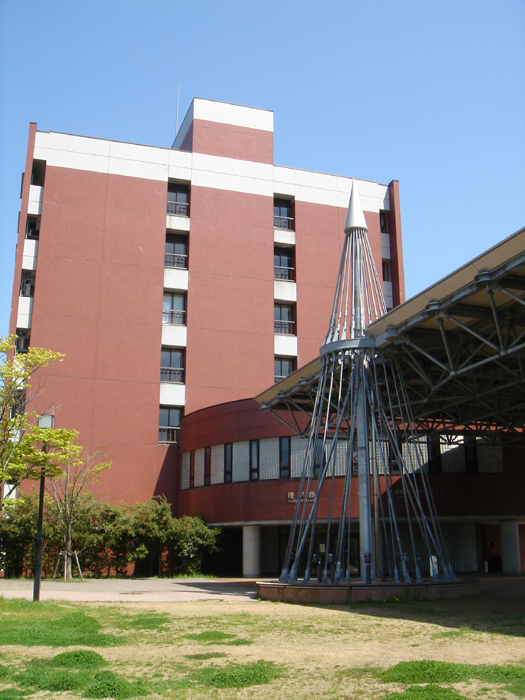

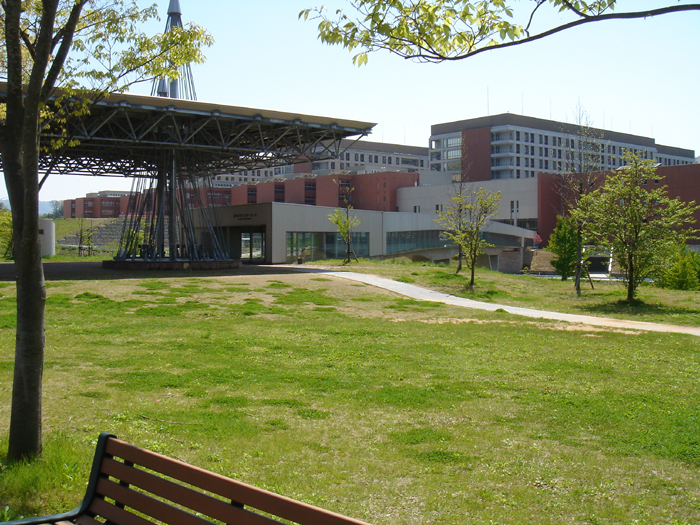

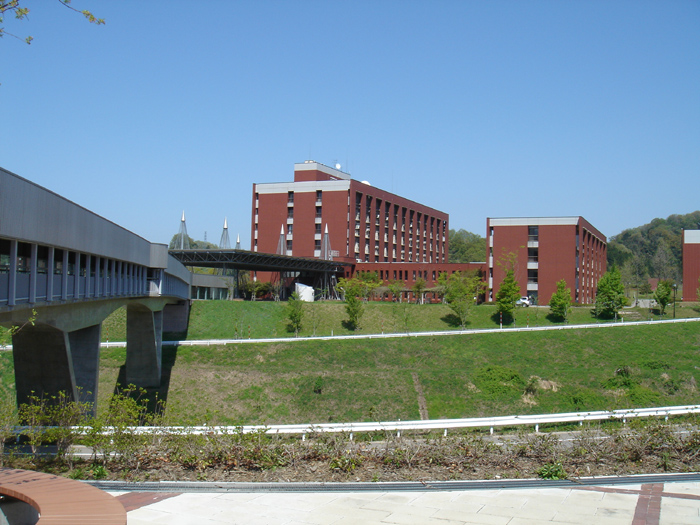

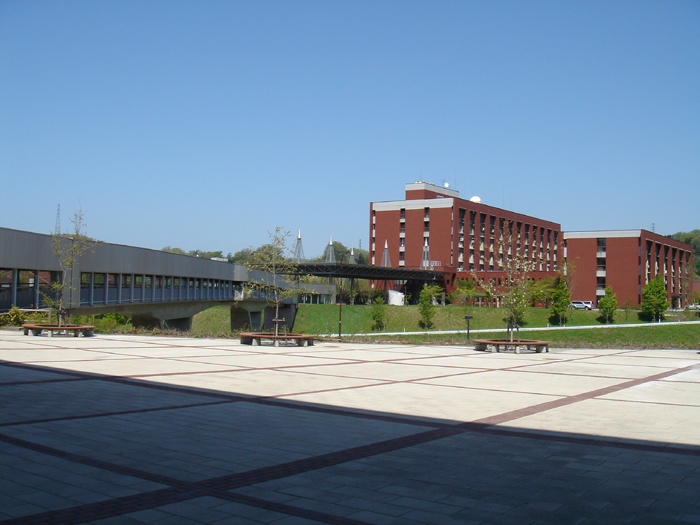
