= Nagoya Tech Silverbacks football =

2016 Nagoya Tech Silverbacks football team
- Location: Nagoya, Aichi
- Conference: Tokai Collegiate American Football Association
- Colors: Red, Gray, and Black
- Website: Nagoya Tech Silverbacks American Football Team

The Nagoya Tech Silverbacks football program represents the Nagoya Institute of Technology in college football. They are members of the Tokai Collegiate American Football Association.
