= Helmet sticker =

Decals on a football helmet

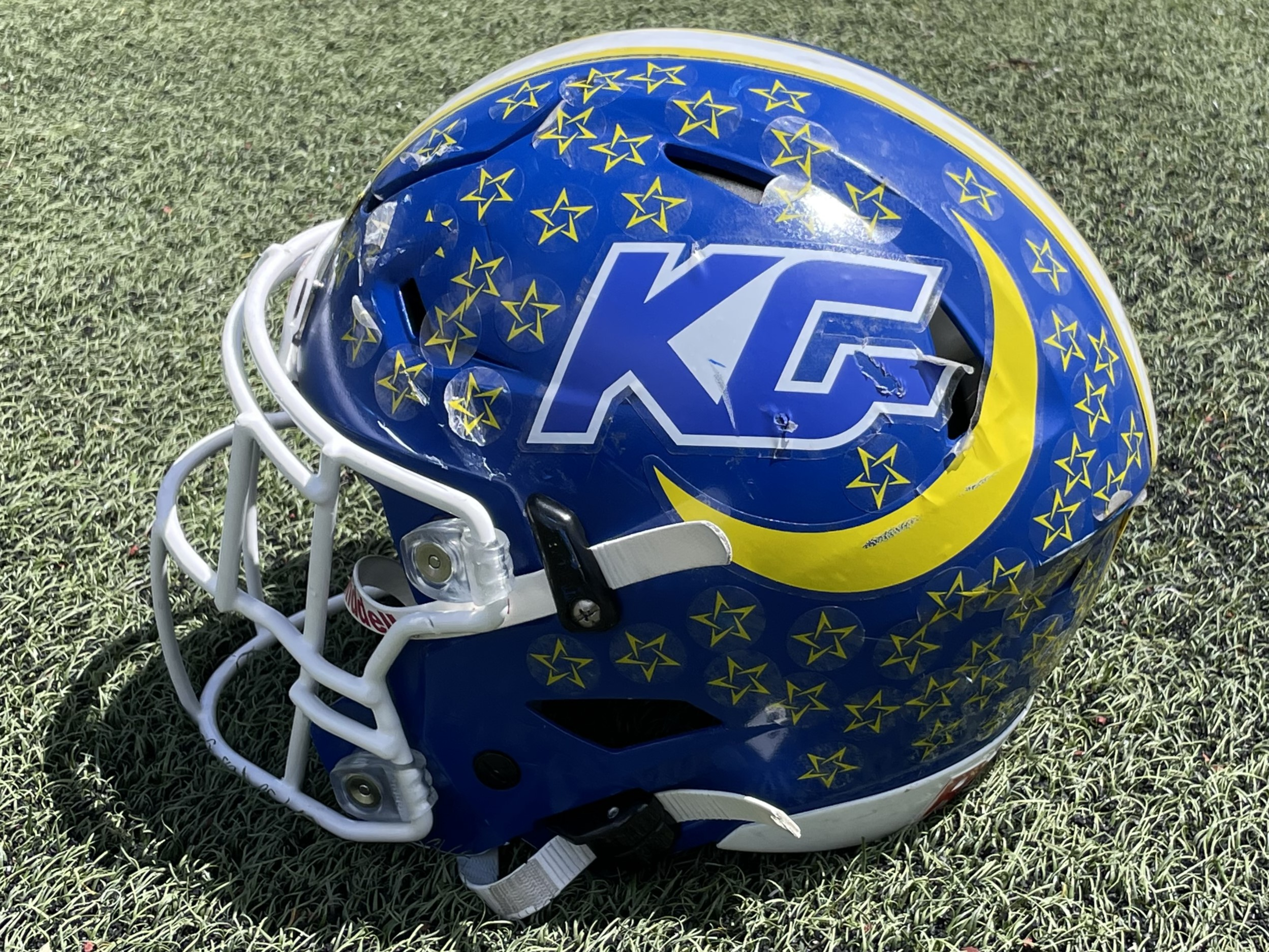
Helmet stickers on a helmet of Japan's KG Fighters

Helmet stickers, sometimes known as reward decals and pride stickers, are stickers that are affixed to an American football player's helmet. They can denote either individual or team accomplishments and are most commonly used in high school and college football rather than professional players.

== History ==
ESPN says the practice of awarding helmet stickers is often wrongly credited to Ernie Biggs, also an athletic trainer at Ohio State under legendary coach Woody Hayes. They instead claim that the practice of awarding stickers began with Jim Young, former assistant coach at Miami in 1965, two years before they were used by the Buckeyes.

An even earlier attribution is given to Gene Stauber, freshman coach at Nebraska (1955–1957) by head coach Pete Elliott. Stauber routinely used stickers throughout his tenure as assistant coach at Illinois (1960–1970), as a 1962 photo of All-American linebacker Dick Butkus indicates. The stickers stem from fighter pilots marking their planes with stickers or painted roundels after kills and/or successful missions.

Michael Pellowski, in his book Rutgers Football: A Gridiron Tradition in Scarlet, credits Rutgers defensive backs coach Dewey King with being “one of the first” to award decals for helmets in 1961. The stickers were given for interceptions only, so they were more difficult to earn. Every time there was an interception, the crowd yelled “give him the star.” The stars can be seen in a photo of the 1961 team walking from the locker room to the field prior to the season finale against Columbia.

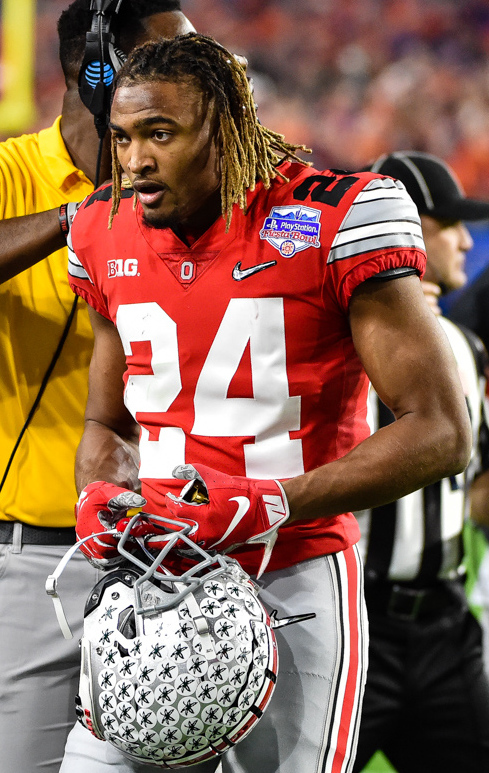
Shaun Wade of Ohio State carrying a helmet nearly covered with stickers

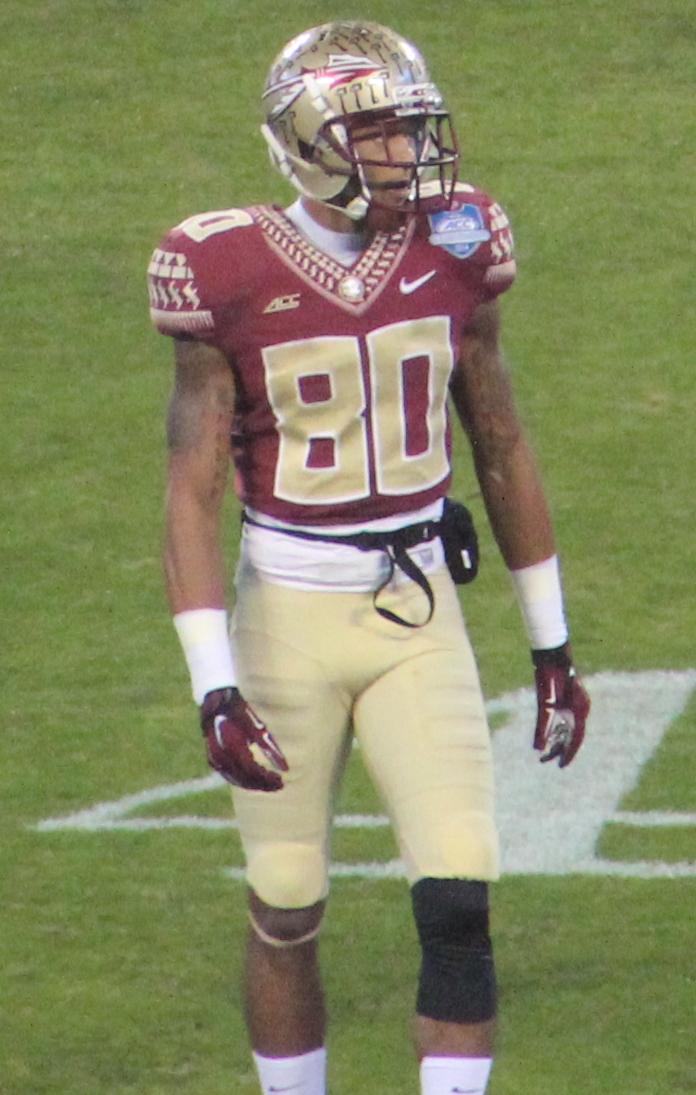
Rashad Greene of Florida State wearing a helmet with numerous stickers
