= Ryukoku Seahorse football =

2026 Ryukoku Seahorse football team
- First season: 1975; 51 years ago
- Location: Kyoto, Japan
- Conference: Kansai Collegiate American Football League
- Division: Division 1
- Colors: Purple and Black
- Website: Ryukoku Seahorse

The Ryukoku Seahorse football program represents Ryukoku University in college football. Ryukoku is a member of the Kansai Collegiate American Football League.
