= Masafumi Kawaguchi =

Japanese gridiron football player (born 1973)

No. 52
- Position: Linebacker

Personal information
- Born: February 19, 1973 (age 53); Kawanishi, Hyōgo, Japan

Career information
- High school: San Clemente (San Clemente, California)
- College: Ritsumeikan
- NFL draft: 1997: undrafted

Career history
- Amsterdam Admirals (1997–2003); Green Bay Packers (1998)*; San Francisco 49ers (2003)*
- * Offseason or practice squad member only

Masafumi Kawaguchi
Medal record

Men's American football

Representing Japan

World Championship
Gold medal – first place	1999 Italy	Team competition

Masafumi Kawaguchi (born February 19, 1973) is a Japanese former professional American football linebacker. He was born in Kawanishi, Hyogo and introduced to football during his senior year at San Clemente High School in California, when he moved there at the age of 17. He enrolled at Ritsumeikan University in Kyoto as an international relations major. He played for seven years with the Amsterdam Admirals of NFL Europe from 1997 to 2004. He was named to the All-NFL Europe Team in 1999.

In 1998, he was among the first four Japanese players to participate in a National Football League training camp when he participated in the Green Bay Packers camp and played in the 1998 American Bowl in Tokyo. In 2003, he was invited to the San Francisco 49ers training camp in 2003, and participated in the American Bowl exhibition game in the Osaka game between the 49ers and the Washington Redskins. He signed with the 49ers in 2003 but was released before the start of the season.

Kawaguchi played a key role on the Japanese national team that won the International Federation of American Football 1999 World Cup.
