= Ryoji Nakagawa =

Japanese judge

Ryoji Nakagawa (中川 了滋, Nakagawa Ryōji; born December 23, 1939) is a member of the Supreme Court of Japan.
