= Muromachi, Tokyo =

District in Chūō, Tokyo, Japan

Coordinates: 35°41′12″N 139°46′21″E

Muromachi 室町
- Neighborhood in Chūō
- Interactive map of Muromachi
- Country: Japan
- Prefecture: Tokyo
- Special ward: Chūō

Population (1 October 2020)
  - Total: 299
- Time zone: UTC+09:00
- ZIP code: 103-0022
- Telephone area code: 03

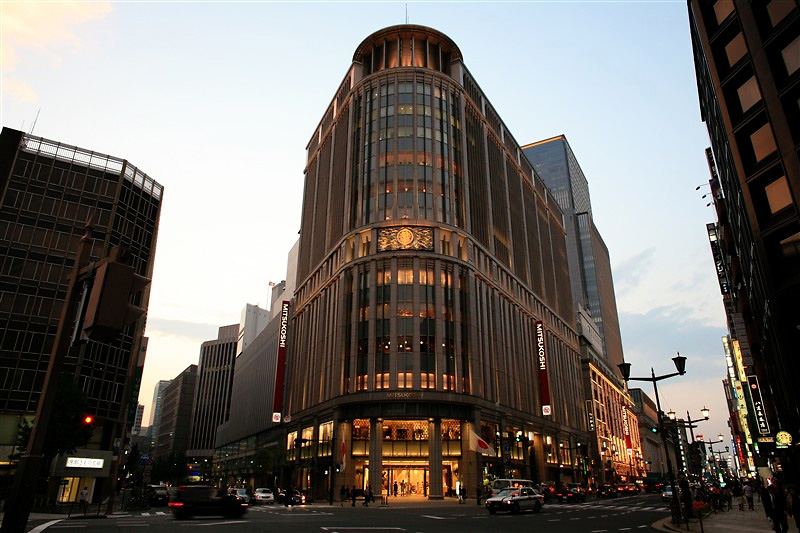
The Mitsukoshi Department Store

Muromachi (室町), or officially Nihonbashi-Muromachi (日本橋室町), is a district of Chūō, Tokyo, Japan. It formerly belonged to the Nihonbashi Ward (日本橋区), which corresponds to the present-day Nihonbashi area.

Muromachi is a business district, home to a number of long-established companies.

== Geography ==
Located on the western part of Chūō, Nihonbashi-Muromachi borders Kajichō, Chiyoda.

=== Rivers and Bridges ===
- Nihonbashi River
  - Nihonbashi Bridge
  - Edobashi Bridge

== Companies ==
- Mitsui Fudosan

== Places ==
- Sembikiya
- Nihonbashi Mitsui Tower
- Mitsukoshi Department Store Nihonbashi Main Branch

== Education ==
Public elementary and junior high schools are operated by Chuo City Board of Education.

Muromachi is zoned to Tokiwa Elementary School (常盤小学校) and Nihonbashi Junior High School (日本橋中学校).
