= 2015 Ritsumeikan Panthers football team =

College football season

2015 Ritsumeikan Panthers football

Kansai League Champions

West Japan Champions, College National Champions

L 22–19 Rice Bowl vs Panasonic Impulse
- Conference: Kansai Collegiate American Football League
- 1
- Record: 10–1 (3–0 Kansai)
- Head coach: Akira Yonekura
- Co-defensive coordinator: Yuji Ikegami
- Home stadium: Nishikyogoku Athletic Stadium

2015 Kansai Collegiate American Football League Division 1 football standings
	Conf.			Overall
Team	W		L	W		L
Ritsumeikan $	7	–	1	10	–	1
Kwansei Gakuin	7	–	1	9	–	1
Kansai	6	–	3	6	–	3
Kyoto	4	–	4	4	–	5
Kobe	5	–	4	8	–	4
Ryukoku	3	–	6	3	–	6
Kinki	2	–	6	2	–	7
Momoyama Gakuin	0	–	9	0	–	10
$ – Conference champion; As of December 14, 2015

The 2015 Ritsumeikan Panthers football team represented Ritsumeikan University in the Kansai Collegiate American Football League during the 2015 season. Ritsumeikan played their home games at Nishikyogoku Athletic Stadium in Kyoto, Japan.

== Season ==
=== Schedule ===
==== Preseason ====
Date	Time	Opponent	Site	Result
April 29	2:30 pm	Meijo*	Nagahama Dome; Shiga Prefecture	W 21-7
May 10	5:00 pm	Kansai	Expo Flash Field; Suita	L 7-24
*Non-conference game; All times are in [[Japan Standard Time Time Zone|Japan Standard Time time]]

==== Regular season ====
Date	Time	Opponent	Site	TV	Result
August 28	6:40 pm	Kyoto	Nishikyogoku Athletic Stadium; Kyoto	Ustream	W 44-0
September 12	6:30 pm	at Momoyama Gakuin	Expo Flash Field; Suita	Ustream	W 64-7
September 26	2:20 pm	at Kobe	Prince Stadium; Kobe	Ustream	W 48-0
October 11	5:00 pm	at Ryukoku	Expo Flash Field; Suita	Ustream	W 35-3
October 24	3:00 pm	Kansai	Nishikyogoku Athletics Stadium; Kyoto	Ustream	W 31-3
November 7	12:00 pm	at Kinki	Nagai Stadium; Osaka	Ustream	W 41-7
November 22	1:00 pm	Kwansei Gakuin	Nagai Stadium; Osaka	Ustream	W 30-27
All times are in [[Japan Standard Time Time Zone|Japan Standard Time time]]

Schedule sources:

==== Postseason ====
Date	Time	Opponent	Site	TV	Result
November 29	2:00 pm	at Seinan Gakuin*	Prince Stadium; Kobe (West Japan Championship)	Ustream	W 48-17
December 13	1:05 pm	at Waseda*	Koshien Stadium; Nishinomiya (Koshien Bowl)	Ustream	W 28-27
January 3		at Panasonic Impulse*	Tokyo Dome; Tokyo (Rice Bowl)		L 22-19
*Non-conference game; All times are in [[Japan Standard Time Time Zone|Japan Standard Time time]]

== Game summaries ==
=== Regular season ===
==== Kyoto ====
Ritsumeikan Panthers at Kyoto Gangsters – Game summary

Quarter	1	2	3	4	Total
Ritsumeikan	14	7	16	7	44
Kyoto	0	0	0	0	0

at Nishikyogoku Athletic Stadium • Kyoto

- Date: August 28, 2015
- Game time: 6:40 p.m.
- TV: Ustream

==== Momoyama Gakuin ====
Ritsumeikan at Momoyama Gakuin

Team	1	2	3	4	Total
• Ritsumeikan	14	15	21	14	64
Momoyama Gakuin	0	0	7	0	7

- Date: September 12th
- Game start: 6:30 PM
- Television network: Ustream

==== Kinki ====
Ritsumeikan at Kinki

Team	1	2	3	4	Total
• Ritsumeikan	14	21	0	6	41
Kinki	0	0	0	7	7

- Date: November 7th
- Game start: 12:00 PM
- Television network: Ustream

=== Postseason ===
==== Seinan Gakuin (West Japan Championship) ====
Seinan Gakuin at Ritsumeikan

Team	1	2	3	4	Total
Seinan Gakuin	0	3	7	7	17
• Ritsumeikan	7	14	7	20	48

- Date: November, 29th
- Location:
  Osaka
- Game start: 2:00PM
- Television network: Ustream
