= Tokai Collegiate American Football Association =

Tokai American Football Association
- Founded: 1975
- Region: Tōkai, Japan
- Official website: www.tkcafa.jp

The Tokai American Football Association (東海学生アメリカンフットボール連盟) (sometimes stylized as the "ToKai") is an American college football league made up of colleges and universities in the Tōkai region of Japan.

== Overview ==
The League was founded in 1975.

== Member schools ==
=== Block 1 ===
Institution	日本語	Location	Founded	Type	Enrollment	Nickname	Colors
Meijo University	名城大学	Tempaku-ku, Nagoya, Aichi	1926	Private		Golden Lions	
Nagoya University	名古屋大学	Chikusa-ku, Nagoya, Aichi	1871	Public	9,818	Grampus	
Chukyo University	中京大学	Shōwa-ku, Nagoya, Aichi	1954	Private		Eagles	
Nanzan University	南山大学	Nagoya, Aichi	1949	Private	9,292	Crusaders	
Aichi Gakuin University	愛知学院大学	Nisshin/Chikusa-ku, Nagoya/Kita-ku, Nagoya, Aichi	1876/1953	Private	11,607	Bisons	
Aichi University	愛知大学	Toyohashi/Nagoya, Aichi	1901	Private	9,612	Hercules	

=== Block 2 ===
Institution	日本語	Location	Founded	Type	Enrollment	Nickname	Colors
Mie University	三重大学	Tsu, Mie	1949	National	7505	Seaserpents	
Shinshu University	信州大学	Matsumoto, Nagano	1873	National	10,970	Wildcats	
Nagoya University of Commerce & Business	名古屋商科大学	Nagoya, Aichi	1953	Private	3,057	Wild Fox	
Nagoya Gakuin University	名古屋学院大学	Nagoya, Aichi	1964	Private	4743	Torpedoes	
Nagoya Institute of Technology	名古屋工業大学	Nagoya, Aichi	1949	National	5676	Silverbacks	Red, Grey, and Black
Yokkaichi University	四日市大学	Yokkaichi, Mie	1946	Private		Wild Drunkers	
Gifu University	岐阜大学	Gifu, Gifu	1949	National	7590	Phantoms	
Nihon Fukushi University	日本福祉大学	Mihama/Handa/Tokai/Nagoya, Aichi	1953	Private		Wings	
Shizuoka University	静岡大学	Shizuoka/Hamamatsu, Shizuoka	1949	National		Cavaliers	
Tokai University (Marine Science Department)	東海大学海洋学部	Tokyo	1942	Private	29,008	Poseidons	

== League champions ==
Season	Team	Record	Post-season Results
2015	Meijo	5-0	
2016	Meijo	5-0	
2017	Nagoya	5-0	
