= Ritsumeikan Panthers football =

- First season: 1953
- Head coach: Akira Yonekura
- Location: Kyoto, Japan
- Conference: Kansai Collegiate American Football League
- Division: Division 1
- Colors: Maroon and White

National championships
- Claimed: 3
- Website: RitsumeikanPanthers.com

The Ritsumeikan Panthers football program, established in 1953, represents Ritsumeikan University in college football. Ritsumeikan is a member of the Kansai Collegiate American Football League.

== Notable players ==
- Masafumi Kawaguchi
- Noriaki Kinoshita
