= Kansai Collegiate American Football League =

American college football league in Japan

- Founded: 1941
- Sports fielded: 1 (American football)
- No. of teams: 53
- Region: Kansai, Japan
- Website: www.kansai-football.jp

The Kansai Collegiate American Football League (関西学生アメリカンフットボール連盟) is an American college football league made up of fifty-three colleges and universities in the Kansai region of Japan.

== Overview ==
The Kansai League is a major college football league in West Japan. The league is divided into three divisions.

The winner of the league receives an automatic bid to the college football playoffs.

== Member schools ==
=== Division 1 ===
Division 1 is the highest level in the Kansai league. The winner from Division 1 goes on to play for the West Japan title.

==== Block A ====
Institution	日本語	Location	Founded	Type	Enrollment	Nickname	Colors
Ritsumeikan University	立命館大学	Kyoto, Kyoto	1900	Private	35,855	Panthers	Maroon and White
Kobe University	神戸大学	Kobe, Japan	1949	National	16,080	Ravens	Red and Black
Kindai University	近畿大学	Higashiosaka, Osaka	1925	Private	34,497	Big Blue, Devils	Navy & White
Momoyama Gakuin University	桃山学院大学	Izumi, Osaka	1884	Private	~7,000	Thundering; Legion Lions	Royal blue & White

==== B Block ====
Institution	日本語	Location	Founded	Type	Enrollment	Nickname	Colors
Kwansei Gakuin University	関西学院大学	Nishinomiya, Hyōgo	1889	Private	25,505	Fighters	Blue, White & Yellow
Kansai University	関西大学	Suita, Osaka	1886	Private	29,593	Kaisers	Blue & Gold
Kyoto University	京都大学	Kyoto, Kyoto	1897	Public	22,615	Gangsters	Green and White
Doshisha University	同志社大学	Kyoto, Kyoto	1875	Private	28,016	Wild Rover	White and Purple

=== Division 2 ===
==== A Block ====
Institution	日本語	Location	Founded	Type	Enrollment	Nickname	Colors
Ryukoku University	龍谷大学	Kyoto, Kyoto	1639	Private	20,377	Seahorse	Purple & Black
Kobe Gakuin University	神戸学院大学	Kobe, Hyogo	1966	Private	2,702	Navy Seals	Navy & Gold
Osaka Kyoiku University	大阪教育大学	Kashiwara, Osaka	1949	National	4,359	Dragons	Maroon & White
University of Hyogo	兵庫県立大学	Chuo-ku, Kobe	2004	Public	6,542	Trail Blazers	Navy & White

==== B Block ====
Institution	日本語	Location	Founded	Type	Enrollment	Nickname	Colors
Konan University	甲南大学	Higashinada-ku, Kobe	1951	Private	8,889	Red Gang	Red & White
Kyoto Sangyo University	京都産業大学	Kita-ku, Kyoto	1965	Private	14,511	Sagittarius	Blue & White
Osaka University	大阪大学	Suita, Osaka	1724	Public	23,226	Tridents	Blue
Osaka Prefecture University	大阪府立大学	Sakai, Osaka	1883	Public	7,705	Shrikes	Blue & White

=== Division 3 ===
==== A Block ====
Institution	日本語	Location	Founded	Type	Enrollment	Nickname	Colors
Osaka Sangyo University	大阪産業大学	Daito, Osaka	1923	Private	10,238	Lions	
University of Tokushima	徳島大学	Tokushima, Tokushima	1949	National		Pirates	
Tottori University	国立大学法人鳥取大学	Tottori, Tottori	1949	National	6,354	Rakers	

==== B Block ====
Institution	日本語	Location	Founded	Type	Enrollment	Nickname	Colors
Kyoto Tech	京都工芸繊維大学	Kyoto, Kyoto	1949	National		Cougars	
Okayama University	岡山大学	Okayama, Okayama	1870	National	14,035	Badgers	
Otemon Gakuin University	追手門学院大学	Ibaraki, Osaka	1888	Private		Soldiers	

==== C Block ====
Institution	日本語	Location	Founded	Type	Enrollment	Nickname	Colors
Osaka University of Health and Sport Sciences	大阪体育大学	Kumatori, Osaka	1965	Private		Spartans	
Hannan University	阪南大学	Matsubara, Osaka	1965	Private	5,116	Fighting Bears	
Wakayama University	和歌山大学	Wakayama, Wakayama	1949	National	4,090	Blind Sharks	

==== D Block ====
Institution	日本語	Location	Founded	Type	Enrollment	Nickname	Colors
Shiga University	滋賀大学	Ōtsu, Shiga	1949	National	4,114	Gladiators	
Osaka City University	大阪市立大学	Sumiyoshi-ku, Osaka	1880	Public	8,616	Golden Cedars	
Osaka University of Economics	大阪経済大学	Higashiyodogawa-ku, Osaka	1932	Private	7,549	Bombers	

=== Division 4 ===
==== Block A ====
Institution	日本語	Location	Founded	Type	Enrollment	Nickname	Colors
Kansai Gaidai	関西外国語大学	Hirakata, Osaka	1945	Private	14,000	Lynx	
Bukkyo University	佛教大学	Kita-ku, Kyoto	1912	Private		Hawks	
University of Marketing and Distribution Sciences	流通科学大学	Kobe, Hyōgo	1988	Private		Voyagers	

==== Block B ====
Institution	日本語	Location	Founded	Type	Enrollment	Nickname	Colors
Setsunan University	摂南大学	Neyagawa, Osaka	1922	Private		Blue Crush	
Osaka Electro-Communication University	大阪電気通信大学	Neyagawa, Osaka	1924	Private		Black Angels	
Osaka Gakuin University	大阪学院大学	Suita, Osaka	1963	Private		Phoenix	

==== Open ====
Institution	日本語	Location	Founded	Type	Enrollment	Nickname	Colors
Kyoto Pharmaceutical University	京都薬科大学	Kyoto, Kyoto	1884	Private		Scarlet Knights	

=== Six Player ===
==== Block A ====
Institution	日本語	Location	Founded	Type	Enrollment	Nickname	Colors
Tenri University	天理大学	Tenri, Nara	1925	Private (Tenrikyo)		Crushing Orcs	
Osaka University of Economics and Law	大阪経済法科大学	Yao, Osaka	1971	Private		Blue Thunder	
Kyoto Prefectural University	京都府立大学	Sakyō-ku, Kyoto	1895	Public		Wyverns	

==== Block B ====
Institution	日本語	Location	Founded	Type	Enrollment	Nickname	Colors
Otani University	大谷大学	Kita-ku, Kyoto	1901	Private (Buddhist)		Bandits	
Osaka Tech	大阪工業大学	Asahi-ku, Osaka	1922	Private		Rowdies	
Kyoto Gakuen University	京都学園大学	Kameoka, Kyoto	1925	Private		Dare Devils	

==== Open ====
Institution	日本語	Location	Founded	Type	Enrollment	Nickname	Colors
Kyoto University of Education	京都教育大学	Kyoto, Kyoto	1949	National		Grampus	
Tezukayama University	帝塚山大学	Nara, Nara	1941	Private	4,609	Bisons	

== Year-by-Year Standings ==
=== Division 1 ===
Year	1	2	3	4	5	6	7	8
1941	Kansai	Kwansei Gakuin	Doshisha	Kansai OB				
1942	Kansai	Doshisha	Kwansei Gakuin					
1943	DID NOT PLAY							
1944	DID NOT PLAY							
1945	DID NOT PLAY							
1946	Doshisha	Kwansei Gakuin	Kansai					
1947	Kansai	Doshisha	Kwansei Gakuin	Kyoto				
1948	Kansai; Kwansei Gakuin		Doshisha	Kyoto				
1949	Kwansei Gakuin	Kyoto	Kansai	Doshisha				
1950	Kwansei Gakuin	Kansai	Doshisha	Kyoto				
1951	Kwansei Gakuin	Kansai	Doshisha	Kyoto				
1952	Kwansei Gakuin	Doshisha	Kansai	Kyoto				
1953	Kwansei Gakuin	Kansai	Doshisha	Ritsumeikan				
1954	Kwansei Gakuin	Doshisha	Kansai	Kyoto	Ritsumeikan			
1955	Kwansei Gakuin	Kansai	Doshisha	Ritsumeikan	Kyoto			
1956	Kwansei Gakuin	Kansai	Doshisha	Kyoto	Ritsumeikan	Konan		
1957	Kwansei Gakuin	Doshisha	Kansai	Konan	Ritsumeikan			
1958	Kwansei Gakuin	Doshisha	Konan	Kansai	Ritsumeikan	Kyoto		
1959	Kwansei Gakuin	Kansai	Konan	Doshisha	Kyoto	Ritsumeikan		
1960	Kwansei Gakuin	Konan	Doshisha	Kansai	Kyoto	Ritsumeikan		
1961	Kwansei Gakuin	Konan	Doshisha	Kansai	Kyoto	Ritsumeikan		
1962	Kwansei Gakuin	Konan	Kansai	Kyoto	Doshisha	Ritsumeikan		
1963	Kwansei Gakuin	Konan	Doshisha	Kyoto	Kansai	Ritsumeikan		
1964	Kwansei Gakuin	Kansai	Konan	Kyoto	Doshisha	Ritsumeikan		
1965	Kwansei Gakuin	Kansai	Konan	Kyoto	Doshisha	Ritsumeikan		
1966	Kwansei Gakuin	Kansai	Kyoto	Konan	Ritsumeikan	Doshisha		
1967	Kwansei Gakuin	Kansai	Kyoto	Doshisha	Ritsumeikan	Konan	Kinki	
1968	Kwansei Gakuin	Doshisha	Kansai	Kyoto	Ritsumeikan	Konan	Kinki	
1969	Kwansei Gakuin	Doshisha	Kansai	Kyoto	Konan	Kinki	Ritsumeikan	
1970	Kwansei Gakuin	Kyoto	Kansai	Momoyama Gakuin	Kinki	Konan	Doshisha	Ritsumeikan
1971	Kwansei Gakuin	Konan	Kyoto	Kansai	Otemon Gakuin	Momoyama Gakuin	Kinki	Doshisha
1972	Kwansei Gakuin	Kyoto	Konan	Kansai	Kinki	Osaka	Momoyama Gakuin	Otemon Gakuin
1973	Kwansei Gakuin	Kyoto	Kansai	Osaka	Momoyama Gakuin	Konan	Kinki	Otemon Gakuin
1974	Kwansei Gakuin	Kyoto	Kinki	Konan	Osaka	Momoyama Gakuin	Kansai	Otemon Gakuin
1975	Kwansei Gakuin	Kyoto	Kansai	Kinki	Konan	Momoyama Gakuin	Otemon Gakuin	Osaka
1976	Kwansei Gakuin	Kyoto	Kansai	Kinki	Otemon Gakuin	Konan	Momoyama Gakuin	Osaka
1977	Kwansei Gakuin	Kyoto	Doshisha	Kinki	Kansai	Momoyama Gakuin	Konan	Otemon Gakuin
1978	Kwansei Gakuin	Kyoto	Kinki	Kansai	Doshisha	Osaka University of Economics	Konan	Momoyama Gakuin
1979	Kwansei Gakuin; Doshisha		Kansai	Kyoto	Kinki	Osaka University of Health and Sport Sciences	Osaka University of Economics	Kobe Gakuin
1980	Kwansei Gakuin; Kinki		Kyoto	Doshisha	Osaka University of Health and Sport Sciences	Kansai	Ritsumeikan	Kobe
1981	Kwansei Gakuin	Kyoto	Osaka University of Health and Sport Sciences	Kinki	Kobe	Doshisha	Kansai	Ritsumeikan
1982	Kyoto	Kwansei Gakuin	Kinki	Osaka University of Health and Sport Sciences	Kobe	Doshisha	Okayama	Kansai
1983	Kyoto	Kwansei Gakuin	Osaka University of Health and Sport Sciences	Doshisha	Kinki	Osaka City	Kobe	Ritsumeikan
1984	Kwansei Gakuin; Kinki		Osaka University of Health and Sport Sciences	Kyoto	Kobe	Ritsumeikan	Doshisha	Osaka City
1985	Kwansei Gakuin	Kyoto	Ritsumeikan	Osaka University of Health and Sport Sciences	Kinki	Kobe	Chukyo	Doshisha
1986	Kyoto	Kwansei Gakuin	Kinki	Osaka University of Health and Sport Sciences	Doshisha	Ritsumeikan	Kobe	Osaka
1987	Kyoto	Kwansei Gakuin	Kinki	Doshisha	Ritsumeikan	Konan	Osaka University of Health and Sport Sciences	Kansai
1988	Kwansei Gakuin	Kyoto	Ritsumeikan	Doshisha	Kinki	Kobe	Osaka University of Health and Sport Sciences	Konan
1989	Kwansei Gakuin	Kinki	Ritsumeikan	Doshisha	Kyoto	Kobe	Kyoto Sangyo	Konan
1990	Kyoto	Ritsumeikan	Kobe	Doshisha	Kinki	Kwansei Gakuin	Kansai	Kyoto Sangyo
1991	Kwansei Gakuin; Kyoto		Ritsumeikan	Doshisha	Kobe	Osaka University of Health and Sport Sciences	Kansai	Kinki
1992	Kyoto	Kwansei Gakuin	Kobe	Ritsumeikan	Doshisha	Kansai	Osaka University of Health and Sport Sciences	Kyoto Sangyo
1993	Kwansei Gakuin	Kyoto	Ritsumeikan	Kobe	Kinki	Osaka University of Health and Sport Sciences	Kansai	Doshisha
1994	Ritsumeikan	Kyoto	Kwansei Gakuin	Kinki	Konan	Kyoto Sangyo	Kobe	Osaka University of Health and Sport Sciences
1995	Kyoto	Ritsumeikan	Kwansei Gakuin	Konan	Kinki	Kansai	Doshisha	Kyoto Sangyo
1996	Kyoto; Ritsumeikan; Kwansei Gakuin			Kinki	Konan	Osaka Sangyo	Doshisha	Kansai
1997	Kwansei Gakuin	Ritsumeikan	Kyoto	Kinki	Kobe	Osaka Sangyo	Konan	Kansai
1998	Ritsumeikan	Kyoto	Kwansei Gakuin	Kinki	Kansai	Kobe	Osaka Sangyo	Doshisha
1999	Kwansei Gakuin	Ritsumeikan	Kyoto	Konan	Kobe	Kinki	Osaka Sangyo	Kansai
2000	Kwansei Gakuin	Kyoto	Ritsumeikan	Konan	Kobe	Doshisha	Kinki	Osaka Sangyo
2001	Kwansei Gakuin	Ritsumeikan	Kyoto	Kinki	Kobe	Konan	Doshisha	Osaka Sangyo
2002	Ritsumeikan	Kwansei Gakuin	Kinki	Kyoto	Kobe	Konan	Doshisha	Osaka Sangyo
2003	Ritsumeikan	Kyoto	Kinki	Kwansei Gakuin	Kansai	Doshisha	Kobe	Konan
2004	Ritsumeikan; Kwansei Gakuin		Kansai	Kyoto	Kobe	Ryukoku	Kinki	Doshisha
2005	Ritsumeikan	Kwansei Gakuin	Kansai	Doshisha	Kyoto	Kinki	Kobe	Ryukoku
2006	Kwansei Gakuin	Ritsumeikan	Kyoto	Kansai	Kobe	Doshisha	Kinki	Osaka Sangyo
2007	Kwansei Gakuin	Ritsumeikan	Kansai	Kyoto	Kinki	Kobe	Ryukoku	Doshisha
2008	Ritsumeikan	Kwansei Gakuin	Kobe	Kyoto	Kansai	Konan	Kinki	Doshisha
2009	Kansai	Kwansei Gakuin	Ritsumeikan	Doshisha	Konan	Kyoto	Kobe	Kinki
2010	Ritsumeikan; Kwansei Gakuin; Kansai			Kyoto	Kobe	Konan	Doshisha	Kinki
2011	Kwansei Gakuin	Ritsumeikan	Kansai	Kyoto	Ryukoku	Kobe	Doshisha	Konan
2012	Kwansei Gakuin	Ritsumeikan	Kansai	Kyoto	Kobe	Kinki	Ryukoku	Doshisha
2013	Kwansei Gakuin	Ritsumeikan	Kansai	Kyoto	Ryukoku	Kinki	Kobe	Osaka Kyoiku
2014	Kwansei Gakuin	Ritsumeikan	Kansai	Kinki	Kobe	Ryukoku	Kyoto	Doshisha
2015	Ritsumeikan	Kwansei Gakuin	Kansai	Kyoto	Kobe	Ryukoku	Kinki	Momoyama Gakuin

== Conference championships ==
=== Division 1 champions ===
Season	Champion
1946	Doshisha
1947	Kansai
1948	Kansai
1948	Kwansei Gakuin
1949	Kwansei Gakuin
1950	Kwansei Gakuin
1951	Kwansei Gakuin
1952	Kwansei Gakuin
1953	Kwansei Gakuin
1954	Kwansei Gakuin
1955	Kwansei Gakuin
1956	Kwansei Gakuin
1957	Kwansei Gakuin
1958	Kwansei Gakuin
1959	Kwansei Gakuin
1960	Kwansei Gakuin
1961	Kwansei Gakuin
1962	Kwansei Gakuin
1963	Kwansei Gakuin
1964	Kwansei Gakuin
1965	Kwansei Gakuin
1966	Kwansei Gakuin
1967	Kwansei Gakuin
1968	Kwansei Gakuin
1969	Kwansei Gakuin
1970	Kwansei Gakuin
1971	Kwansei Gakuin
1972	Kwansei Gakuin
1973	Kwansei Gakuin
1974	Kwansei Gakuin
1975	Kwansei Gakuin
1976	Kwansei Gakuin
1977	Kwansei Gakuin
1978	Kwansei Gakuin
1979	Kwansei Gakuin
1979	Doshisha
1980	Kwansei Gakuin
1980	Kinki
1981	Kwansei Gakuin
1982	Kyoto
1983	Kyoto
1984	Kwansei Gakuin
1984	Kinki
1985	Kinki
1986	Kyoto
1987	Kyoto
1988	Kwansei Gakuin
1989	Kwansei Gakuin
1990	Kyoto
1991	Kwansei Gakuin
1991	Kyoto
1992	Kyoto
1993	Kwansei Gakuin
1994	Ritsumeikan
1995	Kyoto
1996	Kwansei Gakuin
1996	Kyoto
1996	Ritsumeikan
1997	Kwansei Gakuin
1998	Ritsumeikan
1999	Kwansei Gakuin
2000	Kwansei Gakuin
2001	Kwansei Gakuin
2002	Ritsumeikan
2003	Ritsumeikan
2004	Kwansei Gakuin
2004	Ritsumeikan
2005	Ritsumeikan
2006	Kwansei Gakuin
2007	Kwansei Gakuin
2008	Ritsumeikan
2009	Kansai
2010	Kwansei Gakuin
2010	Kansai
2010	Ritsumeikan
2011	Kwansei Gakuin
2012	Kwansei Gakuin
2013	Kwansei Gakuin
2014	Kwansei Gakuin
2015	Ritsumeikan

== Relegation ==
At the end of every season, there are two relegation games. The two worst teams of Division 1 play the top two teams of Division 2. If the Division 1 team wins their game, they remain in Division 1. However, if they lose, they will be realigned to Division 2 and the team that beat them will be realigned to Division one for the following season.

=== 2013 ===
Date	Division 1		Division 2		Relegation
December 12, 2013	Kobe	42	Ōsaka Prefecture	0	No relegation
December 12, 2013	Ōsaka Kyoiku	9	Doshisha	24	Doshisha → Division 1 Ōsaka Kyoiku → Division 2

=== 2014 ===
Date	Division 1		Division 2		Outcome
December 7, 2014	Kyoto	52	Ōtemon Gakuin	0	No relegation
December 7, 2014	Doshisha	14	Momoyama Gakuin	31	Doshisha → Division 2 Momoyama → Division 1

=== 2015 ===
Date	Division 1		Division 2		Outcome
December 6, 2015	Kinki	17	Doshisha	21	Doshisha → Division 1 Kinki → Division 2
December 6, 2015	Momoyama Gakuin	3	Konan	9	Konan → Division 1 Momoyama Gakuin → Division 2
