= Kwansei Gakuin Fighters football =

College football team in Japan

Kwansei Gakuin Fighters
2026 Kwansei Gakuin Fighters football team
- First season: 1941
- Head coach: Kazuki Omura
- Location: Nishinomiya, Japan
- Conference: Kansai Collegiate American Football League
- Division: Division 1
- Colors: Blue and Yellow

National championships
- Claimed: 34

Conference championships
- 62
- Fight song: Fight On, Kwansei
- Outfitter: Under Armour
- Website: kgfighters.com

The Kwansei Gakuin Fighters football program, established in 1941, represents Kwansei Gakuin University in college football. Kwansei Gakuin is a member of the Kansai Collegiate American Football League.

KG Fighters
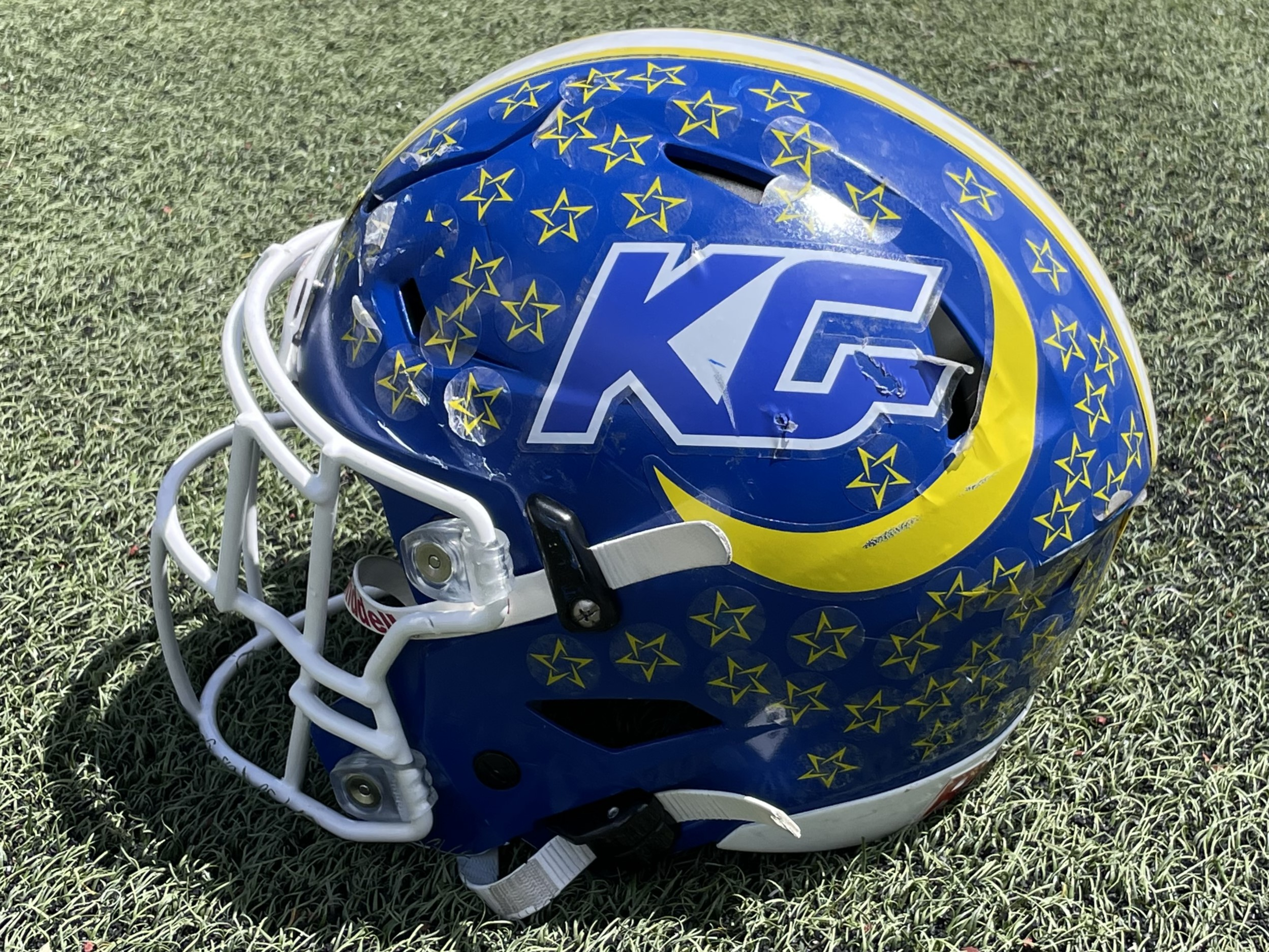
KG helmet with helmet stickers

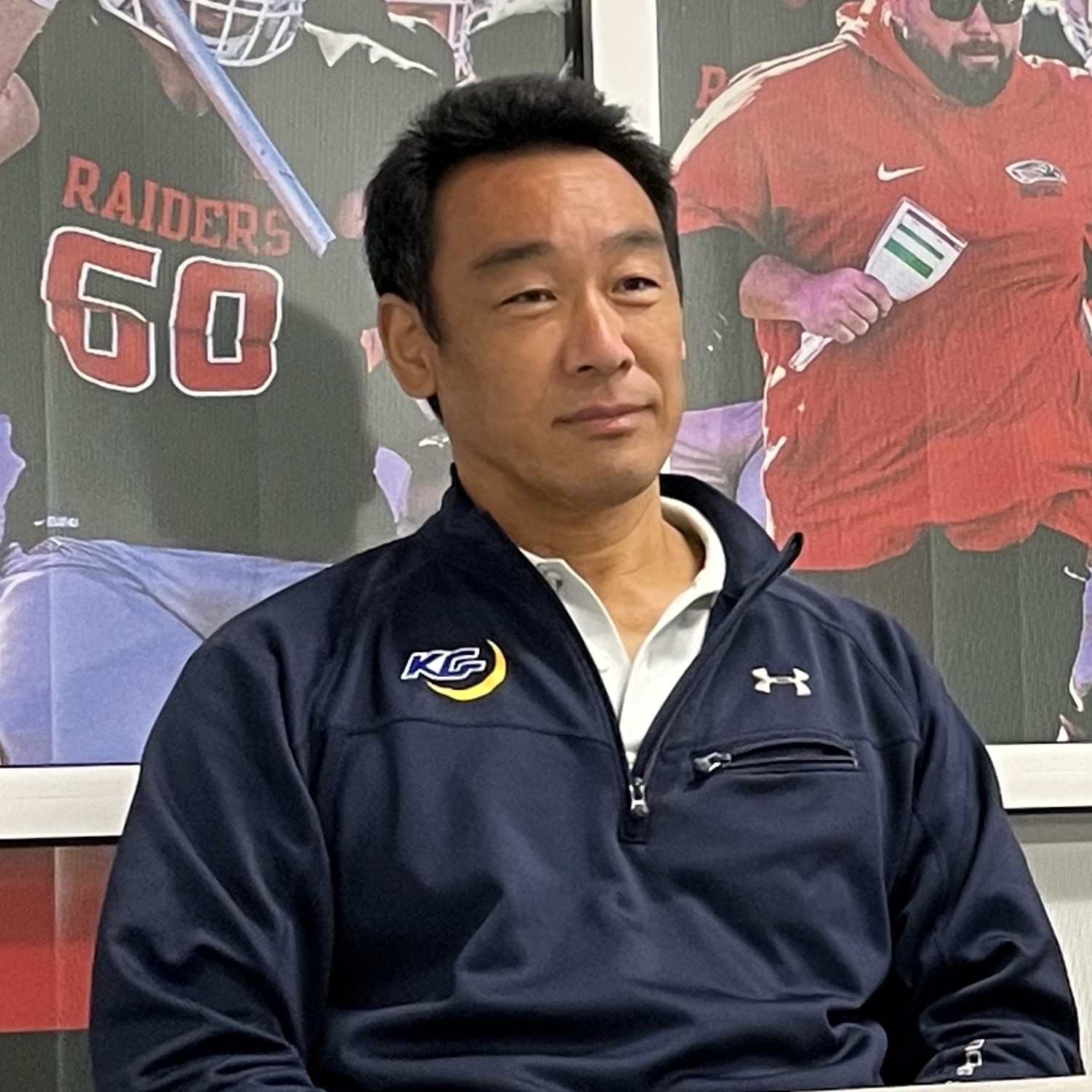
Kazuki "Kaz" Omura (大村 和輝), head coach (2020-present); 4 national championships

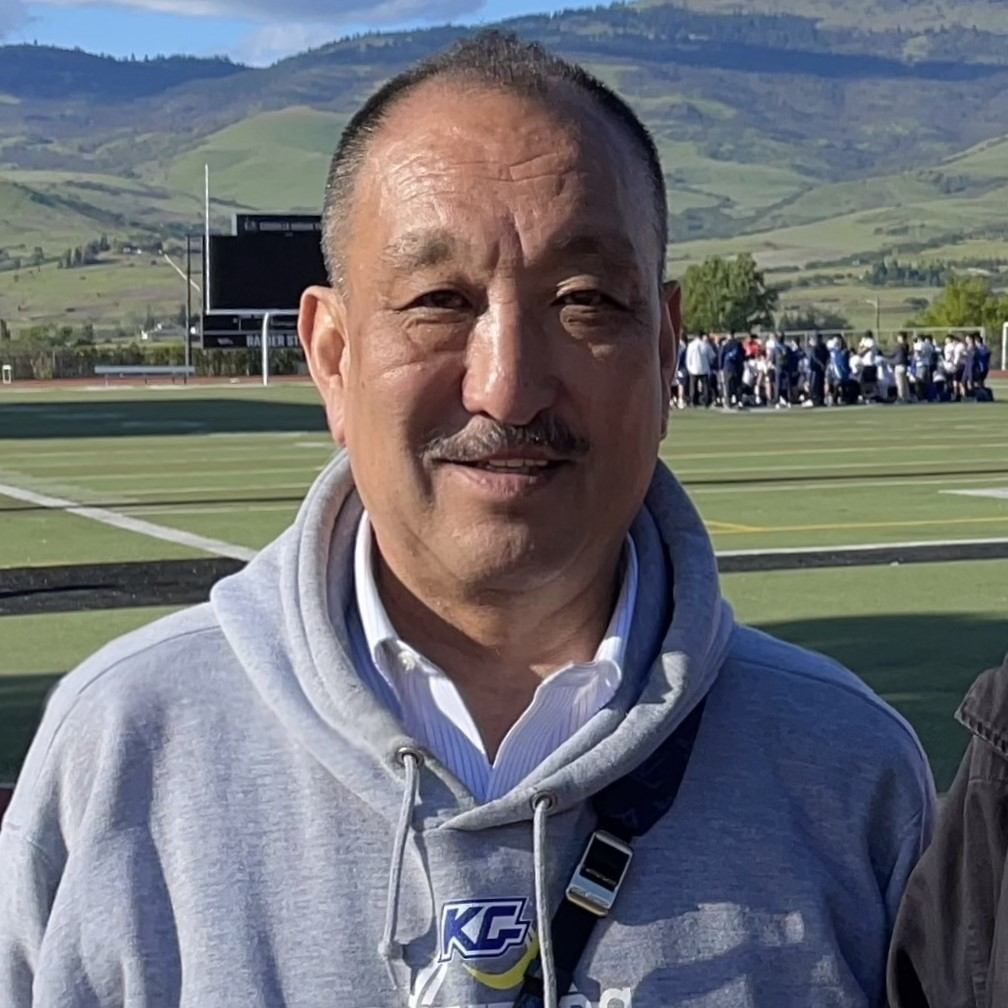
Hideaki "Hank" Toriuchi (鳥内 秀晃), head coach (1992-2019); 12 national championships
