= Asian American Arts Centre =

New York City arts organization

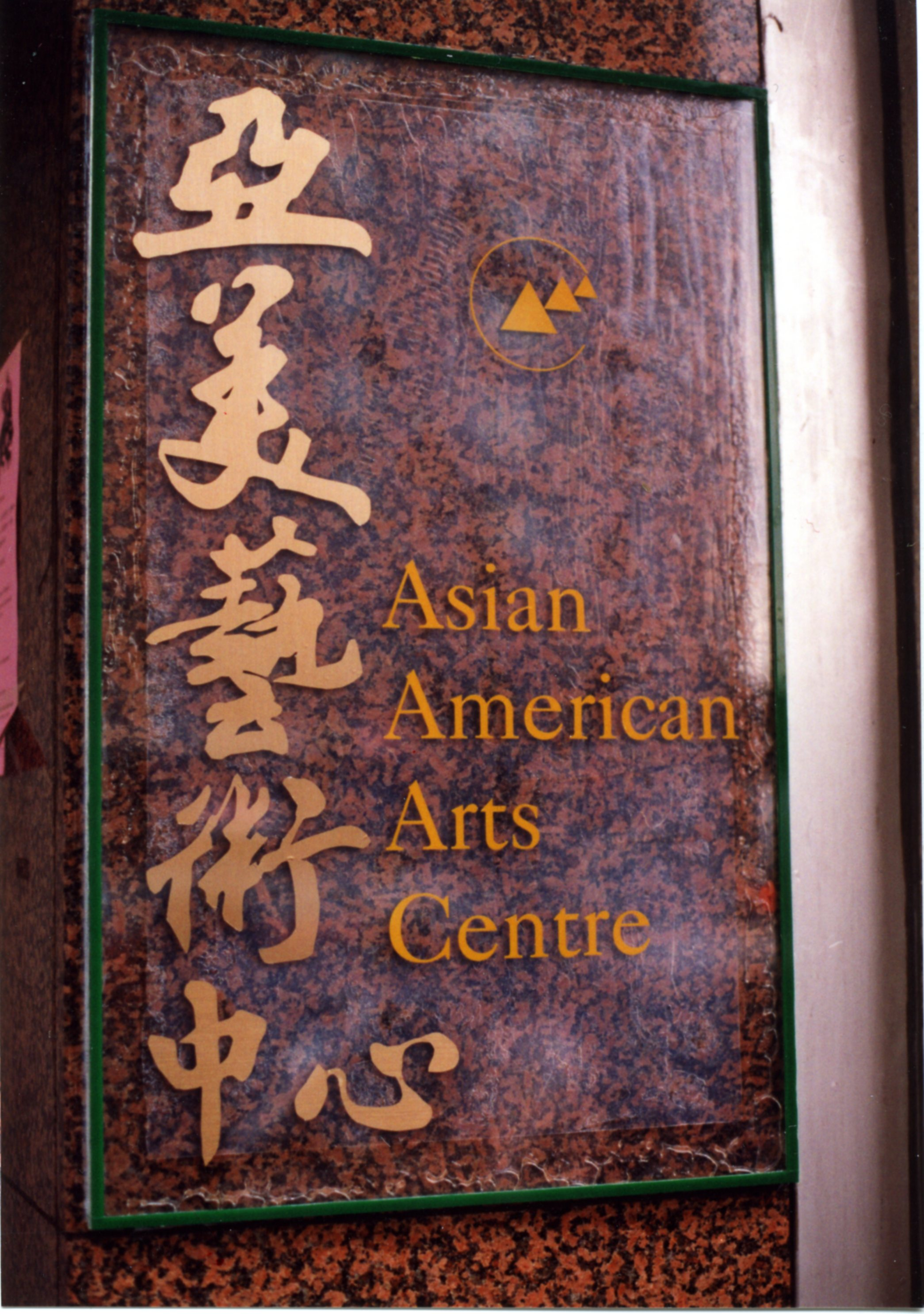
AAAC's front door sign at previous Bowery location

The Asian American Arts Centre (AAAC) is a non-profit organization located in the Chinatown neighborhood of Manhattan in New York City. Founded in 1974, it's one of the earliest Asian American community organizations in the United States. The Arts Centre presents the ongoing developments between contemporary Asian & Asian American art forms and Western art forms through the presentation of performance, exhibitions, and public education. AAAC's permanent collection, which it has accumulated since 1989, contains hundreds of contemporary Asian American art works and traditional/folk art pieces. The organization also has an Artists Archive which documents, preserves, and promotes the presence of Asian American visual culture in the United States since 1945. This includes the East Coast, especially the greater New York area; the West Coast; and some artists in Canada, Hawaii, and overseas. The artists include Asian Americans producing art, Asian artists who are active in the United States, and other Americans who are significantly influenced by Asia. Pan-Asian in outlook, the Arts Centre's understanding of 'Asia' encompasses traditions and influences with sources ranging from Afghanistan to Hawaii.

== Mission ==
The mission of the Asian American Arts Centre is to affirm and promote the preservation and creative vitality of Asian American cultural growth through the arts, and its historical and aesthetic linkage to other communities. AAAC accomplishes this by utilizing art, performances, new media, and public education. Aiming to engage other communities and concerns in a creative encounter, the Arts Centre brings cultural events in contemporary visual art to the general public. AAAC has come to see the arts in terms of their historical and spiritual relationship to diverse neighborhoods.

== History ==
The Asian American Arts Centre was founded in 1974 in New York as the Asian American Dance Theatre (AADT), a not-for-profit community arts organization. It is one of the older community arts organizations in Chinatown, Manhattan, beginning with the start of the Asian American movement and growing out of Basement Workshop with other Asian American cultural and political organizations in New York.

In 1974, the organization operated out of the New York Public Library to offer dance classes and dance presentations to the community. It obtained its original location on the third floor of 26 Bowery Street as an Artist-In-Residence (AIR) tenant in 1976; the education programs were expanded into a Saturday Community School on-site, which included dance and later art classes for children and adults. The organization started its Arts-in-Education program in 1978, conducting workshops and lectures in citywide public schools.

In 1982, the organization created the Asian American Artists' Slide Archive (the first public archive for Asian American artists in the United States), started an annual nine-month Artists-in-Residence program, and organized its first exhibition, Eye to Eye. This exhibition, which featured a panel with John Yau, David Diao, Margo Machida, Lucy Lippard, Lydia Okumura, Kit Yin Snyder, and John Woo, was the first of its kind to bring together Asian American visual artists on the East Coast.

=== Exhibitions and performances at Bowery location (1983–2010) ===
==== 1983 – 1993 ====
Brochure for AAAC's "Eye to Eye" event in 1983

The Eye to Eye exhibition initiated a series of visual art exhibitions as part of a new program within the AADT called the Asian Arts Institute, consisting of three to five contemporary visual art exhibitions and one folk art exhibition each year. Nina Kuo, visual artist was the first resident artist who garnered public funding for co-curating, documenting, researching slide registry, and giving panel talks in 1983. The Traditional Arts Presentation and Documentation program began in 1985. The organization adopted its current name, the Asian American Arts Centre (AAAC), in 1987 to encompass both the dance company (AADT) and the visual arts program.

In addition to regular exhibitions at the Bowery location in Chinatown, AAAC held many of its programs at other sites and locations in the country. In 1989, the Arts Centre organized its most ambitious exhibition, CHINA: June 4, 1989, in response to the Tiananmen Square student massacre. Accumulating contributions from over 300 artists over the next several months, CHINA: June 4, 1989 was exhibited at the Blum Helman Gallery and PS1 (now MoMA PS1) in 1990, and travelled to Austin, Texas, Cleveland, Ohio, and later to Flint, Michigan in 1994. In conjunction with the CHINA: June 4, 1989 visual art exhibition, the dance company mounted a program of performances in 1990 titled A Memorial Performance of Music, Poetry and Dance which featured Zuni Icosahedron's U.S. debut of "Deep Structure…" among other performances by contributing artists. A smaller selection of artworks from this exhibition, including art by Martin Wong, was exhibited in Hong Kong in 1990 for the first memorial of the protests. The Arts Centre was contracted to curate an exhibition in the U.S. Senate's Russell Rotunda in Washington, D.C. upon the escape of Chai Ling and Wang Dan, two former leaders of the student demonstrations, from China. However, upon the rejection of two proposed artworks by Byron Kim and Zhang Hongtu for the exhibition by Senate sponsors, AAAC refused to participate and withdrew the artworks it had planned to exhibit shortly before the show's debut.

The Asian American Dance Theatre continued to perform under the artistic direction of Eleanor Yung in New York and around the United States until 1992, and was structured around four areas of programming: (1) its annual New York Dance Season, (2) touring and special performances, (3) Arts-in-Education programs, and (4) the Community School. AADT held its own New York Season in contemporary dance every year from 1976 to 1990. The dance company's total repertoire, however, encompassed contemporary dance and traditional Asian folk/classical dance from countries such as China, Japan, Korea, India, the Philippines, Indonesia, Bali, and the Pacific Islands. For its touring performances, AADT's programs usually consisted of traditional dances and sometimes contemporary dances. AADT also organized special programs such as the D'Asia Vu Performance Series, which ran from the late 1980s to early 1990s. The Arts-in-Education programs and Community School were continued from earlier programming begun in the late 1970s.

During the 14-year run of AADT's New York Season, the dance company performed at various sites and events throughout New York including Riverside Dance Festival, Marymount Manhattan College Theater, Pace University Schimmel Center, Dance Theater Workshop, Open Eye Theater, Clark Center NYC, and Synod House. For its touring performances, AADT performed at colleges and sites in Texas, Ohio, New Mexico, North Carolina, Pennsylvania, and numerous other states throughout the country. AADT collaborated with notable choreographers Saeko Ichinohe, Sun Ock Lee, and Reynaldo Alejandro in the Asian New Dance Coalition; the company also invited guest choreographers, dancers, performers, and artists such as Yung Yung Tsuai, Muna Tseng, Zuni Icosahedron, Sin Cha Hong, poets Kimiko Hahn & Shu Ting, playwright David Henry Hwang, and artist Zhang Hongtu. Several dance company performances are currently archived in video format at the New York Public Library for the Performing Arts at Lincoln Center.

AAAC has produced exhibition catalogs, videos, and sound recordings that document visual arts, oral traditions, music, and performances. ARTSPIRAL, a magazine published by AAAC that focuses broadly on citywide Asian American cultural issues, ran as an annual print publication from 1988 to 1993; it was revived in 2008 as an online blog. The Artists-in-Residence program, which supported 19 young artists in total, including Nina Kuo, Zhang Hongtu, Margo Machida, Yong Soon Min, Byron Kim, and Dinh Q. Lê, concluded in 1993.

==== 1993 – 2010 ====
After 1993 AAAC's programs consisted of four areas: (1) contemporary Asian American art exhibitions, (2) folk art exhibitions and research, (3) public education, and (4) the development of a permanent collection. These programs encompassed the preservation of Asian cultural traditions as well as the development of contemporary Asian and Asian American art forms.

AAAC's main annual exhibition presented young Asian American artists or artists significantly influenced by Asia. The Arts Centre also organized annual solo exhibitions for mid-career artists. Contemporary artists who have exhibited at AAAC include Vito Acconci, Ai Weiwei, Tomie Arai, Shusaku Arakawa, Natvar Bhavsar, Wafaa Bilal, Luis Camnitzer, Chen Zhen, Emily Cheng, Mel Chin, Albert Chong, Kip Fulbeck, Chitra Ganesh, Gu Wenda, Zarina Hashmi, Tehching Hsieh, Venancio C. Igarta, Yun-Fei Ji, Indira Freitas Johnson, Matsumi Kanemitsu, Ik-Joong Kang, Byron Kim, Swati Khurana, Barbara Kruger, Nina Kuo, Anna Kuo, Kwok Man Ho, Dinh Q. Lê, Simone Leigh, Choong Sup Lim, Nam June Paik, Alfonso A. Ossorio, Howardena Pindell, Faith Ringgold, Tara Sabharwal, Toshio Sasaki, Dread Scott, Roger Shimomura, Kunie Sugiura, Tam Van Tran, Tseng Kwong Chi, Toyo Tsuchiya, Martin Wong, Xu Bing, Lily Yeh, Charles Yuen, Danny N. T. Yung, and Zhang Hongtu. Fred Wilson guest curated an exhibition titled Aurora in 1990. AAAC partnered with the Teachers College at Columbia University in 1994 to hold a joint conference and exhibition titled Asian American Art and Culture in American Ambiance and Betrayal/Empowerment respectively.

The Folk Art program consisted of performances, lectures, and exhibitions, and presented traditional artists during the Lunar New Year every year. AAAC produced a collection of materials—including a video documentary titled Singing to Remember in 1971; and later in 2000, CD audio recordings, essays, and song lyrics compiled in a book titled Uncle Ng Comes to America—that captured the life story and artistry of Ng Sheung Chi, also known as Uncle Ng. Ng, a native of Taishan County in southwestern China—a region that generated the majority of Chinese immigrants to Chinatown before the passage of the Immigration and Nationality Act of 1965—immigrated to the U.S. in 1979. Ng became well known in New York's Chinatown as a singer and composer of muk'yu, or wooden fish, a type of narrative folk song typically sung in the Toisanese dialect. Gaining national recognition as a folk artist due to the Arts Centre's efforts, Ng was awarded the National Heritage Fellowship in 1992. The Folk Art program also showcased traditions such as seal carving, shadow puppets, pointed brush technique in Chinese calligraphy, and ornamental art in classical Chinese architecture. As a gateway for artists, dancers, staff, interns, students, teachers, volunteers, and audience, AAAC has passed on the traditional and contemporary dynamics of its community's heritage.

The Public Education program began with figure drawing classes, evolving to offer gallery talks, performances, tai chi workshops, and the on-site Saturday Community Art School for children. The off-site education programs took place in public and private schools, and in other community sites in the five boroughs in New York. "Stories of Chinatown", an off-site program organized in partnership with M.S. 131 that ran from 2001 to 2007, brought local seniors and youth together to make ceramic mural portraits portraying the seniors' lives.

A frequent recipient and benefactor of government grants from the National Endowment for the Arts (NEA) since the 1970s, the Arts Centre experienced a loss in funding when Congress reduced the NEA's annual budget from $180 million to $99.5 million in 1996 as a result of pressure from conservative American interest groups and Congress members including the American Family Foundation, Heritage Foundation, and former U.S. Senator Jesse Helms amid controversy around government funding toward sexually explicit art by artists such as Robert Mapplethorpe and Andres Serrano. This also impacted the availability of state- and city-level grant funding from the New York State Council on the Arts (NYSCA) and New York City Department of Cultural Affairs (DCLA), both of which receive funding from the NEA. As a local cultural non-profit that derived a large portion of its budget from public funding, AAAC was forced to scale back its programming from the mid-1990s to the late-2000s.

=== Norfolk location (2010–present) ===
In 2010, AAAC officially moved its location from 26 Bowery to 111 Norfolk Street. No longer possessing a gallery space, the Arts Centre continues to remain active in the Lower Manhattan community by organizing off-site exhibitions and panel discussions, and by pursuing public arts education through its blog, social media sites, and contributions to publications such as Asian American Matters: A New York Anthology by Russell Leong. Concurrently, AAAC has redistributed much of its organizational activity towards archival documentation, historical record-keeping, and organizing its extensive permanent collection. As part of its off-site programming, the Arts Centre has frequently collaborated with the New Museum's biennial Ideas City Festival—in 2013, it hosted a panel discussion at the Festival titled Space Time: Presence that addressed concepts of quantum space-time in both an aesthetic and scientific context. In collaboration with Think!Chinatown in 2018, AAAC produced a video introduction to fifty artists in its archive, made public in its Art Across Archives program.

Along with 20 other New York City-based organizations including the Caribbean Cultural Center African Diaspora Institute, En Foco, and Picture the Homeless, AAAC has both endorsed and received an endorsement from the People's Cultural Plan (PCP), an equity initiative launched in 2017 to redistribute city government funding and support to artists, art workers, tenants, community art organizations, and various historic neighborhoods in New York City. The PCP's policy plan for the city is made up of three platforms: equitable housing, land, and development policies; labor equity; and public funding equity.

== Selected exhibitions and performances ==
=== Selected exhibitions ===
- 1982: Eye to Eye
- 1987: The Mind's I: Part 1, 2, 3, 4
- 1988: Public Art in Chinatown
- 1989: CHINA: June 4, 1989
- 1992: And He Was Looking for Asia: Alternatives to the Story of Christopher Columbus Today
- 1993: Milieu: Part I, II (1996), and III (2000)
- 1995: Ancestors: A Collaborative Project with Kenkeleba House
- 1997: Three Generations: Towards an Asian American Art History
- 1999: 7lb9oz: The Reintegration of Tradition into Contemporary Art
- 2006: DETAINED
- 2006: THREE WOMEN: Art and Spiritual Practice
- 2007: Mixed Skin
- 2009: Out of the Archive: Process and Progress

=== Selected performances ===
- 1976: ID 1, 2, 3
- 1978: Madhouse
- 1979: Passage
- 1981: Kampuchea
- 1982: Origami
- 1983: Silk Road
- 1986: Orientalism
- 1988: D'Asia Vu: Journey to the West
- 1989: D'Asia Vu: Public Site/Public Language
- 1990: D'Asia Vu: Reclining Bodies (Focus on Artists from Hong Kong)

== Archive ==
The Arts Centre includes a digital and physical archive. The archive documents Asian American art over the last 60-plus years, and in many cases, the relationship between the artist and AAAC. The physical archive, which is stored at 111 Norfolk Street, consists of approximately 1700 entries of artists' materials, including biographical materials, publications, statements, project plans, reviews, exhibition materials (press releases, fliers, etc.), catalogs, taped interviews, and samples of works via slides, photographs and/or digital files. The digital archive, which accounts for 10% of the physical archive and contains over 170 entries, is called artasiamerica and is accessible online.

== See also ==
- Asian American Dance Theatre
- List of museums and cultural institutions in New York City
- Asian Americans in arts and entertainment
