= Basement Workshop =

- Founders: Danny Yung

Basement Workshop emerged as the first Asian-American political and arts organization in New York City, in existence from 1970 to 1986. Created during the Asian American Movement, it became an umbrella organization for a diverse group of young Asian-Americans seeking creative and new ways of intersecting artistic expression with political and community activism. The rise of the Black Power Movement and protests against the Vietnam War provided a partial yet weighty backdrop for Basement’s inception.

Basement Workshop’s original mission was steeped in language suggestive of community grassroots mobilization. The goals spoke of "trying to understand ourselves and our communities; trying to provide resources to serve our people.” Specific objectives included community service education programs, including language classes, and media such as a monthly magazine and newsletters.

Basement Workshop’s formative years became shaped by a loose and disparate group of visual, performing, and spoken word artists, writers, and politicized community advocates. Some were drop-ins, while others committed themselves for longer stretches. Some shared either compatible or competing loyalties with other community initiatives, such as community education activities, the promotion of affordable health care services, and the pursuit of Maoist political ideology.

Regardless, many of the Basement Workshop members were themselves in the discovery stages of their own personal development and artistic direction as they sought to redefine and affirm a proud Asian American identity and heritage in a society that continued to marginalize Asian American groups. By offering inspiration, Basement Workshop emboldened many to test their own creative vision, whether personal or collective, within an activist context of racial injustice and political oppression.

== History ==
Started by a group of young urban planning students from Columbia University, including Danny N.T. Yung, who had helped form the Chinatown Study Group leading to the Chinatown Report 1969, Basement Workshop legally incorporated in 1970. As suggested by its name, Basement Workshop began in a tenement-like basement at 54 Elizabeth Street. It later moved to a space at 22 Catherine Street, and then to a loft at 199 Lafayette St. The Basement Workshop's community arm, Community Planning Workshop (CPW), moved to 22 Catherine St. from at 1 East Broadway, where it held English as a Second Language and citizen classes for several years.

Basement Workshop’s initial projects included the Asian American Resource Center, which sought to compile information and resources on Asian American history and communities; and Bridge Magazine, a seminal quarterly publication that discussed relevant Asian cultural and political issues in the United States and abroad. It was at this juncture that Basement began expanding its ambition to include more artistic endeavors.

Basement Workshop’s emphasis on media, including Bridge’s inclusion of art and creative writing, worked as the impetus for attracting a wider group of young Asian Americans seeking a uniquely Asian American artistic expression. The magazine lasted from 1971 to 1978. In 1972, Basement Workshop published the iconic visual arts collection, Yellow Pearl. Designed as a record album-size boxset of portfolio artwork, Yellow Pearl included poetry, song lyrics, and visual art.

Basement Workshop offered both a kind of mental and physical space which fostered the initiation of projects that later morphed into separate and independent artistic and cultural endeavors. In this spirit, Yellow Pearl was soon followed in 1973 by the independent release of the record album, "a grain of sand," with songs written and sung by Chris Iijima, Joanne Nobuku Miyamoto, and Charlie Chin. Amerasia Creative Arts, formed around this time in 1973, became Basement's visual arts arm. It produced publicity materials, including various graphics and posters for community events, including a community-wide demonstration against police brutality at City Hall.

In addition to early members as urban designer/artist Danny Yung, dancer/choreographer Eleanor Yung, and singer-songwriters Charlie Chin, Chris Iijima, and Joanne Noboku Miyamoto, Basement Workshop attracted other artists, as well. Many were emergent. Some were politically active: These included photographer Corky Lee; muralist and visual artist Tomie Arai; poet Fay Chiang; painter Arlan Huang; multimedia artists Larry Hama and Nina Kuo; musician Jason Kao Hwang; actor Tzi Ma; playwright Frank Chin; and writers Henry Chang and Jessica Hagedorn. Community activists included physicist Michio Kaku, and Robert Takashi Yanagida. This list, truncated as it is, does not embrace the entire cadre of unnamed artists and community advocates whose participation helped give contour to Basement Workshop’s complexity.

One of Basement Workshop’s original objectives included offering English classes. Often overlooked within Basement Workshop’s range of creative initiatives, CPW became Basement Workshop’s community arm. CPW held weekend English language and citizenship classes for adult Chinese immigrants, taught by a group of young volunteers, who were mostly Asian American. In the mid-1970s, when Basement Workshop members were caught up in fervent discussions and debates over the direction of their core organizational mission -- whether it should be more a political or arts organization -- CPW volunteers remained tied to addressing some of Chinatown’s more elemental needs. These volunteers, who tended to be more service-oriented, gravitated toward CPW, some after having participated in various other or Basement Workshop-sponsored community activities, such as the Chinatown Health Fair in 1972, and Basement Workshop’s own daycare center and arts program, Children at Basement.

Basement Workshop’s various other arts projects and programs included silk-screening, dance choreography, photography, film workshops, and acting workshops, as the one taught by Mako, fresh from his Tony-nominated role in the 1976 Broadway musical, Pacific Overtures. Basement also sponsored community arts exhibitions and various school- and youth-based arts programs.

Basement Workshop’s evolution embodied the larger trajectory of Asian American resistance art and culture. During its decade and a half, Basement Workshop catalyzed the development of numerous other initiatives and organizations, including the Asian American Dance Theater, Asian American Arts Centre, Asian CineVision, Godzilla Asian American Arts Network, and the Chinatown Historical Project, which eventually led to the formation of the Museum of Chinese in America.

By 1986, when Basement Workshop closed, it had developed four distinct arts and community silos: Asian American Resource Center; Bridge Magazine; Amerasia Creative Arts; and Community Planning Workshop. Even as Basement Workshop ended in 1986, its legacy endures. Basement Workshop impacted its members and the Asian American community in different ways, and this often depended on when and how they connected with Basement Workshop. Many gained a profoundly personal yet collective sense of what it meant to be Asian American, particularly in the 1970s and 1980s through the lens of art, politics, community activism, and youthful idealism. In the Asian American arts community, certainly, Basement Workshop's influence was far-reaching. Basement Workshop ignited, incited, engendered, and influenced: Members and those on the periphery injected, rejected, refused, and infused; and ultimately the Asian American community received and conceived.
