= Asian American Dance Theatre =

US non-profit organization

The Asian American Dance Theatre (AADT) was a dance performance and educational non-profit organization in New York. It featured traditional Asian folk and classical dances along with contemporary pieces that evoke Asian forms and sensibilities. AADT was a pioneer in the development of Asian American dance. AADT also created several programs to expose the public to different forms of Asian dance and culture, and created a community school to provide lessons on many dance forms as well as art.

AADT was founded by Eleanor S. Yung in 1974. In 1987, AADT became the Asian American Arts Centre (AAAC).

== History ==
In the early 1970s, there were very few Asian American public dance performances in New York City, and few dancers actively performing traditional Asian dance. There was a general misconception and exoticization of traditional Asian dance. In addition, there were few opportunities for choreographers of Asian American contemporary dance

In 1974, Eleanor S. Yung founded AADT as both a performance venue and a producer of Asian-American works. It began as an outgrowth of the Asian American Dance Workshop of the Basement Workshop.

In 1974, AADT started a dance performance season in New York featuring works from Yung and guest choreographers. AADT performed at the Riverside Dance Festival, the Marymount Manhattan Theater, the Pace University Schimmel Center, the Dance Theater Workshop, Open Eye, Clark Center for the Performing Arts, and Synod House.

The ADDT performances received coverage in the New York Times, Village Voice, Dance Magazines, NY Post, Bridge Magazine, by critics such as Jennifer Dunning, Jack Anderson, and Burt Supree. Yung's signature piece “Passage” received acclaim from dance critic Jennifer Dunning. In her piece “Silk road”, Yung collaborated with Zhang Hong-Tu. .

Dancers who participated in the AADT seasons include Marie Alonzo, Annie Bien, Fa ChingChu, Lauren Dong, Tomie Hahn, Sharon Hom, Junko Kikuchi, Young Soon Kim, Julio Leitao, Yen Leung, Lynn Macri, George Mars, Pam Noschese, Nancee Sasaki, Ray Tadio, Nayo Takahashi, Michiyo Tanaka, Helen Tran, Muna Tseng, Yung Yung Tsuai, and Dwight Wigfall..

During the 1980s, the AADT Traditional Repertoire toured Texas, Ohio, North Carolina, New Mexico, Wisconsin, and Massachusetts, and others, performing to large audiences, both outdoor and indoor. AADT performed at Sister Fire in Washington DC, and at the Michigan Womyn's Music Festival. It did a nine-campus tour for the Penn State University system. The tour dancers included Najma Ayasha, Deena Burton, Ananya Chatterjie, Arundhati Chattopadhyaya, Kuang Yu Fong, Chen Guo, Sachiyo Ito, Nancy Latuja, Young Lan Lee, Janaki Patrick, Marlene Pitkow, Carla Scheele, and Kathy Serio.

In 1987, AADT became the Asian American Arts Centre (AAAC). In 1990, the dance season in New York ended and in 1997, the community school ended.

== Arts in Education program ==
AADT started a lecture demonstration program of traditional Asian dance for the New York Public School System. These events took place at community centers and public libraries. Newsly arrived professional dancers from Asia, became members of the traditional repertoire. The performers, in full costume, spoke about the art form, the people and culture to students.

The AADT also started an 8-week Workshop Program in Indian Dance and in Chinese Dance. The program used study guides written by MeriLobel.

In 1985, AADT started the Pointed Brush program, a visual arts workshop, conducted by Nora Shih for public school students. It ran until the late 1980s.

In 1986 AADT initiated D'Asia Vu, a showcase of Asian and Asian influenced performances in puppetry, theater, mask dances, a dancer on skates, to the Guzheng,.

The first D’Asia vu presentation took place at the Balinese American Dance Theater in New York before moving back to AADT space. The performances included Kuang Yu Fong premiering her original creation, "A Day at the Office", Tomie Hahn first performing "Leaf", Bell Yung performing on the Guqin, the Leela Puppets, and East-West Fusion.

== Community school ==
In 1974, AADT started offering ballet classes for children in the Chatham Square Public Library. In 1976, AADT moved to its own space at and expanded to creative dance and children art classes. It also offered adult Chinese painting and calligraphy, Chinese dance, Jazz, Alexander technique, Jazzercise, tai chi, and ballroom dancing.

Children's classes took place on the weekends while adult classes usually in the evenings. The loft space was divided into a dance studio and an art classroom. AADT held annual dance recitals for the children at public school PS 124.

== See also ==
- Asian American Arts Centre
