= Indira Freitas Johnson =

Indian artist

- Born: Indira Freitas Johnson; 1943 (age 82–83); Mumbai, India

Indira Freitas Johnson (born 1943) is an artist and nonviolence educator.

Johnson was born and raised in Mumbai, India and received a Bachelor of Arts in English Literature from the University of Mumbai in 1964, and a four-year diploma in Applied Arts from Sir J.J. Institute of Applied Art in 1964. In 1965, Johnson was awarded a grant to study at the School of the Art Institute of Chicago where she received a Master of Fine Arts in 1967. Johnson was invited to teach graduate level classes at the School of the Art Institute of Chicago in Ceramic Sculpture in 1998 and at the Rhode Island School of Design in Public Art in 2001.

Johnson is the recipient of numerous grants and awards, including the Governor's Award for the Arts, Kohler Company Arts and Industry Grant, Arts ConText, Rhode Island School of Design Museum and the Pew Charitable Trust, Arts International Travelling Fellowship, Raven Foundation, and the Illinois Arts Council.

Johnson's work is represented in numerous major public and private collections including: Chicago Museum of Contemporary Art, Asian American Arts Centre in New York, Rhode Island School of Design Museum in Providence, Mobile Museum of Art in Mobile Alabama, State of Illinois Building in Chicago, Ankor Consultants in Brussels, High Museum of Art in Atlanta, Arkansas Arts Center and Decorative Arts Museum in Little Rock, Arkansas, University of Illinois Law School in Carbondale, Illinois, SHARE in Mumbai India, High Museum of Art in Atlanta GA, Air India Corporation in Mumbai, India, Kohler Company in Sheboygan Wisconsin, and Garden/Varelli in Mumbai India.

== Public art projects ==
As an artist, Johnson's identity has evolved as part sculptor, cultural worker, peace activist and educator. Her numerous studio art work and community engaged projects explore an array of social issues including the cultural dimension of domestic violence, leprosy health education, labor, the environment, gender, peace, nonviolence and literacy. Johnson makes use of a "call and response" tradition that results in a final project that includes community voices and input.

Her public art projects include:

- Peace Offering, 2020, took place on Sunday, October 4, 2020 at the Dammrich Rowing Center in Skokie, Illinois. The event was organized by the Year of Kindness and Nonviolent Action, a Public Art and Community Engagement initiative that uses the transformative power of the arts to unite Evanstonians around a common goal—creating a more inclusive, peaceful and kind community. For this event, members of the community had the option to participate by inscribing the leaves with messages of hope or by submitting their messages online and having the organizers inscribe their messages for them. The resulting leaves were joined together in different patterns and then launched into the North Shore Channel of the Chicago River. Together, we watched the offering float south.
- Hand in Hand, 2020, is a series of wall sculptures installed in the entryways to the eight neighborhoods that make up the Chicago Veterans Center. The pieces capture hearts and minds by creating a welcoming, engaging and positive visual environment for Veterans, their friends, and their families. Rooted in interconnection, Hand In Hand suggests that wellbeing happens when an individual feels the power of connection to those around them. This idea reinforces the Chicago Veterans Centers’ belief that once embraced by their community, Veterans can ultimately receive the support and care that they need.
- Journey Into Possibilities, 2018, connects the different spaces of the Lincoln Hall Advising Center at the University of Illinois. This work was designed to have a calming and nurturing effect on students as they travel through their educational journey.
- Art Institute of Chicago's King Day Festival: Lift Every Voice, 2017, participants traced their footprints and then illustrated them with their commitment to change. Hundreds of participants contributed to the growing spiral of footprints that followed the legacy of Dr. Martin Luther King Jr. and his vision for a more hopeful future where there is freedom, equality and justice for all people.
- Growing Capabilities, Changing the Face of the Golibar Slum in Mumbai, 2017, is a collaboration with Marketplace: Handwork of India, a collective that empowers women in India to break the cycle of poverty as they become leaders in their neighborhoods. The façade of their headquarters was drab and dingy just like the rest of the structures in the Golibar. Brainstorming together, we discussed the values inherent to the Marketplace philosophy and then translated this vision through symbols and color into a permanent mural work.
- Overlapping Connections, 2015, uses the Chinese welcome sign to offer passengers a moment of calm and beauty as they continue on their journey. This piece is permanently installed at the 18th Street Cermak-Chinatown CTA Station.
- Resonance of Emptiness, 2013, investigates the concept of emptiness and related ideas of impermanence and interconnectedness. Johnson was one of 9 international artists and 21 Korean artists invited to participate in the Haein Art Biennale in South Korea
- Ten Thousand Ripples, 2011–2013, is a multi-platform public arts project, a collaboration with cultural and community organizations from the city of Chicago. As part of the project, one hundred emerging Buddha heads were installed throughout the city in sites chosen by host community organizations located in Chicago's 50 wards. The goal of Ten Thousand Ripples was to provide the general community with an intense and meaningful public art experience outside of traditional art venues and in doing so act as a catalyst for community conversations and interactions about peace and nonviolence. Sites included parks, public plazas, alleys, libraries, building lobbies, and abandoned lots, Changing Worlds was the lead arts organization in a consortium of over 30 social service, educational, religious and arts organizations. In 2025, Johnson initiated a continuation of the project called Ripples for Peace, where participants were invited to add a decorated flag to a temporary art installation located at the site of the original Ten Thousand Ripples sculpture installation.
- Growing Peace, 2011, consisted of Johnson creating a five-acre field sculpture. It revolves around themes of the power of human perspective and its relationship to the process of finding peace within civilization. Johnson uses the universal symbol of a foot, which she says grounds us to the earth and gives us stability
- 25th Bowl, 2010, was an exhibition at the Illinois State Museum, Chicago Gallery, which explored themes of interconnectedness, and water sustainability issues.
- Community Blessings are Rangolis, a South Asian folk art tradition where a woman welcomes the day by painting patterns on the threshold of her home to ensure the well-being of her family. Rangolis use traditional materials like rice flour, turmeric, earth, and flower petals and nontraditional materials like found objects and recycled materials. The first ‘Community Blessings" was in downtown Evanston right after the tragedy of 9/11 where the community came together to express their sorrow and their hope. Johnson has facilitated Community Blessings in diverse communities ranging from Providence, RI 2001, The Chicago Field Museum, 2004, Illinois Wesleyan University, 2004, Contemporary Art Center, Peoria, IL, 2006, SHARE, Mumbai, India, 2006 Parkland College, Champaign, IL, 2009.
- Hand in Hand, 2009, was displayed at the College of St. Catherine in St. Paul Minnesota. It questions the nature of "free" labor and investigates the basic transference of energy which is present in every form of exchange whether, physical, emotional, economic or psychic.
- Conversations: Here and Now, 2008, was commissioned by the City of Evanston, IL. Public meetings were held throughout the city to involve the community in planning the sculpture. Today, Conversations: Here and Now, has become a city landmark, a space for conversation.
- Where Sky Meets Water, 2007, sponsored by Chicago Cultural Center's Public Art Program engaged passersby, random people who helped float over 800 leaves in the Chicago River, in a ritual offering for peace.
- Enough; Indira Freitas Johnson and Voices from around the World, 2003, was sponsored by the Chicago Museum of Contemporary Art, and involved women from the Golibar slum of Mumbai and a wide range of people from the Chicago area and around the world in the question of how much is enough and what do we all really want.
- FREENOTFREE, 2001, sponsored by the RISD Museum and the Pew Charitable Trust where Johnson worked intensely with a literacy group from the Rhode Island Public Library as well as collected stories from the wider Providence Community.
- Voices of Shakti; Pain, Struggle, Courage, a collaboration with women from Apna Ghar, a Chicago-based South Asian domestic violence shelter, which used words, objects and floor drawings to demonstrate the South Asian cultural dimension of domestic violence. This show traveled from Artemisia Gallery, Chicago, 1994, to Beacon Street Gallery, 1995, Illinois Wesleyan University, Bloomington, IL 1996, College of St. Catherine, St. Paul, MN 1998.
- Our Own Vision, 1990, was Indira Johnson's first public art project, a collaboration with a Local Bombay NGO and the Indian Western Railway around leprosy health education. Working with a group of tribal children who had been affected by leprosy, Indira and partners painted a commuter train that ran between Mumbai and the far suburbs and spread the message of leprosy's curability to thousands of people.

== Selected solo exhibitions ==
- BeLonging. Solo Show, The Highland Park Center, Highland Park, IL, 2023
- Gathering of Energy, Bray Grove Farm, Morris, IL, 2022
- The Resonance of Emptiness, Evanston Art Center, Evanston, IL, 2021
- Energy Reboot: The Art of Indira Freitas Johnson, Krasl Art Center, St. Joseph, MI, 2012
- Opposition and Unity, Parkland College Gallery, Champaign, IL, 2009
- Satyagraha; Holding Fast to Truth, Chicago Public Library, Chicago, IL, 2007
- Lifetime Offer, Dimensions Variable, Chicago Cultural Center, Chicago IL, 2007
- Indira Freitas Johnson, Sculpture and Found Objects, Walsh Gallery, Chicago, IL 2004
- Indira Freitas Johnson; A Merging of Two Cultures, Contemporary Arts Center, Peoria, IL, 2004
- Transforming Materials; Uniting the Physical and the Spiritual. Illinois Wesleyan University, Bloomington, IL 2003
- Process of Karma, Indianapolis Art Center Indianapolis IN, 2000
- Vehicles of Transformation, Chicago Cultural Center, Chicago, IL, 1993
- Storm Shelters and Other Works, Evanston Art Center, Evanston, IL, 1991
- Double Vision, Prince of Wales Museum, Bombay, India, 1990

== Selected group exhibitions ==
- Moving Forward in a time of Change: Our New Relationship to the World We Live In, Ukrainian Institute of Modern Art, 2020
- Vice / Virtue, Northern Illinois University, DeKalb IL, 2013
- Streamlines, Ephemeral Presence in Contemporary Art, Mahaprajapati Vihar, Vaishali, India, 2013
- Infinite Mirror, Images of American Identity, International Art and Artists National touring exhibition, 2011–2014
- Pathways and Portals; Art, Nature and Science, Illinois State Museum, 2010–11
- 798 Art Zone, Kohler Company's Arts/Industry collection, Beijing, China, 2009
- Erasing Borders, Indo American Arts Center, New York, 2007
- Life InSight; The Human Experience, Kentucky Museum of Art & Craft, Louisville, KY, 2006
- Poetic Expression of Mortality: Figurative Ceramics from the Porter Price Collection, Mobile Museum of Art, Mobile AL 2005
- Fatal Love, Queens Museum, Queens, New York, 2005
- Particles and Passion: The Art of Clay, Academy Art Museum, Easton, MD, 2004
- Honoring Tradition, Perceptions of Three Asian American Artists, Ball State Museum, Muncie, IN, 2004
- Masala, Diversity and Democracy in South Asian Art, William Benton Museum of Art, University of Connecticut, 2004

== Residencies ==
- Anderson Ranch, Snowmass, CO. (1998 & 1999), St Catherine's University, 1991 and 2009
- Adrian College, Adrian, MI 2001
- Kohler Company, Sheboygan, WI, Lakeside Studio, Lakeside, MI, 1989
- A long term residency at SHARE in one of the slums of Mumbai, India. It is a spiritual experience to go back every year and work in Golibar, where her family has worked for over 30 years. SHARE is part of Marketplace Handwork of India an organization that provides employment opportunities and leadership training for women and persons with disabilities in India (www.share.com)

== Additional work ==
In 1993, in response to ethnic violence in the world, Johnson founded Shanti Foundation for Peace, whose mission is to use the processes of art to help people understand that their individual action can make a difference in the world. Since then Johnson has been teaching art and nonviolence decision-making skills to children in Chicago and Evanston area public schools.

In addition, Johnson has shared creativity and knowledge with numerous groups including Chicago Historical Society, Loyola University, Chicago, IL, Christian Brothers University, Memphis, TN, and in 2017 participated on "The Power of Individual Action", TEDx Columbia College Chicago. She was a Round Table Presenter at the 4th International Congress of Educating Cities, The Arts and Humanities As Agents of Social Change, Keynote speaker for Drawing Art Together, Sponsored by Getty Center for Education, a panelist at Daughters of Revolution: Gender, Ethnicity, Art, Cincinnati Art Museum, Cincinnati, OH 1992, Multi-Ethnic Voices and Main Stream [sic] Aesthetics Chicago International New Art Forms Expo. Chicago, 1990.
