= AADT (disambiguation) =

AADT is an abbreviation for a measure of transportation known as "annual average daily traffic".

AADT may also refer to:

- Alvin Ailey Dance Theater, a former American dance company
- Asian American Dance Theatre, a former American dance company
