= Scottsdale Museum of Contemporary Art =

Art museum

Scottsdale Museum of Contemporary Art (SMoCA)
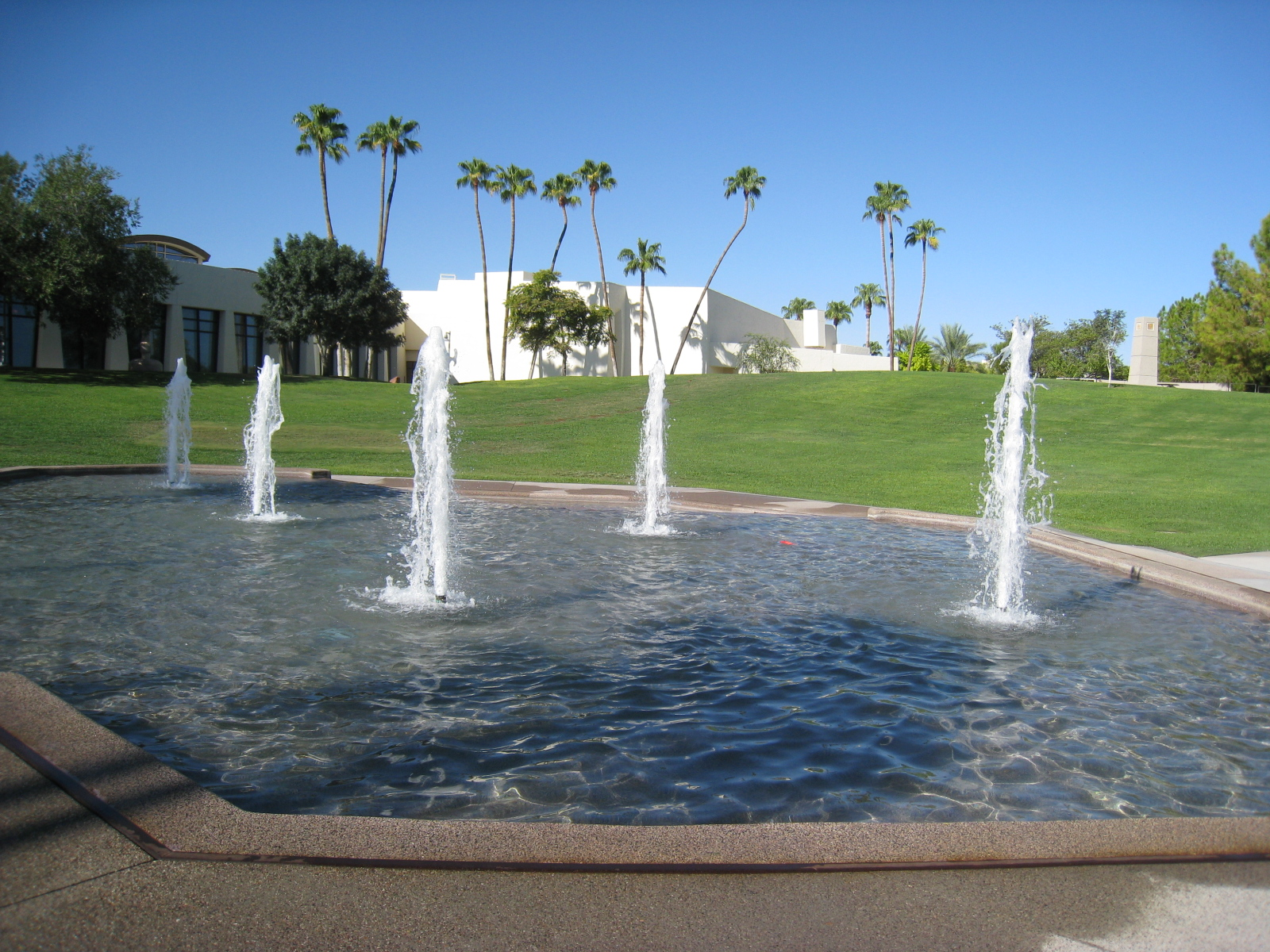
- Established: 1999
- Location: 7374 E. 2nd St; Scottsdale, AZ 85251 United States
- Coordinates: 33.491709°N 111.923034°W
- Type: Art
- Director: Jennifer McCabe
- Website: smoca.org

Scottsdale Museum of Contemporary Art (SMoCA) in the state of Arizona is a museum in the Old Town district of downtown Scottsdale, Arizona. The museum is dedicated to contemporary art, design, and architecture. The Museum has five galleries that house various exhibitions, curated from their growing permanent collection and rotating shows. Knight Rise skyspace, by Arizona artist James Turrell, is permanently on view.

== History ==
SMoCA was conceived in 1988 and opened in February 1999. The now-evocative, minimalist building is a complete retrofit by Phoenix-based architect Will Bruder of a former movie theater.

The museum is run for the city by Scottsdale Arts, a non-profit corporation.

SMoCA has featured major exhibitions from artists such as Lydia Okumura, James Marshall, Paolo Soleri, Squidsoup, Mel Roman, and Olafur Eliasson.

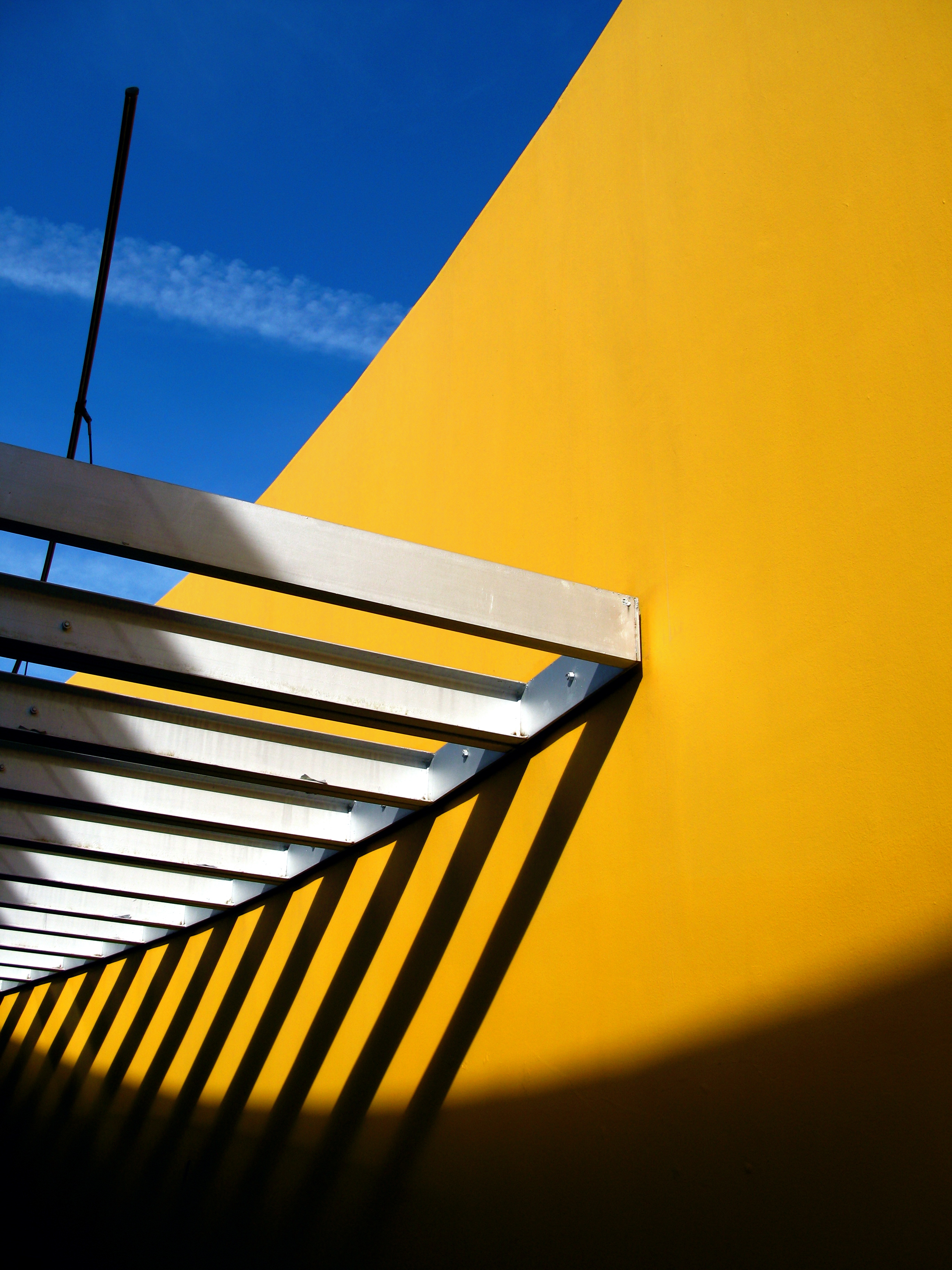
Atrium at Scottsdale Museum of Contemporary Arts.
