= Ten Thousand Ripples =

Collaborative social project

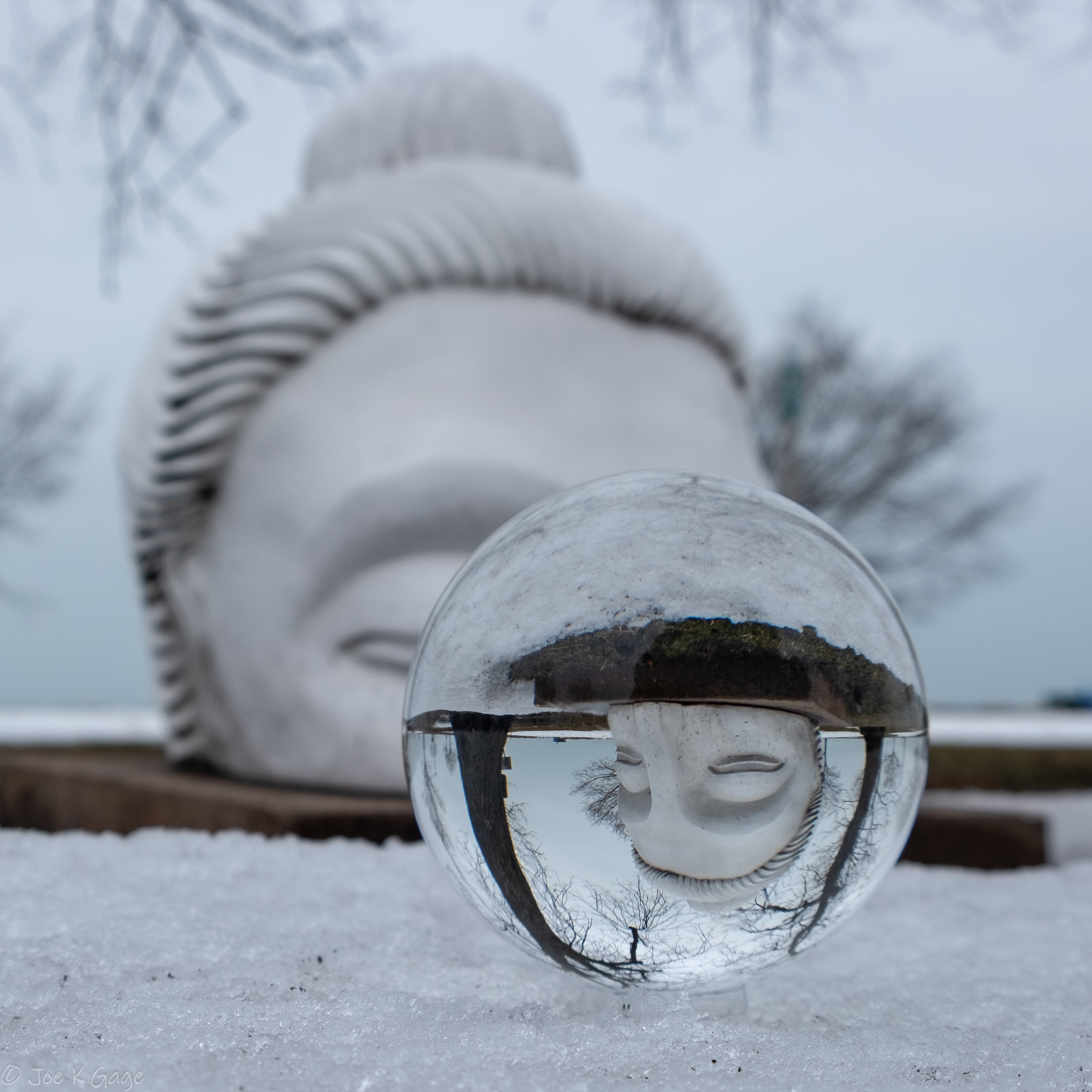
- A lensball photo of one of the Buddha sculptures, 2021
- Artist: Indira Freitas Johnson
- Year: 2013
- Type: Public art and civic engagement project
- Medium: Fiberglass and resin sculptures, weighted with concrete
- Dimensions: 100 sculptures
- Location: Various public sites across Chicago and Evanston, Illinois

Ten Thousand Ripples (TTR) is a collaborative public art and civic engagement project initiated in Chicago, Illinois, by artist Indira Freitas Johnson in partnership with the nonprofit organization Changing Worlds, founded by Will Tenan. According to the artist, the project incorporates public art to generate discussion on peace and nonviolence, and explores responses to contemporary social issues. Central to TTR are 100 fiberglass and resin Buddha sculptures, each weighted with several hundred pounds of concrete, designed by Johnson and installed in ten neighborhoods across the Chicago area. The project involves artists, neighborhood leaders, and residents in community-driven planning and public engagement.

TTR is a partnership between Indira Johnson and Changing Worlds. Guided by a city-wide advisory council, TTR implements strategies to engage communities and bring together participants from multiple sectors. The project is based on the idea that structured dialogue can build trust and understanding, and that public art can facilitate discussion of social issues and support neighborhood development. Each community implements its own approach to engagement. Common features include dialogue sessions, artistic programming, public art installations, and arts-integrated community development plans.

== Background ==
The concept of TTR emerged after Johnson exhibited her early Buddha sculptures at the Chicago Cultural Center. Viewers reported a sense of calm while interacting with the sculptures, leading Johnson to explore their placement in public spaces such as storefronts and vacant lots.

In 2010, the Richard H. Driehaus Foundation provided a grant to support the project’s development and explore the impact of public sculpture in communities. Local foundations funded the production of sculptures, with communities contributing to the installation costs. Johnson established an Advisory Council with leaders from arts, social service, community, and educational sectors to guide the project and consulted residents on sculpture placement. Changing Worlds partnered with Johnson in 2011 to serve as the lead agency, facilitating goal-setting, community engagement frameworks, and planning for neighborhood implementation.

TTR shifted from centralized planning to community-led engagement, using research and consultations with secular and faith leaders. Through forums, arts planning, and resident-selected sites, each neighborhood received ten sculptures to support dialogue, arts programming, and collaboration.

== Current project ==
By spring 2013, 100 Buddha heads had been produced and installed across ten neighborhoods, including Albany Park, Pilsen, Rogers Park, South Chicago, Uptown, North Lawndale, Little Village, Auburn Gresham, Back of the Yards and Evanston. According to project documentation, the placement focused on neighborhoods with higher rates of crime and violence to encourage reflection and dialogue on social concerns. Community responses included parades, bike tours, school programs, peace processions, and the creation of Peace Parks.

In late summer 2013, five sculptures from each community were displayed at the Loyola University Museum of Art from July 20 to November 3, intended to highlight community engagement and art projects associated with TTR. Remaining sculptures in each neighborhood are expected to support discussions on peace and non-violence, and other projects have been created in art, dance, literature, film, and photography.

== Controversy ==
Some commentators have raised concerns that the project represents cultural appropriation. A panel was held at the Buddhist Temple of Chicago where various cultures and ethnicities were able to discuss opinions about the artwork. Johnson has stated that the Buddha images are used without religious intent.
