= Semaphore Gallery =

Art gallery in New York City

Semaphore Gallery was a contemporary art gallery founded by Barry Blinderman and A. James Shapiro in 1980 in New York City, located at 462 West Broadway in the SoHo, Manhattan district. In 1984, Semaphore East was also established on the corner of 10th and Avenue B in the East Village, Manhattan district. Semaphore East closed in 1986, and Semaphore Soho moved to 136 Greene Street, across from Leo Castelli. The gallery closed in the summer of 1987, when Blinderman accepted the position of Director at University Galleries of Illinois State University.

== Name ==
Art dealer Ivan Karp, who named Semaphore Gallery, was referring to the power of an image to "telegraph" meaning.

== Artists represented ==
Semaphore Gallery championed the work of Walter Robinson, Duncan Hannah, Robert Colescott, Martin Wong, Mimi Gross, Joseph Nechvatal, Raymond Pettibon, Bobby G (a.k.a. Robert Goldman), Alexander Kosolapov, Futura 2000, Jane Dickson, Tseng Kwong Chi, Walter Steding, Cockrill/Judge Hughes, Mike Bidlo, Nancy Dwyer, Louise P. Sloane and others. In 1981, Blinderman curated The Anxious Figure, a seminal exhibition featuring Robert Colescott, Robert Longo, Alice Neel, Jedd Garet, John Ahearn, Dan Freeman, Mark Schwartz, Mimi Gross, Gregg Smith, Mike Glier, Ed Paschke, Peter Dean, and Keith Haring.

Semaphore East, directed by Annie Herron, hosted one-person exhibitions for Lady Pink, Lori Taschler, Keith Haring, Ellen Berkenblit, Janet McKiernan, Robert Colescott, Mark Kostabi, Felix Pène du Bois, Daryl Trivieri, Bobby G, and other artists.

Additional artists who had one-person exhibitions at Semaphore include: Walter Steding, Valentina Dubasky, Michael Ross, Dan Freeman, John Fekner, Dan Witz, Philip Ayers, Louise Sloane, Leonid Sokov, and David Prentice.

== See also ==
- Postmodern art
- Conceptual art
- Post-conceptual art
