= Roger Shimomura =

American artist (born 1939)

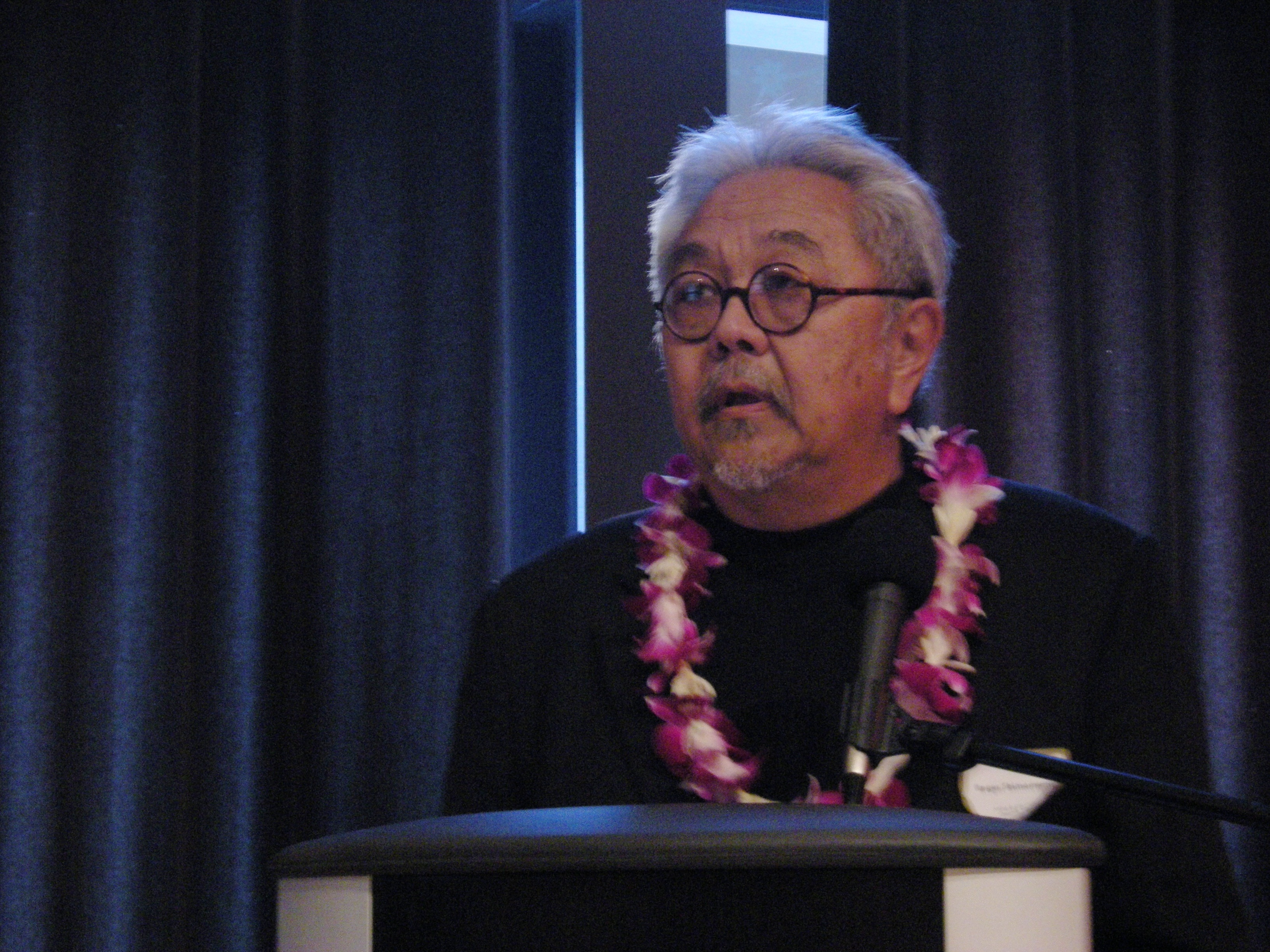
- Shimomura in 2009
- Born: Roger Yutaka Shimomura; June 26, 1939 (age 87); Seattle, Washington, U.S.

Roger Shimomura (born Roger Yutaka Shimomura in 1939 in Seattle) is an American artist and a retired professor at the University of Kansas, having taught there from 1969 to 2004. His art, showcased across the United States, Japan, Canada, Mexico, and Israel, often combines American popular culture, traditional Asian tropes, and stereotypical racial imagery to provoke thought and debate on issues of identity and social perception.

== Early life ==
Roger Shimomura was born on June 26, 1939, at the Shimomura family home in Seattle, Washington's Central District. He was delivered by his grandmother, Toku, a professional midwife who would become an important figure in his life and art. His father, Eddy Kazuo Shimomura, was a pharmacist, and his mother, Aya, was a homemaker. Both parents were U.S.-born nisei whose parents had emigrated from Japan in the early 1900s.

American Citizen #1, 2006, lithograph.

After the attack on Pearl Harbor, signing of Executive Order 9066, and the beginning of Japanese incarceration, his family was forcibly relocated on short notice and incarcerated at Camp Harmony in Puyallup, Washington. They were transported from there to the more permanent Minidoka camp in Idaho. After about two years at Minidoka, the family moved to Chicago (outside the West Coast Japanese exclusion zone), where Shimomura's father had secured a job in a pharmacy. The family lived there for a few months before returning to Seattle at war's end in 1945. Shimomura's younger sister Carolyn had died of meningitis during their stay in Chicago.

The family returned to their home in the Central District, and his father resumed his pharmacy work. Shimomura was not yet fully aware of the implications of the racial hierarchies around him. As a child in the postwar years, he played a game called "Kill the Jap" with the sons of artist Paul Horiuchi, who lived across the street. As he grew up, he felt increasing anguish over the conflict between his father's wish that he become a doctor, and his own desire to follow in the footsteps of his three uncles, who were all commercial artists.

== Education ==
After graduating from Garfield High School, Shimomura began studying graphic design at the University of Washington, earning his BA in 1961. He was required to join the ROTC (Reserve Officers' Training Corps) program. Despite his severe distaste for the program, he did very well in his military studies. From 1962 to 64 he served as an artillery officer in the 1st Cavalry Division, stationed at Fort Lewis, Washington, and in Korea.

After leaving the Army, Shimomura began working as a commercial artist and designer, including work on the Polynesian Pavilion at the New York World's Fair in 1964. He became frustrated with the limitations of the field. He began taking painting classes at the University of Washington, where, under the influence of the emerging Pop Art movement, he discovered the possibilities in combining fine art with his lifelong interest in pop culture. Transferring to Syracuse University in New York, where he experimented with filmmaking and performance art, Shimomura received his MFA degree in 1969. That same year, he took a job teaching art at the University of Kansas in Lawrence, Kansas. He taught there for the next 35 years, until his retirement in 2004.

== Career ==
Japs Galore, 2008.

In 2013, Shimomura told an interviewer,

"My biggest influences initially were the California Funk ceramics artists. Their irreverence helped me break out of my conservative Asian thinking mode. These clay artists said in their works that nothing was sacred, that we needed a fresh start and needed to examine everything. There was a sense that art could take a leadership role in this revolution."

He has also expressed admiration for the Pop Art movement, citing Andy Warhol as "my biggest influence, visually, historically, and stylistically".

Shimomura's paintings often take stereotypical American images of Asians: glowering, buck-toothed wartime "Japs", Fu Manchu, subservient geishas, martial artists, and skewer them through over-the-top exaggeration or juxtaposition with images of idealized American society. Pop culture icons such as Mickey Mouse, Coca-Cola, and Pikachu appear incongruously in bright, flat-perspective landscapes, sometimes with absurdly altered portraits of Shimomura himself. His more subtle works often combine traditional Japanese woodblock printing with impressions of the incarceration camps, taken from both his own youthful memories and passages from the diary that his grandmother Toku kept for many years.

While continuing to teach at the University of Kansas, Shimomura gradually became one of the most recognized artists in the United States, amassing awards and exhibition in many of the country's major museums and arts institutions. Since his retirement from teaching in 2004, he has continued painting, giving lectures, and exhibiting.

== Collections ==
His works are in the permanent collections of the Metropolitan Museum of Art (New York), the Whitney Museum of American Art (New York), the Smithsonian American Art Museum (Washington, D.C.), the Denver Art Museum, the Japanese American National Museum (Los Angeles, CA), the Seattle Art Museum, the Japanese Cultural and Community Center of Washington, the Detroit Institute of Arts, the New York Public Library, the Philadelphia Museum of Art, the Asian American Arts Centre (New York), the Phoenix Art Museum, the Tacoma Art Museum, the Spencer Museum of Art at the University of Kansas, the Marianna Kistler Beach Museum of Art at Kansas State University, the Ulrich Museum of Art at Wichita State University, the Mulvane Art Museum at Washburn University and other museums and institutions.

== Exhibitions ==
Shimomura's paintings and prints have been the subject of more than 150 solo exhibitions. In addition, he has participated in hundreds of group shows in museums, galleries, schools, and other institutions in the US, Japan, Canada, Mexico, and Israel.

His experimental theater pieces have been performed at such venues as the Smithsonian Institution (Washington, D.C.), the Franklin Furnace (New York City), the Walker Art Center (Minneapolis), and the Bellevue Arts Museum (Bellevue, Washington).

== Awards ==
Honors and awards include:

- 150th Anniversary Timeless Award, University of Washington College of Arts & Sciences, Seattle (2012)
- United States Artists Ford Fellow for Visual Arts (2011)
- First Kansas Master Artist Award in the Visual Arts, Kansas Arts Commission, Topeka, Kansas (2008)
- Joan Mitchell Foundation Painting Award, New York City (2003)
- Kansas Governor's Arts Award, Governor Joan Finney, Topeka, Kansas (1994)
- In 1999, the Seattle Urban League designated a scholarship in his name that has been awarded annually to a Seattle resident pursuing a career in art.

== Works cited ==
- Hackett, Regina (2004-03-11). "Shimomura explores racism in all its guises – from the racist's POV". Seattle Post-Intelligencer.
- North, Bill (2003). ...to build up a rich collection...:Selected Works From the Marianna Kistler Beach Museum of Art. Marianna Kistler Beach Museum of Art. ISBN 1-890751-11-1.
- Paget, Mindie (2004-05-11). "A Sansei Story". Lawrence Journal-World. Archived from the original on 2007-09-30.
- Susan N. Platt (2004). "Racism is About All of Us". Raven Chronicles. Archived from the original on 2011-11-16.
- Emily Stamey, The Prints of Roger Shimomura A Catalogue Raisonné, 1968–2005 Archived 2012-10-10 at the Wayback Machine, University of Washington Press, 2007, ISBN 978-0-295-98672-2
