= Fay Chiang =

American poet (1952–2017)

- Born: January 27, 1952; The Bronx, New York
- Died: October 20, 2017

Fay Chiang (January 27, 1952 – October 20, 2017) was an American poet, writer, visual artist and activist based in New York City who was an advocate for introducing Chinese culture to American society.

== Personal life ==
Chiang was born in The Bronx in 1952. She grew up in Jackson Heights, Queens and later lived in New York City in the East Village. She died due to complications of cancer on October 20, 2017.

== Career ==
Chiang was the director of the Chinatown-based Asian American arts organization, Basement Workshop, in New York City from 1975 to 1986. Later, Chiang was active at the Henry Street Settlement on the Lower East Side, Project Reach, a program working with youth in New York City's Chinatown, and Poets and Writers. She was also involved in student-led protests advocating for better Asian American Studies courses at New York colleges.

Chiang's books of poetry include In The City of Contradictions, Miwa's Song, and 7 Continents, 9 Lives, published by Bowery Press. Her poetry focused on her identity as a Chinese-American, and explored the discrimination she faced through a lens of intersectionality.
