= Emily Cheng =

American painter

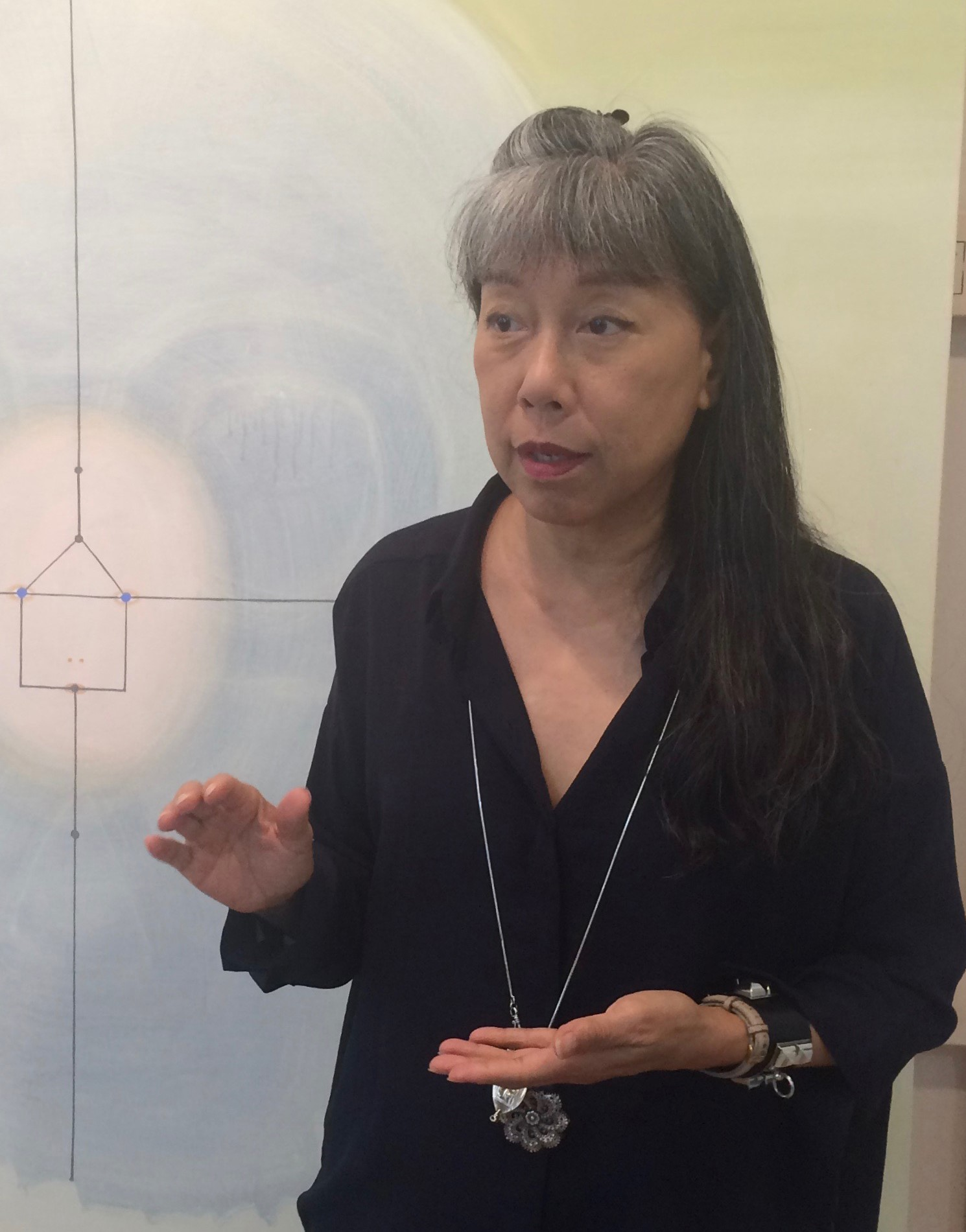
- Cheng in her studio
- Born: 28 July 1953; New York City, US
- Education: Rhode Island School of Design, New York Studio School
- Known for: Painting
- Website: www.emilycheng.com

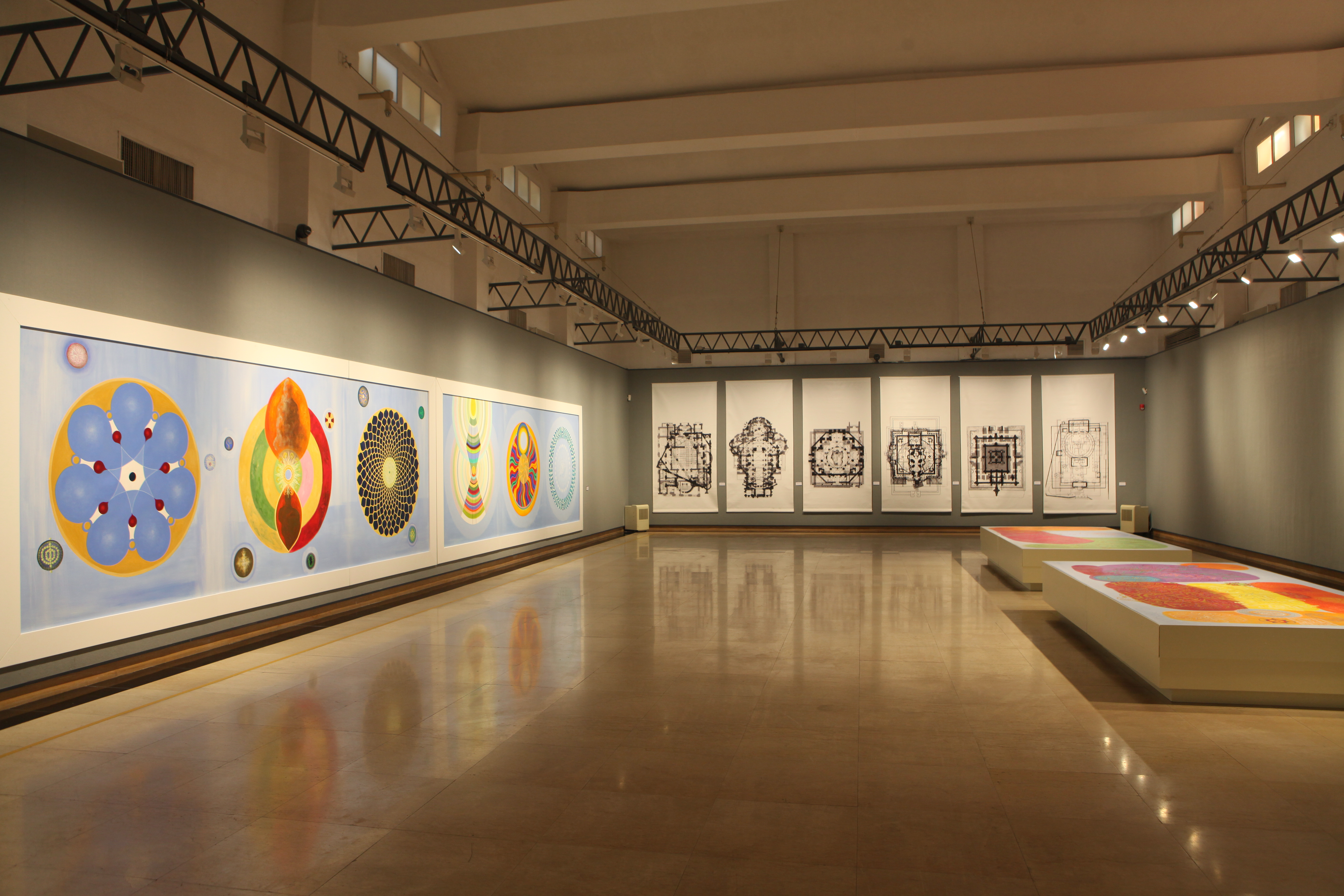
Emily Cheng, Installation Shenzhen Art Museum, 2015

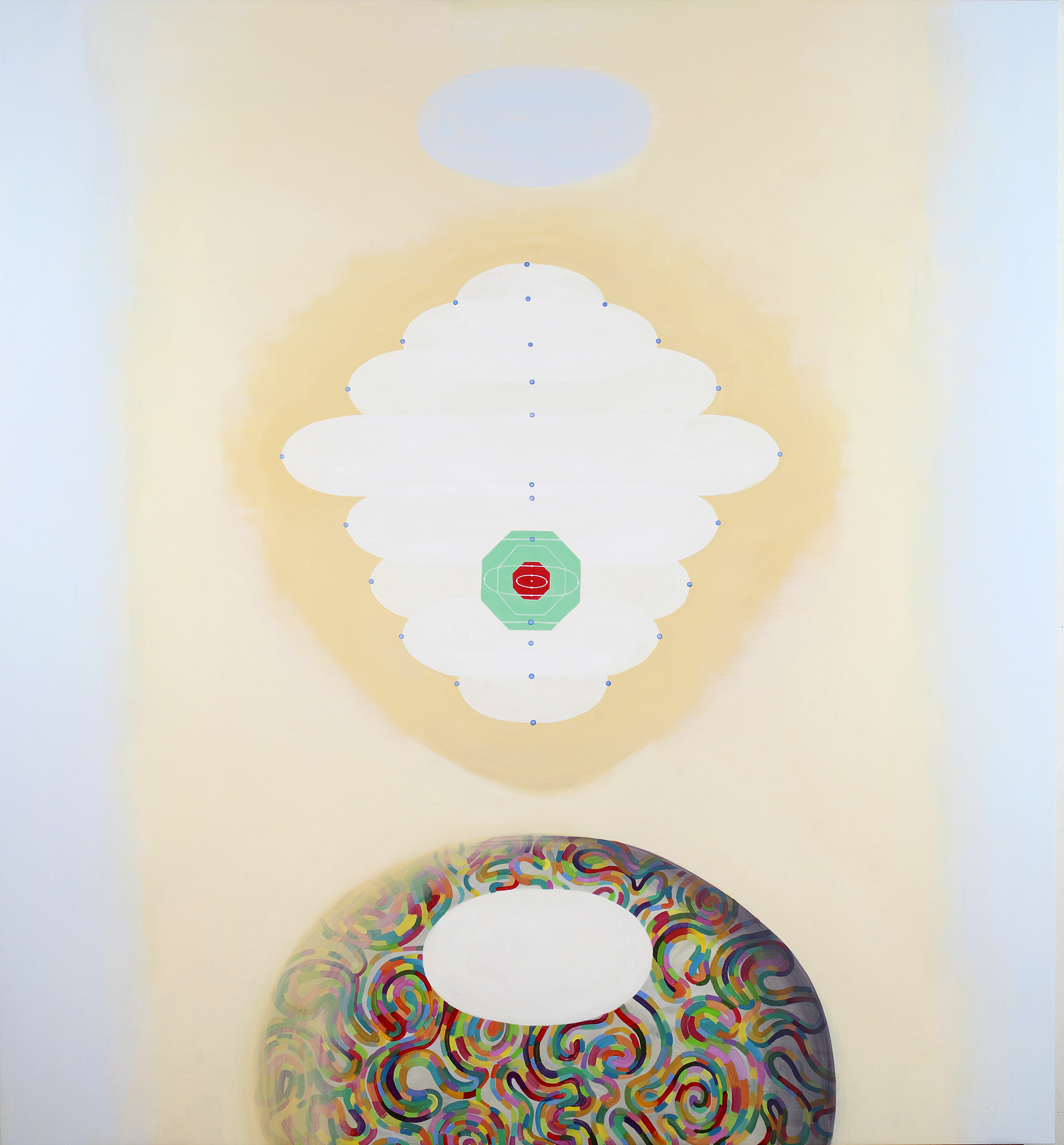
Emily Cheng, AboveBelowBagua, 2013

Emily Cheng (born 1953) is an American artist of Chinese ancestry. She is best known for large scale paintings with a center focus often employing expansive circular images... "radiantly colored, radially composed". She has won numerous awards including Pollock-Krasner Foundation Fellowship, 2010, New York Foundation for the Arts Fellowship, 1996, Yaddo Residency, 1995, National Endowment for the Arts Fellowship, 1982–1983.

Painting for me, is the evidence of an inquiry…It is the postulation made physical….It is the wall that penetrates….It is the mind reminded. It is the hunch made vivid. It is the reworking of the familiar. It is the shadow of the unfamiliar. It is the acting out of desire. It is the probe of limits. It is the life imaged. It is the eye engaged. Painting is luxury bounded.

Cheng received her BFA in 1975 from the Rhode Island School of Design and attended the New York Studio School. Cheng has exhibited widely in the US and in Asia. In 2011, Cheng created Charting Sacred Territories, an exhibition exploring world religions which opened in the Museum of Contemporary Art Taipei, Taiwan (2011) and traveled to Hanart TZ Gallery in (2015), Shenzhen Art Museum, Shenzhen, China, (2015) and in Europe at the Palais Liechtenstein Feldkirch, Austria (2019).

Cheng has had numerous solo shows in the US and in Asia and is represented by Hanart TZ Gallery in Hong Kong.

In 2007, Timezone 8 published a monograph of Emily Cheng titled, Chasing Clouds, a decade of studies, with essays by Kevin Powers and Johnson Chang

Emily Cheng has lived and worked in New York City since 1977 and teaches Asian Art History at the School of Visual Arts

== Selected solo exhibitions ==
- Ille Arts, Amagansett, New York, (2017, 2014)
- Shenzhen Art Museum, Shenzhen, China, (2015)
- Hanart T.Z. Gallery, Hong Kong, (2015, 2011, 1996)
- Zane Bennett Contemporary, Santa Fe, New Mexico, (2013)
- Museum of Contemporary Art Taipei, Taiwan (2011)
- Louis Vuitton Maison, Kowloon, Hong Kong, (2010)
- Ayala Museum Makati, Philippines, (2006)
- Plum Blossom Gallery, New York, NY, (2004)
- Schmidt/Dean Gallery, Philadelphia, PA (2002, 1992, 1990)
- Byron Cohen Gallery, Kansas City, MO (2001)
- Metropolitan Museum of Manila, Philippines (1997)
- John Post Lee Gallery, New York, NY, Projects Room (1997)
- Contemporary Arts Center, Cincinnati, Ohio, 1994
- David Beitzel Gallery, New York, NY, (1992)
- Lang & O'Hara Gallery, New York, NY, (1990, 1988, 1987)
- The Bronx Museum of the Arts, Bronx, NY, (1989)
- White Columns, New York, NY, (1985)

== Selected group exhibitions ==
- Art Basel Hong Kong, (Hanart Gallery), Hong Kong, 2017
- China Institute, New York, NY, 2014
- Beijing Art Fair, Beijing, China, 2013
- Museum of Chinese in America New York, NY, 2010
- Kidspace, MASS MoCA, Williamstown, MA, 2010, 2005
- Museum of Contemporary Art, Shanghai, China, 2009
- Guangzhou Triennial, Guangdong, China, 2009
- Museum of Art, Guangzhou, China, 2008
- Contrast Gallery, Shanghai and Beijing, China, 2008
- University of South Florida Contemporary Art Museum, Tampa, Florida, 2006
- Hong Kong Arts Centre, Hong Kong, 2004
- American Academy of Art, New York, New York, 2004
- Longmarch Project, Beijing, China, 2002
- Sotheby’s, New York, NY, 2001
- Newhouse Center, Snug Harbor Cultural Center, Staten Island, NY, 2000
- Katonah Museum of Art, Katonah, NY, 2000
- National Academy and Museum, NY, 2000
- Municipal Museum of Gyor, Hungary, 1999
- New Museum of Contemporary Art, New York, NY, 1998
- De Cordova Museum and the Computer Museum, Boston, MA, 1994
- International Graphic Biennial, Muveszeti Museum, Hungary, 1995
- Yerba Buena Center for the Arts, San Francisco, CA, 1994
- Drawing Center, NY; traveled to Corcoran, Washington D.C., Santa Monica Museum of Art, Santa Monica CA; The Contemporary Art Museum St. Louis, St. Louis MO; American Center, Paris, France, 1993
- Cone Editions Gallery, New York 1990
- Anina Nosei Gallery, New York, 1988
- Greenville County Museum of Art, South Carolina, 1988
- North Carolina Museum of Art, North Carolina, 1988
- Hallwalls, Buffalo, NY, 1988
- Grace Borgenicht Gallery, New York, 1986
- Tibor de Nagy, New York, 1985
- Asian American Arts Centre, New York, 1985

== Awards ==
- Pollock-Krasner Foundation Fellowship, 2010
- New York Foundation for the Arts Fellowship, 1996
- Yaddo Residency, 1995
- National Endowment for the Arts Fellowship, 1982-1983

== Bibliography ==
- Books by Emily Cheng include Emily Cheng: Chasing Clouds: A Decade of Studies - Publisher: Blue Kingfisher; n edition (March 1, 2008) ISBN 9889961768
- The Figure: Another Side of Modernism – Publisher: Snug Haror Cultural Center SHCC; Et Al (2000) ISBN 096042542X
