= Tseng Kwong Chi =

American photographer, born in Hong Kong

- Disneyland, California, from the series East Meets West (1979) at the Smithsonian American Art Museum in 2023
- Born: Joseph Tseng; September 6, 1950; British Hong Kong
- Died: March 10, 1990 (aged 39); Manhattan, New York City, United States
- Occupation: Photographer
- Years active: 1979–1989
- Notable work: East Meets West
- Website: tsengkwongchi.com

Tseng Kwong Chi (Chinese: 曾廣智; September 6, 1950 – March 10, 1990), born Joseph Tseng, was a Hong Kong-born American photographer associated with the East Village art scene in New York City during the 1980s. He was the brother of dancer and choreographer Muna Tseng.

== Work ==
Tseng was part of a circle of artists in the 1980s New York art scene including Keith Haring, Kenny Scharf and Cindy Sherman.

Tseng's most famous body of work is his more than 100 self-portrait series, East Meets West, also called the "Expeditionary Series". In the series, Tseng dressed in what he called his "Mao suit" (also called a Zhongshan suit) and sunglasses (dubbed a "wickedly surrealistic persona" by The New York Times) and photographed himself situated, often emotionlessly, in front of iconic tourist sites. Tseng was inspired when he was treated as a VIP while dining with his family at Windows on the World, a restaurant atop World Trade Center.

The first photograph was taken in Provincetown, Massachusetts; other sites included the Statue of Liberty, the United States Capitol; Cape Canaveral, Disneyland, and Notre-Dame de Paris.

Tseng also took over 40,000 photographs of New York graffiti artist Keith Haring throughout the 1980s working on murals, installations and the subway. In 1984, his photographs were shown with Haring's work at the opening of the Semaphore Gallery East location in a show titled "Art in Transit". Tseng photographed the first Concorde landing at John F. Kennedy International Airport, on October 19, 1977, from the tarmac. According to his sister, Tseng drew artistic influence from Brassaï and Henri Cartier-Bresson.

Tseng's work is in the public collection of the Solomon R. Guggenheim Museum in New York and the San Francisco Museum of Modern Art in California. Tseng has also been included in the Asian American Arts Centre's digital archive. In 2025, the George Eastman Museum purchased Tseng's Moral Majority (1981) with funds from the Horace W. Goldsmith Foundation.

== Life ==
Tseng's father was a Kuomintang officer who fled Shanghai in 1949 when the Communists won the Chinese Civil War. Tseng was born in British Hong Kong the following year and was a child prodigy in Chinese painting and calligraphy. He was educated at St Joseph's College before his parents moved the family to Canada when he was 16. He originally studied painting at Académie Julian in Paris, but switched to photography after one year, having gained an interest photography after his father gave him a Rolleiflex camera. He moved to Manhattan's East Village in 1979, where he soon met fellow avant-garde artists Haring, Scharf, Jean-Michel Basquiat, and Ann Magnuson.

Tseng started documenting Haring's work through photograph in 1979, travelling with him from 1982-1989, expanding his own East Meets West series.

Tseng died of AIDS-related illness in 1990, and was survived by his companion of seven years, Robert-Kristoffer Haynes, who remains a resident of New York City and serves as Registrar at Paula Cooper Gallery.

== Books ==
- Chi, Tseng Kwong & Richard Martin, Tseng Kwong Chi (Kyoto Shoin International Co., Ltd / Art Random, Kyoto, Japan, 1990)
- Tseng Kwong Chi, Ambiguous Ambassador (Nazraeli Press, 2005)
- Cameron, Dan & Wei, Lily, Tseng Kwong Chi: Self Portraits 1979-1989 (Ben Brown Fine Arts & Paul Kasmin Gallery, 2008)
- Kwong Chi Tseng, Tseng Kwong Chi, Citizen of the World (Ben Brown Fine Arts Hong Kong, 2014)
- Chi, Tseng Kwong, Amy Brandt, Alexandra Chang, Lynn Gumpert, Joshua Takano Chambers-Letson, Muna Tseng, Tseng Kwong Chi: Performing For the Camera (Chrysler Museum of Art, Grey Art Gallery, New York University in association with Lyons Artbooks, 2015)
