= Sachiyo Ito =

Japanese artist

- 伊藤さちよ
- Born: 1949 (age 76–77); Tokyo
- Years active: 1972–date
- Known for: Japanese dance
- Website: http://dancejapan.com

Sachiyo Ito (伊藤さちよ; born 1949) is an artist and choreographer of classical, traditional, and contemporary Japanese dance. She is an arts educator in the United States since 1972.

== Career ==
Ito's professional debut was at the American Dance Festival held at Connecticut College in June 1972 where she gave a kabuki dance performance and offered a workshop. That fall, she began her Master of Arts degree in dance at NYU’s School of Education. Soon after, she began working for Japan House, now called Japan Society, to introduce the arts and culture of Japan into the New York City Tri-State area public schools. In the 1980s to 1990s, she performed for Asia Society’s education department, and from 1999 to 2000 she was a touring artist for Lincoln Center Institute for the Arts in Education.

Her New York debut in 1974 was at Japan House where she has offered a variety of performances and programs. Under the sponsorship of Asia Society in the mid-1980s, she performed throughout the United States and Canada where her performances were identified as the "Rocky's Kabuki."

From 1970 to 1980, she was invited to perform on tour throughout the United States with the All Nations Dance Company based at International House in New York City. Outside the USA, she has performed and offered workshops at Dublin Theatre Festival in Ireland (1979), Bonn International Dance Workshop in Germany (1983), and Congreso Mundial in Spain (2009). Her tour to South America in 2005 was sponsored by the Japan Foundation.

Her performance credits include Japan Society (1974, 1979, 1980), New York City Center (1980), the Theater of the Open Eye (1981), Asia Society (1981, 1983, 1984), Riverside Church (1982, 1984, 1986), the Kennedy Center in Washington, D.C. (2006), and Waves of Tradition at the Brooksfield World Trade Center Rotunda (2017). Performances at Lincoln Center in New York include Performing Arts Library (1995, 1996, 2005), Allice Tully Hall (1999), Clark Studio Theatre (1999), Portraits in Dramatic Time (2011), and Meet the Artists (2014). Ito also performed at numerous museums throughout the United States, including the Boston Museum of Fine Arts (1981), the Metropolitan Museum of Art (2003), the Philadelphia Museum of Art (1979, 2004), and the Museum of the City of New York (2010).

In addition to her performing career, Ito has served as a visiting professor at colleges, and universities and gave workshops at numerous schools and cultural institutions. She also offered courses at several American colleges and universities including The Juilliard School and New York University, where she served as Adjunct Professor the 1970s to the 1980s.

== Sachiyo Ito and Company ==
In 1981, Ito founded Sachiyo Ito and Company, a performing dance company and school of classical, traditional, and contemporary Japanese dance that also offers workshops, lecture demonstrations, and other educational and public events on Japanese dance and culture.

The company has performed for many festivals, including the Japanese festivals in Missouri Botanical Garden (1985, 2014), and cherry blossom festivals such as Sakura Matsuri at Brooklyn Botanic Garden since 1981, The Cherry Blossom Festival in Philadelphia in 2002 and 2003, Bloomfest at Branch Brook Park, Newark, NJ since 2015, and National Cherry Blossom Festival in Washington, D.C. in 2019, 2022, and 2023.

The 25th Anniversary concert (1997) of Ito's debut in USA was the Company's first home season concert to receive recognition for cultural exchange by the Japanese Ambassador of New York. Subsequent benchmark performances, such as the 50th Anniversary Concert of Ito's Japan debut and 30th anniversary of Sachiyo Ito and Company were supported by the Consulate General of Japan in New York.

From 1998 to 2023 the Company presented its Salon Series, an ongoing program of performances and lecture-demonstrations that introduced, and explored various aspects of Japanese performing arts and culture. Held three times a year, it was a forum for dialogue, and exchange between audiences, and world-class guest artists.

== Awards and commemorations ==
In 2008, Sachiyo Ito received the Foreign Minister's Award from the Japanese Foreign Ministry in recognition of her work in introducing the arts and culture of Japan to the United States, and for fostering a good-will friendship between the countries.

In 2011, Ito received a Proclamation from the Mayor of New York City commemorating 30 years since the founding of Sachiyo Ito and Company non-profit organization.

== Reception ==
Numerous articles have been written about Ito's choreography and dance performances.

BK Reader

- Japanese Dancers Bring Extra Color to BK’s Blooming Botanic Garden. April 19, 2021.

New York Times

- Now Resurfacing, the Myth of the Serpent Scorned. May 27, 2013.
- Dance Review: Peace Quest, Personal and Global. December 14, 1999.
- The Dance: Sachiyo Ito, with a bow to the past. October 4, 1986.
- World Tour of Dance at Home. October 15, 1982.
- Dance: Sachiyo Ito Presents Classics at Japan House. February 22, 1980.
- The Theater: ‘And the Soul Shall Dance.' June 30, 1979.
- Dance: Mythology of the Japanese. January 19, 1979.
- Control and Grace in Miss Ito’s Dance. April 19, 1974.

The Trinity Tripod

- Dancer Breathes Delicacy, Exquisite Movement into Oriental Dance Form. March 9, 1983.

== Publications ==
- “Japanese Expressions as They Appear in Dance,” Dance Research Journal, vol. X. CORD, NY, 1979.
- Origins of Traditional Okinawan Dance, Ph.D. Dissertation, UMI, 1988.
- “Origins of Traditional Okinawan Dance” Choreologia, Japanese Society for Dance Research, Tokyo, 1988.
- “Geisha Dance” and “Okinawan Dance,” International Encyclopedia of Dance, Oxford University Press, NY, 1998.
