= Changing Worlds =

- Location: Chicago, IL 60616
- Website: http://www.changingworlds.org

Changing Worlds is an educational arts nonprofit organization running oral history, writing and art programs.

== History ==
Changing Worlds began in 1996 at Hibbard Elementary School, a Chicago Public School located in the diverse, predominantly immigrant Albany Park neighborhood. Its founder Kay Berkson partnered with the school's staff and parents to create an oral history and photography exhibit. Now occupying three corridors of the school, the exhibit highlights fourteen family stories along with photographs, art work and maps. These stories told by students, their parents and grandparents are translated into twelve different languages. The project led to the development of an activity guide with ongoing family programs and classroom curricula that foster an inclusive school community. In 1999 a traveling version of the exhibit was created. The Changing Worlds project became an independent 501c3 nonprofit organization in 2000.

== Areas of focus ==
- School partnership programs
- Professional development institutes and workshops for teachers
- Community outreach programs (such as Ten Thousand Ripples)
- Traveling exhibitions
