= Tara Sabharwal =

Indian painter and printer

- Born: 1957 (age 68–69); Delhi, India
- Known for: Painter, printer

Tara Sabharwal (born 1957, New Delhi) is an Indian-born, US-based painter and printmaker. Known for her colorful, subtly layered paintings, Sabharwal has had 42 solo shows in the UK, US, India, among others. She has received several awards, including the Joan Mitchell CALL (Creating a Living Legacy), The British Council Scholarship, and a Gottlieb Foundation award. Her work is in the collection of The British Museum, Victoria and Albert Museum, and the Peabody Essex Museum among others.

== Education and career ==
Sabharwal studied painting at M.S University (Baroda, India) from 1975 to 1980, and received her master's degree at the Royal College of Art (London, UK) from 1982 to 1984. She returned to India from 1985 to 1988 and had shows in Delhi, Mumbai and London. From 1988 to 1990, she returned to the UK for fellowships, teaching and solo shows. In 1990 Sabharwal visited New York and settled there, while continuing to work and show in the UK and India. She has taught at the Guggenheim museum, Rubin museum, CUNY, Studio in a school, and The Cooper Union in New York City.

== Selected exhibitions ==
- An Ocean of Galaxies, Aidron Duckworth Museum, New Hampshire, (2019)
- Float, Wilmer Jennings gallery, New York (2018)
- The Open Window, Art Alive Gallery, New Delhi (2017)
- A PARTners, Gertrude Herbert Institute of Art, Georgia US (2017)
- In Other Rooms, Art Alive Gallery, New Delhi (2013)
- Such Different Paths, Galerie Martina Janzen, Düsseldorf (2010)
- Light and the Labrynth, Center for International Cultural exchange, Katsuyama, Japan (2008)
- Life Journeys, V.M. gallery, Karachi, (2007)
- The Dream of Waking Consciousness, Art Heritage Gallery New Delhi (2005)
- Wandering, Michael Oess Galerie, Konstanz, Germany (2003)
- Gentle Shade, Rebecca Hossack Gallery, (London) (1994)
- Visions, Laing Art Gallery, (Newcastle UK) (1990)
- Recent Works, Art Heritage Gallery New Delhi

== Selected awards ==
- 1982 British Council Scholarship and travel grants (London, UK).
- 1988 Myles Meehan fellowship (Darlington, UK)
- 1989 Durham Cathedral fellowship (Durham, UK).
- 2015 CALL, (Creating a Living legacy award) Joan Mitchell foundation, (NYC, USA)
- 2016 Individual support grant, Gottlieb Foundation (NYC, US).
- 2017 Artist in Residence, Atelierhaus Beisinghoff (Kassel, Germany)
- 2018 Belt and Road Project, Guanlan printmaking base, (Shinzhen, China)
- 2019 Visiting Artist Vermont Studio Center, (Virginia, USA)
- 2019 Residency, MassMoca, (MA, USA)

== Selected collections ==
- MONA, Museum of Nebraska Art (NE, USA)
- The British Museum (London, UK)
- The New York Public library (NYC, USA)
- Victoria and Albert Museum (UK, USA)
- Peabody Essex Museum (MA, USA)
- Library of Congress (D.C, USA)

== Videos ==
- Another Kind of Space, Women's Studio Workshop, 2018
- VoCa Talk, Voices of Contemporary Art, NYC, Nov 2017 at Fales Library, NYU.
- From Hishio: Tara Sabharwal, Artist Residency at Center for International Cultural Exchange, HISHIO, Japan, video by Tom Dean, 2008
