= Henry Chang =

American writer

- Born: New York City, U.S.
- Occupation: Author
- Writing career
- Genre: Detective fiction
- Website: www.chinatowntrilogy.com/index.htm

Henry Chang is an American detective story author from New York City. Born and raised in Chinatown, Chang bases his Detective Jack Yu Series primarily in this setting, and his objective "insider's" view influences the development of his stories' settings. His series focuses on the violence and poverty in Chinatown which he witnessed as he grew up. He is a graduate of CCNY. He began writing his first novel whilst working as a director of security for the Trump Organization.

In 2011, Chang was honored by Hamilton Madison House, an organization for improving impoverished areas of Manhattan, for his literary contributions to historic Chinatown. He has been featured at the Asian American Literary Festival and has done readings in collaboration with the New Museum's Festival of Ideas for the New City and the Museum of Chinese in America. He lives in Chinatown, Manhattan.

== Publications ==
- Chinatown Beat, Book 1 in the Detective Yu Series 2006, Soho Crime, ISBN 978-1-56947-478-5
- Year of the Dog, Book 2 in the Detective Yu Series 2007, Soho Crime, ISBN 978-1-56947-515-7
- Red Jade, Book 3 in the Detective Yu Series 2011, Soho Crime, ISBN 978-1-56947-997-1
- Death Money, Book 4 in the Detective Yu Series 2014, Soho Crime, ISBN 978-161695-351-5
- Lucky, Book 5 in the Detective Yu Series 2017, Soho Crime, ISBN 978-1-61695-784-1
