= Danny Yung =

Hong Kong artist (born 1943)

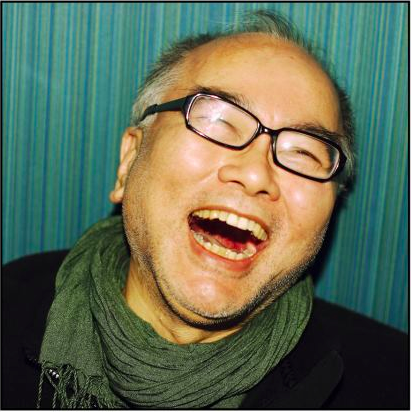
- Danny Yung
- Born: November 21, 1943 (age 82); Shanghai, China
- Education: University of California, Berkeley Columbia University
- Known for: Arts, Experimental Filmmaking
- Notable work: Tears of Barren Hill (2008) Stage Sisters (2010)

Danny Ning Tsun Yung (Chinese: 榮念曾) (born November 21, 1943) is a Hong Kong artist, cultural worker, experimental filmmaker, producer, choreographer, mathematician, and urban planner. He is widely recognized as an experimental art pioneer and one of the most influential artists in Hong Kong. He currently serves as chair of the Hong Kong Institute for Contemporary Culture, as well as a part-time member of Central Policy Unit, a Hong Kong government think tank. He is a co-founder of The Basement Workshop, an Asian American political and arts organization for writers, visual artists, dancers, and activists.

== Early life and education ==
Yung was born on 21 November 1943 in Shanghai, China, relocated to Hong Kong with his family at the age of five, and then moved to the United States at the age of 17, and spent 18 years of his life there. He studied Mathematics at Pacific University, Forest Grove, Oregon and studied dance under Lila Hitchcock, a direct student of Martha Graham, at the University. He further studied Architecture at University of California, Berkeley in 1967 and completed his Master's Degree on Urban Design and Urban Planning at Columbia University in 1969.

== Career ==
In 1979, Yung returned to Hong Kong and held his first one-man cartoon exhibition. He became involved in all aspects of the arts, including experimental films, cartoons, conceptual art, installation, video and performing arts. He formed the avant-garde arts collective Zuni Icosahedron in 1982 and has served as Artistic Director of Zuni since 1985.

In 1971, Danny Yung, Eleanor Yung, Peter Pan, Frank Ching and Rocky Chin established The Basement Workshop in New York City, NY which was the first Asian American arts and cultural organization on the East Coast. Funded by the Ford Foundation, Basement Workshop was an outgrowth of the research and data compiled for the Chinatown Report 1969.
