= Martin Wong =

American painter

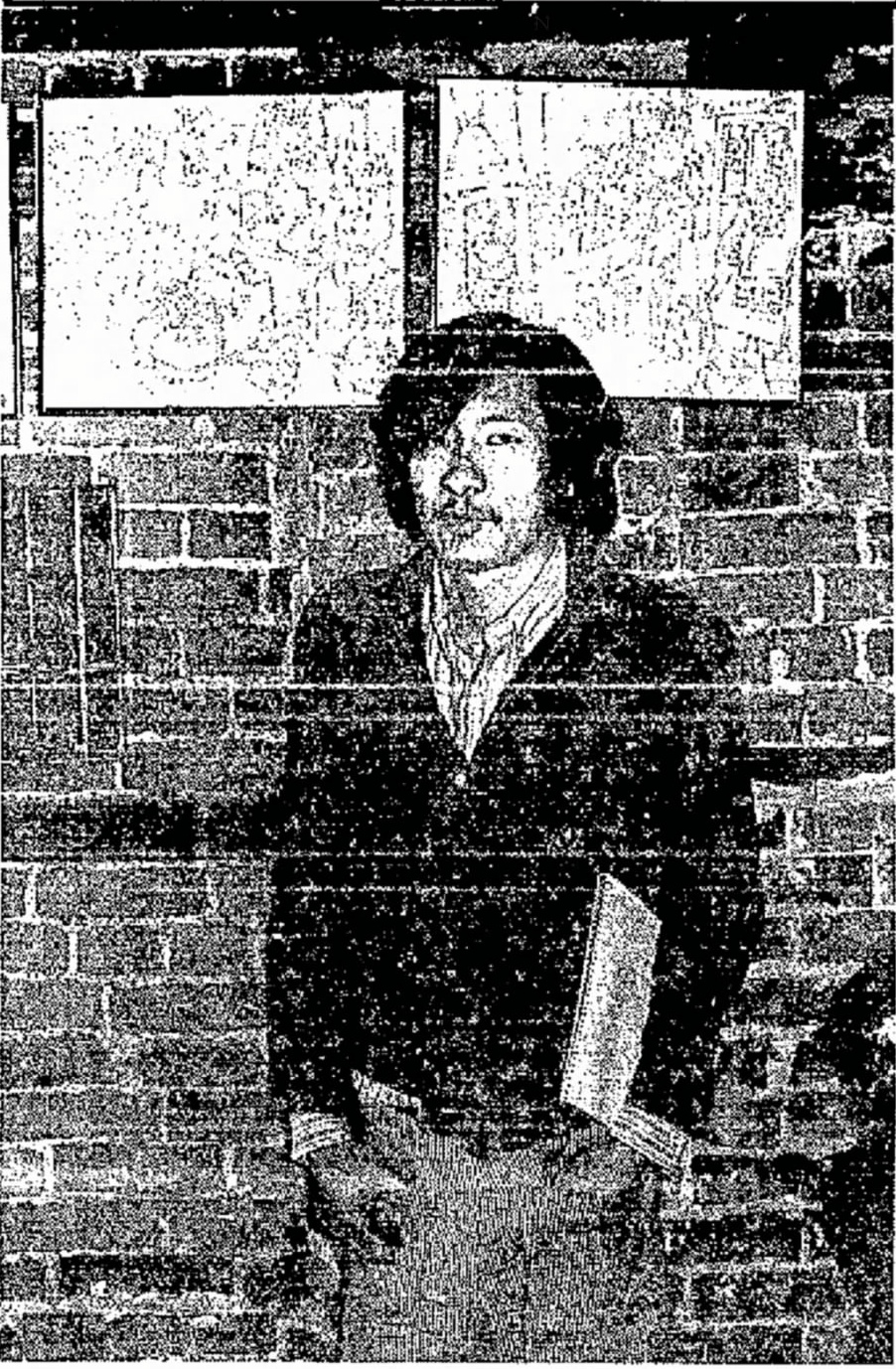
- Wong in 1977 in Eureka, California
- Born: July 11, 1946; Portland, Oregon, United States
- Died: August 12, 1999 (aged 53); San Francisco, California, United States
- Known for: Painting, drawing, sculpture, printmaking, ceramics

Martin Wong (Chinese: 黃馬鼎; July 11, 1946 – August 12, 1999) was an American artist and poet. Born to Chinese American parents in Oregon, Wong was raised in San Francisco by his mother and stepfather before studying art at university and becoming an active participant in the hippie counterculture in northern California. He began his career as a ceramist and eventually expanded his work to include poetry, sculpture, and, principally, painting. After living and working in California for nearly a decade following university, Wong moved to New York in 1978 and became well-known for his paintings depicting Manhattan's East Village and Lower East Side neighborhoods.

His work has been described as a meticulous blend of social realism and visionary art styles. Wong's paintings often explored multiple ethnic and racial identities, exhibited cross-cultural elements, demonstrated multilingualism, and celebrated his queer sexuality. He exhibited for two decades at notable New York galleries including EXIT ART, Semaphore, and P.P.O.W., among others, before his death in San Francisco from an AIDS-related illness. P.P.O.W. continues to represent his estate.

== Early life and education ==
Martin Wong was born in Portland, Oregon, on July 11, 1946, the only child of Florence (born Jan Yuet Ah) and Anthony Victor Wong. Florence, also born in Portland, was the daughter of a jewelry store owner from Guangzhou, and was raised in the Chinese city following her birth before returning to Oregon in 1940 to avoid the Japanese occupation. She moved to San Francisco, eventually securing work as a draftsperson at the Richmond Shipyards where she met Anthony, a Chinese-born draftsperson working in the facility. They married shortly before Wong was conceived, but Anthony was diagnosed with tuberculosis during the pregnancy. He died in 1950 in a sanatorium.

After Anthony's death, Wong was placed in foster care until his mother was able to find new employment as a draftsperson with Bechtel. Wong was raised by his mother for the first several years of his life, living in San Francisco's Chinatown. His aunt, Eleanor "Nora" Wong, had been an active participant in the Chinese nightclub scene in the neighborhood in the 1940s, most notably as principal singer at Forbidden City. In 1955, when Wong was nine years old, Florence married Benjamin Wong Fie, the co-owner of the apartment the family was renting. Fie was the son of a Chinese immigrant and Mexican immigrant, though Wong did not grow up speaking Chinese at home and did not become literate in the language. The family soon moved to a larger house between the Richmond and Haight-Ashbury neighborhoods after Benjamin was hired by Bechtel.

Demonstrating a proclivity for artistic expression at an early age, Wong started to paint at the age of 13. His mother was a strong supporter of his artistic inclinations and kept much of his early work. Wong took art classes through the De Young Museum's youth art program while attending George Washington High School. He first exhibited his art in 1961, showing a landscape painting at a gallery in North Beach. His mother also encouraged Wong to collect art and artifacts and he quickly amassed a large collection of primarily Asian art. He graduated high school in 1964.

Wong continued his education at Humboldt State University in Arcata, California, for two years, before transferring to the University of California, Berkeley in 1966 to study architecture. Living in San Francisco, he became an active participant in the city's hippie counterculture. He experimented with psychedelic drugs and was arrested at an anti-draft protest in Oakland during this period. In 1967, during the Summer of Love, he was arrested at a cannabis party in Haight-Ashbury and his mugshot was published in the San Francisco Examiner. At the end of the year, he was briefly hospitalized for inpatient psychiatric treatment, being released early in 1968.

Wong returned to Humboldt State in 1968, where he took classes in every artistic discipline available to learn more about multiple mediums, though he ultimately focused on ceramics. His ceramics from this period were primarily abstract sculptures reminiscent of Buddhist and Hindu symbols and geometries, often with rough edges, tines, and spike-like elements. As an undergraduate, Wong also began producing an extensive amount of poetry. He completed his first major poem, "Firefly Evening", and self-published his first book of poems, Footprints, Poems + Leaves, in 1968. "Firefly Evening" was produced as a hand-drawn calligraphic scroll with a distinct style of text he developed after taking a course on Western calligraphy. He also created several poems executed as inscribed ceramic tablets. Wong graduated with a bachelor's degree in ceramics from Humboldt State in 1970 and moved back to San Francisco.

== Life and career ==
=== 1970–1979: San Francisco and Eureka, early art, move to New York ===
After returning to San Francisco following graduation, Wong enrolled in graduate studies in ceramics at Mills College and became involved in the Bay Area art scene. He traveled in 1971 on the so-called hippie trail from Europe to South Asia, visiting and studying with artisans and artists across the route, including in Afghanistan and the southern Himalayas. Back in California, he worked extensively as a set designer for the performance art and theater group The Angels of Light, an offshoot of the queer performance group The Cockettes. The Angels of Light split from the original group after The Cockettes began charging for performances, leading to disagreements over the group's politics and philosophy. Wong first joined the group after returning from his international travel and deciding to quit making ceramics in 1971, having had his work rejected from a juried exhibition at the de Young Museum because he used glitter in the submitted works. He dropped out of his graduate program around the same time, having become dissatisfied with the field of ceramics. Wong lived at the Angels's compound in the city several times during the early 1970s and became a key creative driver of the group's aesthetic through its elaborate set pieces, drawing on his study of Asian art and culture for inspiration. Another member of the Angels described Wong's participation in the group as a means for him to experiment with his sexuality and come out as a gay man.

In 1972, Wong built and painted the sets for two Angels productions, In Allah Mode, or Chained to the Subculture and Peking on Acid. He traveled with the group to Oregon late in the year to stage a version of Peking on Acid, a physically demanding undertaking, and he was hospitalized after experiencing psychosis related to the stress. Upon being released, he moved to Eureka, California, near his alma mater, to live in a quieter community. In Eureka, a mainly working class city, Wong quickly integrated himself into the community. He illustrated menus and stationary for local businesses, worked as a courtroom sketch artist, and designed the album cover for a local band. He continued to travel back to San Francisco to work with the Angels and other friends and colleagues in the city after moving to Eureka. Wong was again hospitalized in 1974 for psychiatric treatment after walking into traffic in San Francisco.

By the late 70s, Wong made the decision to move to New York to pursue his career as an artist. According to Wong, his move to New York was precipitated by a friendly challenge:

I made ceramics and did drawings at arts fairs. I was known as the 'Human Instamatic.' It was US$7.50 for a portrait. My record was 27 fairs in one day. Friends said to me, 'If you're so good, why don't you go to New York?'

In 1978 Wong moved to Manhattan, settling on the Lower East Side, where his attention turned exclusively to painting. Largely self-taught, Wong's paintings ranged from gritty renderings of the decaying Lower East Side to playful depictions of New York's and San Francisco's Chinatowns, to Traffic Signs for the Hearing Impaired. In self-describing the subject matter of some of his paintings, Wong said: "Everything I paint is within four blocks of where I live and the people are the people I know and see all the time."

=== 1980–1989: Depicting downtown Manhattan, collaboration with Piñero, gallery shows, street art collecting ===
Wong is perhaps best known for his collaborations with Nuyorican poet Miguel Piñero. He met Piñero in 1982 on the opening night of the group exhibition Crime Show, held at ABC No Rio. Shortly after meeting, Piñero moved into Wong's apartment where he lived for the next year and a half. Wong credited Piñero with enabling him to feel more integrated into the Latino community. While they lived together, Wong produced a significant body of work that he eventually displayed in his exhibition Urban Landscapes at Barry Blinderman's Semaphore Gallery in 1984. Their collaborative paintings often combined Piñero's poetry or prose with Wong's painstaking cityscapes and stylized fingerspelling. Wong's Loisaida pieces and collaborations with Piñero formed part of the Nuyorican arts movement. Wong was openly gay, and he and Piñero were romantic as well as artistic partners.

Attorney Street (Handball Court with Autobiographical Poem by Piñero) (1982-1984) at the Metropolitan Museum of Art

While living with Wong, Piñero commissioned him to document via painting a recently created graffiti work by the artist Little Ivan, which resulted in Wong beginning his Loisaida series. Wong's painting, Attorney Street (Handball Court with Autobiographical Poem by Piñero), centered on the graffiti work but also included a poem by Piñero, spelled out using hands in American Sign Language in the foreground of the image and written in English in the background against the sky. Wong also painted additional phrases on the frame of the painting using hands and sign language, painted to appear carved into the wood. Curator Sofie Krogh Christensen called this work a "eulogy to the multilingual community of the Lower East Side and its protagonists" for its use of multiple perspectives through text - the graffiti art of Little Ivan, Piñero's poem, and Wong's own sign language message on the frame - to memorialize the rapidly changing neighborhood. Piñero died in 1988 from cirrhosis.

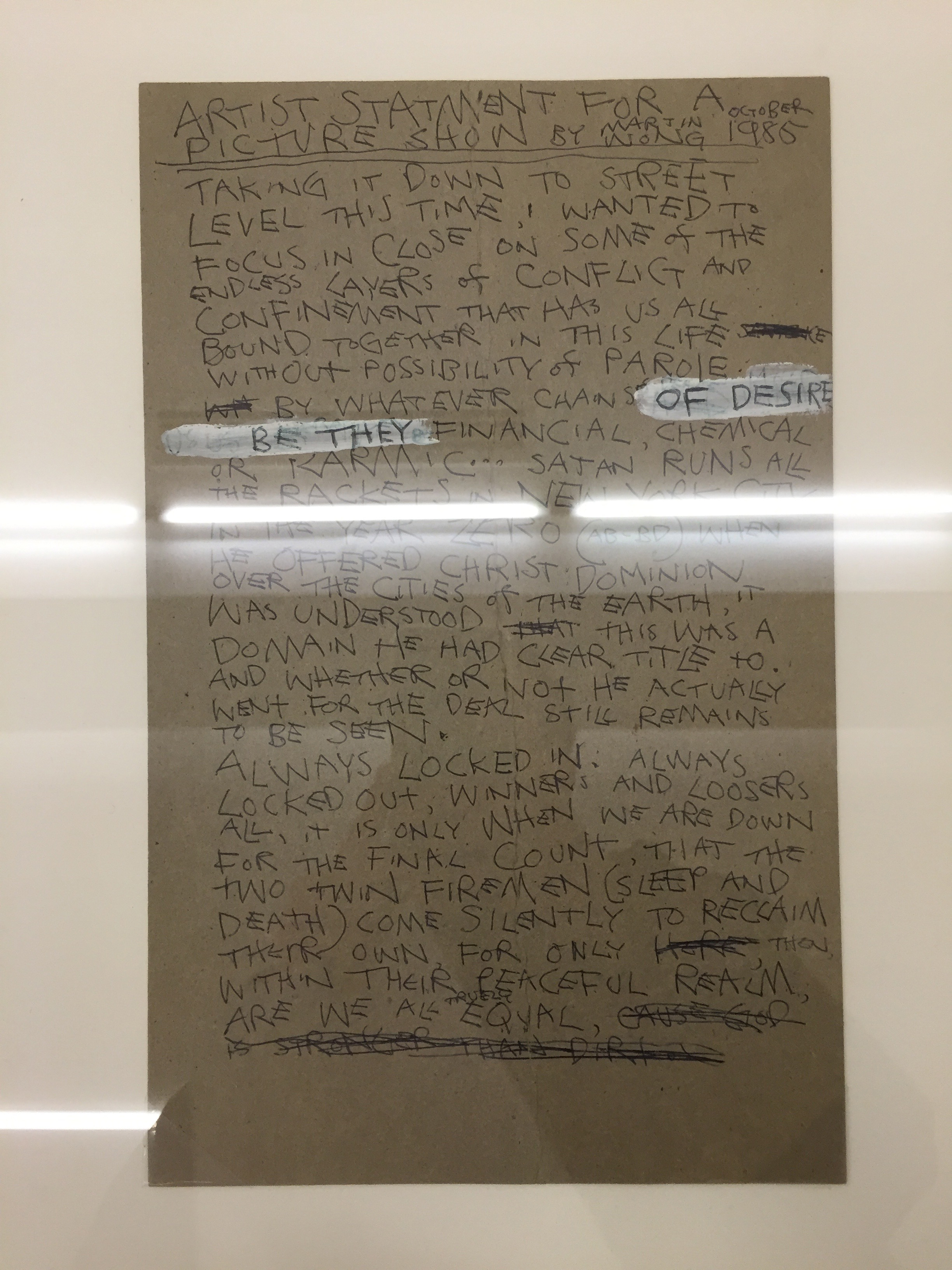
Wong's Artist Statement for Semaphore Gallery, 1984.

For a time in the 1980s, he made ends meet by buying underpriced antiquities at Christie's and selling them at Sotheby's for a fairer price. Wong amassed a sizable graffiti collection while living in New York and with the help of a Japanese investor, he co-founded with his friend Peter Broda the Museum of American Graffiti on Bond Street in the East Village in 1989. During this time, graffiti was a highly contested form of art and city officials had removed much of what had been in the New York City Subway system. In response, Wong set out to preserve what he considered to be "the last great art movement of the twentieth century."

=== 1990–1999: Depicting Chinatowns, move to San Francisco and health decline, final exhibitions ===
Wong held a solo exhibition titled Chinatown Paintings at the San Francisco Art Institute in 1993 that showcased his own memories, experiences and interpretations of the "mythical quality of Chinatown." Wong exemplified "a tourist idea, an outsider's view" of Chinatown that was prevalent for those distant from the reality of the city.

In 1994 Wong was diagnosed with AIDS. With his health in decline following the diagnosis, he moved back to San Francisco to live with his family. Before leaving New York, he donated his graffiti and street art collection to the Museum of the City of New York. Among his collection were pieces from 1980s New York-based street artists including Rammellzee, Jean-Michel Basquiat, Keith Haring, Futura 2000, Lady Pink, and Lee Quiñones.

In 1998, the Illinois State University Galleries and the New Museum in New York co-organized Wong's first retrospective exhibition, Sweet Oblivion: The Urban Landscape of Martin Wong, covering two decades of his work beginning with his arrival in New York. The exhibition included several of Wong's large paintings of buildings and landscapes in New York, along with a number of his sign language paintings.

Wong created only three new paintings in 1998 while living with his mother in San Francisco, all depicting cacti from her garden, rendered in stark black and white. He staged an exhibition of these new paintings and other recent works at P.P.O.W. in New York the same year.

Wong died under the care of his parents in their San Francisco home at the age of 53 from an AIDS related illness on August 12, 1999.

== Legacy and influence ==
Following his death, Wong was described in his obituary by Roberta Smith of The New York Times as an artist "whose meticulous visionary realism is among the lasting legacies of New York's East Village art scene of the 1980s."

In 1999 and 2000, Wong's mother as the executor of his estate donated the bulk of his papers and ephemera to New York University's Fales Library. The Martin Wong Papers, ranging from 1982 to 1999, comprise sketchbooks, correspondence, biographical documents, videocassette recordings, photographs, graffiti-related materials, and parts of Wong's personal library.

In 2001, Wong's mother founded the Martin Wong Foundation to help fund art programs and young artists through collegiate art scholarships, art publications and active art education programs. Since 2003, the scholarships have continued to be offered at Wong’s alma mater Humboldt State University, San Francisco State University, New York University, and Arizona State University.

=== Posthumous exhibitions ===
P.P.O.W. staged a posthumous exhibition in 2001 featuring nine of Wong's paintings from the 1980s of storefronts and building entrances in New York's Lower East Side and East Village. The gallery organized another exhibition of Wong's work in 2010, Martin Wong: Everything Must Go, curated by the artist Adam Putnam, including paintings, sketches, and photograph collages.

In 2015, the Wattis Institute for Contemporary Arts in San Francisco mounted a posthumous retrospective of Wong's work, Martin Wong: Painting is Forbidden, featuring over 150 artworks and ephemera, primarily small and early pieces. Also in 2015, the Bronx Museum of the Arts (Note: After closing in New York, the retrospective traveled to the Wexner Center for the Arts in Columbus, Ohio, and the Berkeley Art Museum and Pacific Film Archive in Berkeley, California. The exhibition was reviewed in ARTnews, The New Yorker, The New York Times, Hyperallergic, Time Out, The Brooklyn Rail, The Art Newspaper, frieze, Artforum, KQED, and SF Weekly.) in New York organized the first full traveling retrospective of Wong's work since his death, titled Martin Wong: Human Instamatic. P.P.O.W. hosted an exhibition in 2016 of Wong's written scrolls and other calligraphic works on paper, titled Voices.

In 2022, a touring retrospective of Wong's work, Martin Wong: Malicious Mischief, opened at the Centro de Arte Dos de Mayo (CA2M) in Madrid, (Note: After closing in Madrid, the retrospective traveled to the KW Institute for Contemporary Art in Berlin, the Camden Art Centre in London, and the Stedelijk Museum Amsterdam. The exhibition was reviewed in El Español, ABC, El País, Berliner Morgenpost, The Berliner, e-flux frieze, Art in America, Financial Times, Time Out, ArtReview, Studio International,, Texte zur Kunst, The Guardian, Flash Art, NRC, and Het Parool.) the artist's first retrospective in Europe. The same year, Galerie Buchholz in Berlin organized an exhibition of Wong's early works on paper from the 1960s and 1970s.

P.P.O.W. staged an exhibition in 2026 featuring Wong's paintings of the character Popeye made of red bricks, including several animatronic works. The mechanized paintings were built with components that made the Popeye figure rock back and forth. Also in 2026, The nonprofit gallery Wrightwood 659 in Chicago hosted Martin Wong: Chinatown USA, the artist's first solo exhibition in the city. The exhibition, a retrospective focused on Wong's paintings of Chinatowns in New York and San Francisco, featured several previously unseen works that the artist had not exhibited during his life.

== Notable works in public collections ==
- Silence (1982), Berkeley Art Museum and Pacific Film Archive, Berkeley, California
- Stanton near Forsyth Street (1983), Museum of Modern Art, New York
- Sweet Oblivion (1983), Art Institute of Chicago
- Attorney Street (Handball Court with Autobiographical Poem by Piñero) (1982-1984), Metropolitan Museum of Art, New York
- The Annunciation According to Mikey Piñero (Cupcake and Paco) (1984), Syracuse University Art Museum, Syracuse, New York
- It's Not What You Think, What Is It Then? (1984), Bronx Museum of the Arts, New York
- Narcolepsy (1985-1986), Grand Rapids Art Museum, Grand Rapids, Michigan
- Big Heat (1986), Whitney Museum, New York
- Rapture (1988), San Francisco Museum of Modern Art
- Sweet 'Enuff (1988), Fine Arts Museums of San Francisco
- Self-Portrait (1993), San Francisco Museum of Modern Art

== See also ==
- Julie Ault
- American Sign Language
- List of LGBT people from Portland, Oregon

== Notes, citations, and references ==
=== Cited references ===
- Ault, Julie (2015). "Martin Wong Was Here". In Bessa, Antonio Sergio (ed.). Martin Wong: Human Instamatic. New York; London: Bronx Museum of the Arts; Black Dog Publishing. pp. 83–97. ISBN 9781910433416. OCLC 902657561.
- Christensen, Sofie Krogh (2022). "A Cosmos of Codes: The Languages of Martin Wong". In Gruijthuijsen, Krist; Pérez Rubio, Agustín (eds.). Martin Wong: Malicious Mischief. Köln: Verlag der Buchhandlung Walther und Franz König. pp. 82–98. ISBN 978-3-7533-0340-6.
- Getsy, David J. (2022). "Bricks and Jails: On Martin Wong's Queer Fantasies". In Gruijthuijsen, Krist; Pérez Rubio, Agustín (eds.). Martin Wong: Malicious Mischief. Köln: Verlag der Buchhandlung Walther und Franz König. pp. 178–198. ISBN 978-3-7533-0340-6.
- Johnson, Mark Dean; Beadnell, Anneliis; Willis, Johnny (2026) [First published 2022 in Martin Wong Catalogue Raisonné, revised and expanded 2026]. "1946–99: Illustrated Narrative Chronology". In Nakamori, Yasufumi (ed.). Martin Wong: Chinatown USA. Chicago; New York: Halsted A&A Foundation; Gregory R. Miller & Co. pp. 177–191. ISBN 978-0-9800242-6-5. OCLC 1593460239.
- Johnson, Mark Dean (2026). "Martin Wong's Heterotopia". In Nakamori, Yasufumi (ed.). Martin Wong: Chinatown USA. Chicago; New York: Halsted A&A Foundation; Gregory R. Miller & Co. pp. 130–142. ISBN 978-0-9800242-6-5. OCLC 1593460239.
- Kwon, Marci (2022). "Glittering Visions: Martin Wong and the Queer Counterculture, 1966–1978". In Gruijthuijsen, Krist; Pérez Rubio, Agustín (eds.). Martin Wong: Malicious Mischief. Köln: Verlag der Buchhandlung Walther und Franz König. pp. 48–64. ISBN 978-3-7533-0340-6.
- Li, Vivian (2026). "Reading Martin Wong". In Nakamori, Yasufumi (ed.). Martin Wong: Chinatown USA. Chicago; New York: Halsted A&A Foundation; Gregory R. Miller & Co. pp. 112–120. ISBN 978-0-9800242-6-5. OCLC 1593460239.
- Mann, Richard G. (July 4, 2007). "Wong, Martin" (PDF). glbtq.com. Archived (PDF) from the original on July 15, 2024.
- Nakamori, Yasufumi (2026). "Introduction". In Nakamori, Yasufumi (ed.). Martin Wong: Chinatown USA. Chicago; New York: Halsted A&A Foundation; Gregory R. Miller & Co. pp. 5–8. ISBN 978-0-9800242-6-5. OCLC 1593460239.
- Nash, Steven (1995). Facing Eden: 100 Years of Landscape Art in the Bay Area. San Francisco: University of California Press. ISBN 978-0-520-20363-1.
- Pérez Rubio, Agustín (2022). "...it's not really what you think. Martin Wong and the Recreation of the Sociopolitical Landscape of Loisaida". In Gruijthuijsen, Krist; Pérez Rubio, Agustín (eds.). Martin Wong: Malicious Mischief. Köln: Verlag der Buchhandlung Walther und Franz König. pp. 130–156. ISBN 978-3-7533-0340-6.
- Schwabsky, Barry (September 1998). "A City of Bricks and Ciphers". Art in America. Vol. 86, no. 9. pp. 100–105.
- Yee, Lydia (2026). "Martin Wong: Constellations". In Nakamori, Yasufumi (ed.). Martin Wong: Chinatown USA. Chicago; New York: Halsted A&A Foundation; Gregory R. Miller & Co. pp. 72–76. ISBN 978-0-9800242-6-5. OCLC 1593460239.
