= Deena Burton =

American dancer

Deena Burton (September 23, 1948 – April 3, 2005) was an American dancer, specializing in the field of Javanese and Balinese dance. Burton was also the founder of Arts Indonesia. She was also instrumental in the creation of Artists Inspired by Asia and Artists Inspired by Indonesia, expositional festivals of Asian and Indonesian theater, music, and dance, respectively. She additionally was an adjunct faculty member at Eugene Lang College in New York, where she taught courses in Asian and World theater.
