= Sin Cha Hong =

South Korean dancer (born 1943)

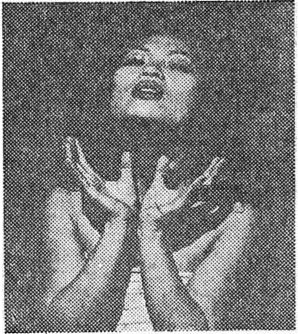
- Hong in c.1973, performing Jerye.

Korean name
- Hangul: 홍신자
- Hanja: 洪信子
- RR: Hong Sinja
- MR: Hong Sinja

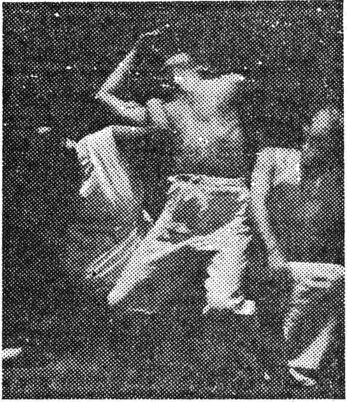
Hong in c.1973

Sin Cha Hong (Korean: 홍신자; born 1943) is a noted modern dancer, choreographer, vocalist, and writer from South Korea. She is acknowledged as South Korea's first avant-garde dancer, and has been credited as that nation's premier performance artist.

She lived and worked in the United States from the late 1960s until 1990, founding the Laughing Stone Dance Company (웃는돌 무용단) in New York City in 1981. She returned to live in South Korea in 1990. She also spent some time in India, which affected her dance practice. She has collaborated with the gayageum player Hwang Byungki. She also studied meditation for 30 years (which she first began doing in India), and is known as a meditation master.

In a 2002 interview, she mentioned that modern dance is becoming more popular in Korea. She mentioned how she had not always been interested in traditional Korean music and dance, but had become so. She also explained how she got the concept of a "laughing stone," which is in the name of her dance company. While meditating, she realized that everything has a spirit, and even a stone can be laughing or crying.
