= Lydia Okumura =

Brazilian artist (born 1948)

- Born: 1948; São Paulo, Brazil
- Known for: Sculpture
- Website: lydiaokumura.com

Lydia Okumura (born 1948) is a Brazilian artist known for her geometric abstractions.

== Biography ==
=== Early life and education ===
Okumura was born in 1948 in São Paulo. She studied at Fundação Armando Alvares Penteado, graduating in 1973.

In the 1970s she was part of a São Paulo art collective, "Equipe3". In 1973, Equipe3 participated in the São Paulo Bienal with the site-specific work Pontos de vista. Around that time Okumura moved to New York City to attended the Pratt Graphics Center. She has exhibited extensively since the 1970s.

=== Collections ===
Her work is included in the collections of the Pérez Art Museum Miami, Florida; Akron Art Museum, Ohio; the Hara Museum of Contemporary Art, Japan; and the Metropolitan Museum of Art, New York.

=== Exhibitions ===
Okumura's practice includes drawings, wall paintings and sculptural installations that play with spatial illusions using geometric abstraction. Okumura's first solo exhibition in the United States was in 2016 at the University at Buffalo. In 2019 she had a solo show at the Galerie Thaddaeus Ropac in London.

In 2024, Lydia Okumura's work was included in Every Sound is a Shape of Time a collections-based show at the Pérez Art Museum Miami showcasing an intergenerational group of artists working in a wide varied of media.

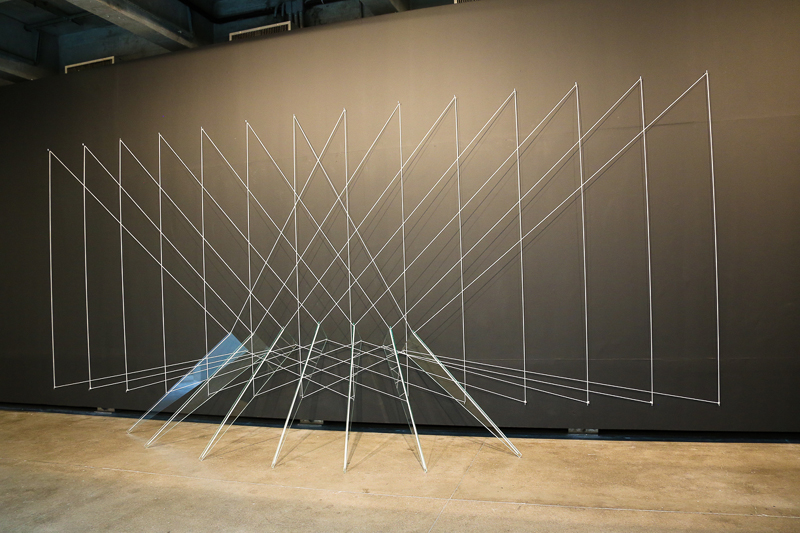
Lydia Okumura, Corda, Vidro e Prego (2017). Installation shot from the exhibition Pedra no céu - Arte e Arquitetura de Paulo Mendes da Rocha, Brazilian Museum of Sculpture, São Paulo
