= WhiteBox (art center) =

Art organization located in New York City

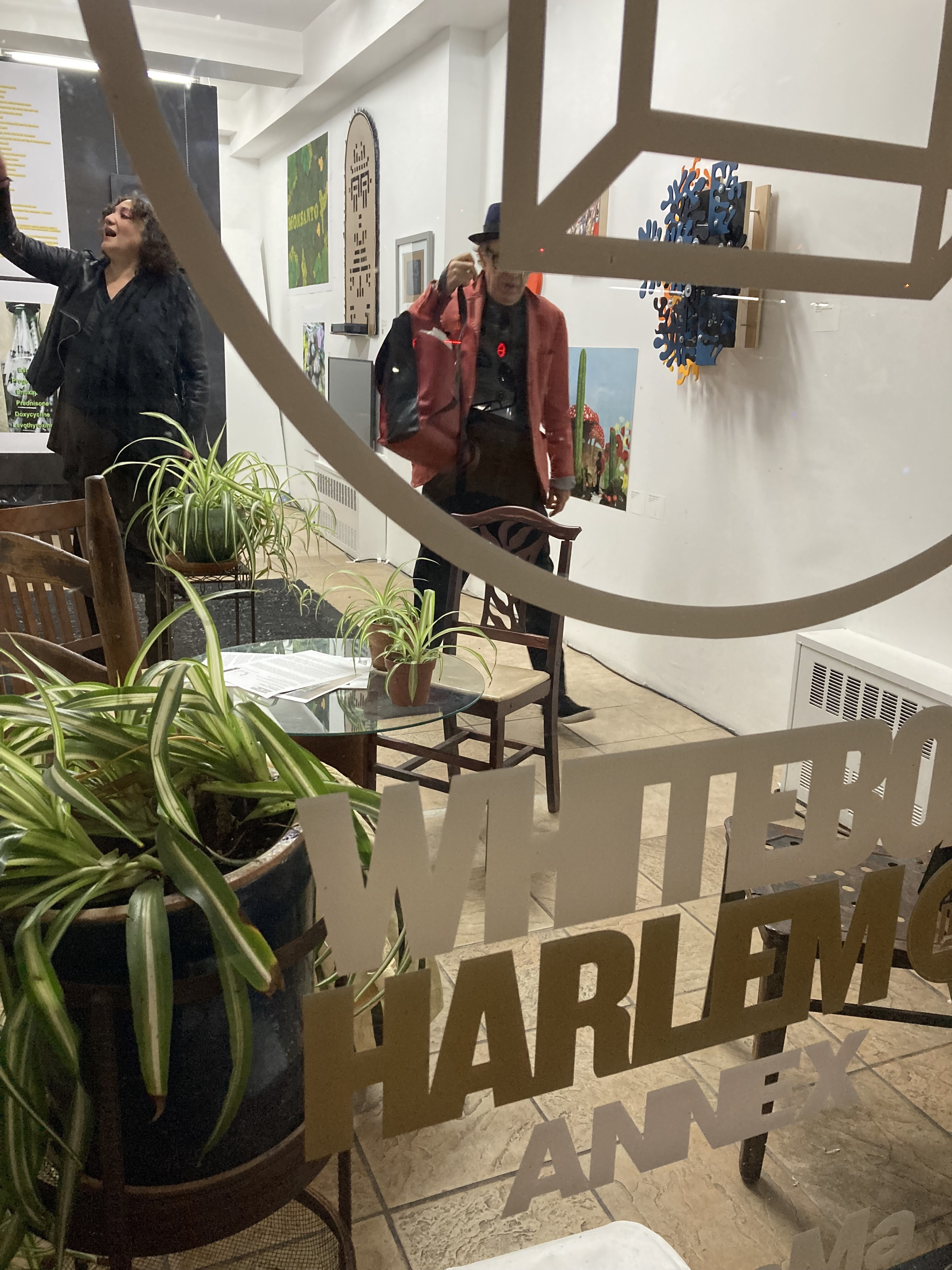
- WhiteBox in Manhattan. Photo by Julia Justo
- Established: 1998; 28 years ago
- Location: 9 Avenue B, Lower East Side, New York, NY
- Coordinates: 40°43′18.11″N 73°59′0.36″W
- Type: Art center
- Director: Juan Puntes (1998 - Present)
- Website: www.whiteboxnyc.org

WhiteBox is a non-profit contemporary art space in New York City founded and directed by Juan Puntes since 1998. Originally established in Chelsea, it later relocated to the Lower East Side, East Harlem, and currently operates in the East Village. WhiteBox hosts exhibitions, performances, video art, and community-focused programs emphasizing social justice, cultural diversity, and inclusive engagement with local and international artists.

== History ==
WhiteBox was founded in 1997 in Philadelphia by Juan Puntes and relocated to the Chelsea, New York City in 1998, where it operated as an artist-run, non-profit alternative art space. During its early years in Chelsea, Whitebox became known for presenting experimental exhibitions, site-specific installations, and international contemporary art projects. The space was founded alongside Puntes and a network of international artists, architects, and intellectuals interested in creating a platform for socially engaged and politically oriented contemporary art.

Throughout its first decade, Whitebox organized exhibitions, commissions, performances, and educational programs, often working with artists from outside the United States and with local communities in West Chelsea. The organization also hosted salon series, lectures, and artist talks, and collaborated with nearby public housing communities, including the Elliot Houses

In the years 1998 and 1999, Whitebox was nominated for “Best Group Show” by the International Art Critics Association for "Plural Speech" and for a survey of Viennese Actionists, Hermann Nitsch and Günter Brus. Later exhibitions have included artists Carolee Schneemann, Michael Snow, Dennins Oppenheim, Braco Dimitrijevic, Jon Tsoi, Naoto Nagakawa, Alison Knowles, John Cage and Aldo Tambellini.

In 2008, WhiteBox relocated to the Lower East Side of Manhattan, where it continued to develop programming that combined international exhibitions with community engagement. During this period the organization expanded its public programming and developed interdisciplinary events linking visual art, performance, and literature.

In 2018, Mr. Puntes decided to move WhiteBox again and reopen it in East Harlem, one of the largest predominantly Latino communities in New York City. Puentes was particularly interested in collaborating with immigrant and minority communities, especially those from Latin America.

In January 2022 WhiteBox moved to its current location on the Lower East Side of Manhattan.

Selected Exhibitions and Curators WhiteBox has hosted a wide range of contemporary art exhibitions, often curated by both in-house and guest curators. Below is a selection of exhibitions from 2022 to 2014, including curators and venues when available:

LES - 9 Ave B:

2024 TerraTextl Yohanna M. Roa LES

2024 Lorenzo Pace: WBX Seminal Artist Series Peter Wayne Lewis and Yohanna M. Roa

2024 Expanded Narratives on Art and Ecology Greenbox

2024 Vladimir Sorokin Blue Lard Book Launch

2023 Liu Xuguang: Dialogue with Arthur C. Danto Ursula Panhans-Bühler

2022 EXODUS VIII: Off the Cloth Karen Cordero Reiman

2022 Women on MAKING Masa Hosojima

2022 Ballots Not Bullets Curated by Raúl Zamudio

2022 WhiteNoise December Schedule Phill Niblock (curator of WhiteNoise program)

Harlem

2020 Aesthetics in the Political Kioko Sato

2016–17 Supercalifragilisticexpialidocious Curated by Lara Pan. Co‑curated by Ruben Natal‑San Miguel

LES – Broome St

2015 Anthropological Landscape Curated by Laura Cherubini

2014 Cavellini 1914–2014: A Survey, Events and Mail Art Show Curated by Mark Bloch

2014 Coded After Lovelace Curated by Faith Holland & Nora O’Murchú

2014 China: June 4, 1989 Curated by Robert Lee

2013 Outside In Curated by Barbara Pollack

2013 Beyond the Cloth: The Kafiye Project Curated by Hala A. Malak

2013 Hyman Bloom: Paintings 1940–2005 Curated by Jan Frank

2013 José Pedro Godoy: The Beloved Curated by Yael Rosenblut

2013 World Nomads: Tunisia—The After‑Revolution Curated by Leila Souissi.

2013 Zero Curated By JAN FRANK

2013 Berlése Funnel Curated By ANA C. GARCIA

== Mission ==
Whitebox works to present exhibitions that include the visual arts, experimental media, sound, poetry and video. It is committed to serving as an alternative space in which the general public and artistic community can explore, learn and engage with new ideas.

== Events ==
In 2024, WhiteBox launched End Game, the fifth edition of its quadrennial Presidential Election Exhibition Series. Curated by Ali Hossaini, Anthony Haden‑Guest, Juan Puntes, Yohanna M. Roa, Marat Guelman, Noah Fischer, Raul Zamudio, Stephen Zacks, and Yev Gelman, the show explored themes such as social inequality, immigration, institutional violence, and environmental collapse in relation to the 2024 U.S. presidential election. Earlier that year, TerraTextl (curated by Yohanna M. Roa), Lorenzo Pace: WBX Seminal Artist Series, Another Postcard Here and There: New York ArtScapes, War and Witness: Jon Tsoi, GreenBox Environmental Summer Workshops, and The III Front Window Program demonstrated the institution’s ongoing commitment to experimental, socially engaged art in the Lower East Side.

In late 2023, WhiteBox presented Intersecting Geometries, a group exhibition exploring formal abstraction and spatial inquiry as part of its Seminal Artist Series. From December 2023 to January 2024, the institution also showcased Eldon Garnet: Saved & Drowned: Nature’s Way as Means to an End, an introspective reflection on environmental and existential themes.

In 2022, the organization returned to its Lower East Side roots with Exodus VIII: Off the Cloth, co-curated by Karen Cordero Reiman and Juan Puntes, examining the intersection of cultural resistance and textile-based practices. Other key shows included Women on MAKING (curated by Masa Hosojima), Ballots Not Bullets curated by Raul Zamudio and a December sound-art series under the WhiteNoise program curated by Phill Niblock.

In 2021, at its Harlem venue, WhiteBox presented White Noise, an exhibition of sound, video, poetry, and installation featuring artists such as Jeffrey Lewis, Eva Petrič, V. Matt Sullivan, and Beatrice A. Martino. That November, Perfect Day: Drugs and Art, curated by Raul Zamudio and Juan Puntes, explored the role of substance and healing in art, featuring artists including Abdul Vas, Antonio Caro, Chin Chih Yang, Bradley Eros, Jason Mena, and Javier Téllez, among others.

In 2019, settled into its East Harlem location, White Box-Harlem presented the first mayor survey of Japanese experimental filmmaker Ko Nakajima in New York. Multiple screenings by the artist from the ‘60s to the ‘80s were shown. The exhibition received financial support from the Lower Manhattan Cultural Council.

In October 2021 an exhibition devoted to sound and multimedia art titled "White Noise" was presented. The show included a diverse group of international artists working on musical performance, video projection, poetry, installation and a live reading and screening of a graphic novel by indie-rocker and social critic, Jeffrey Lewis. Participating artists included Eva Petrič, V. Matt Sullivan and Beatrice A. Martino.

In November 2021 an international group exhibition titled "Perfect Day: Drugs and Art" was presented. It was curated by Raul Zamudio and Juan Puntes. Participating artists included Abdul Vas, Antonio Caro, Chin Chih Yang, Bradley Eros, Jason Mena, Javier Téllez, Julia Justo, Julia San Martin, Lorin Roser, Max Blagg, Nina Kuo, and Tamiko Kawata among others
