= Lorin Roser =

American artist, musician (born 20th century)

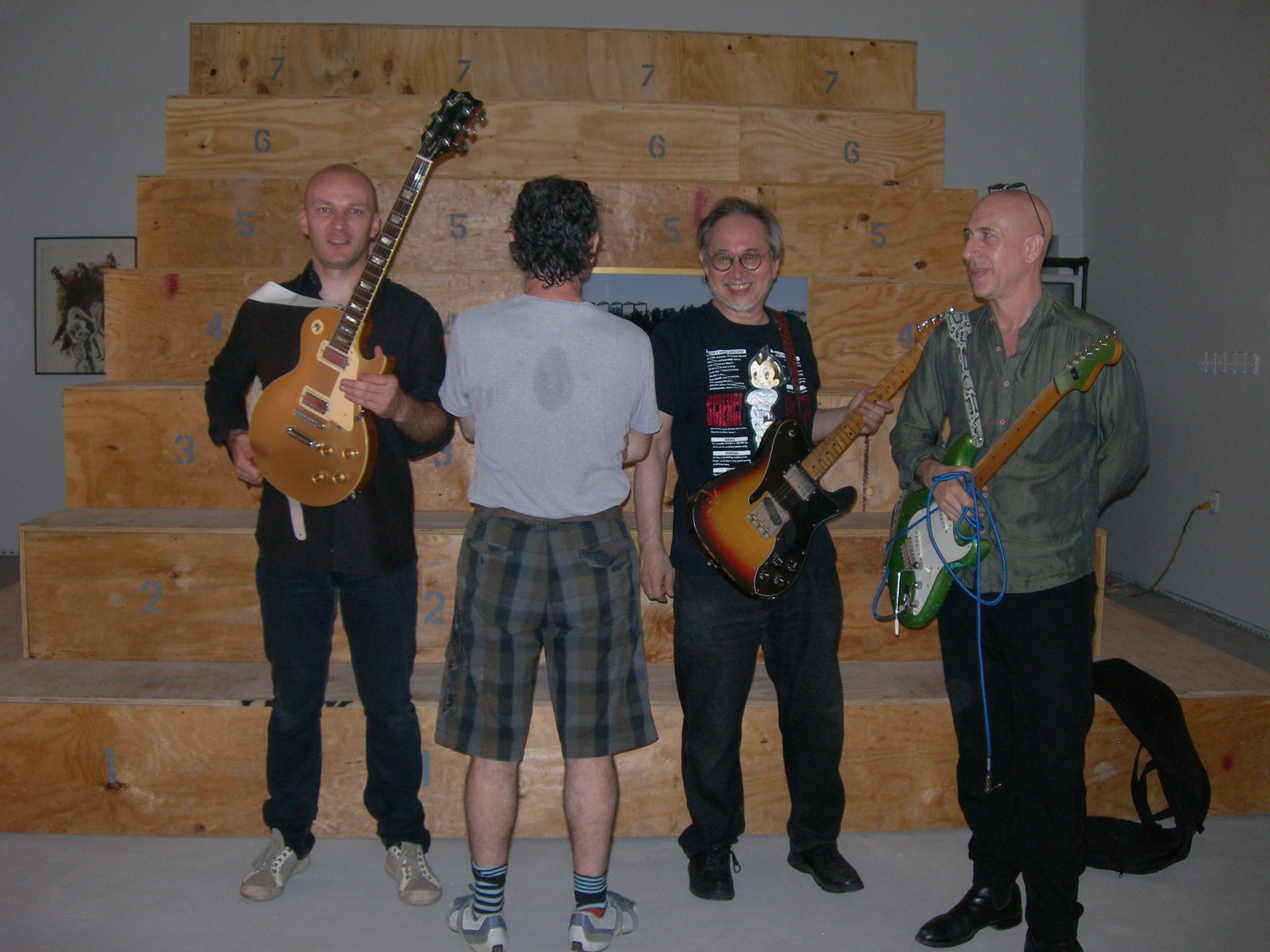
- Lorin Roser, Elliot Sharpe, Frank Vigeroux Juan Puntes at White Box Art Space NYC.
- Education: Princeton University, UCLA
- Known for: Animation, painting, music, multimedia art, architecture
- Notable work: Architopia, Robot Restoration Guitar, performances at CBGB, WhiteBox NYC, New Museum
- Style: Multimedia, digital animation, experimental music
- Partner: Nina Kuo

Lorin Roser (born 20th century) is a Chinese American New York–based multifaceted animator, painter, musician and multimedia artist.

As an architect and artist his animation work uses "random manipulations to explore a world of hitherto unseen shapes and structural possibilities". Roser is partners with Nina Kuo.

== Early life and education ==
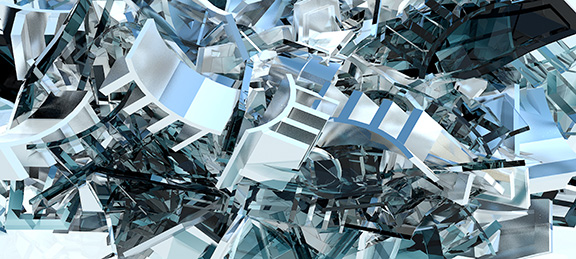
Corbu-ruption, digital video animation shown at The New Museum, NYC's "Ideas City", 2015, curated by Joseph Grima.

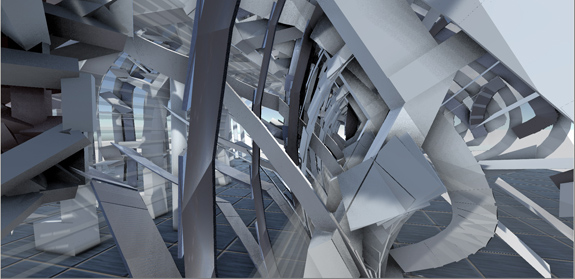
Architopia, 3-D animation book

Lorin Roser was born on the East Coast of the United States. He studied architecture with Kenneth Frampton, Emilio Ambasz, Yoshio Taniguchi, and Craig Hodgetts at Princeton University and earned an Master of Arts degree at the University of California, Los Angeles.

== Career ==
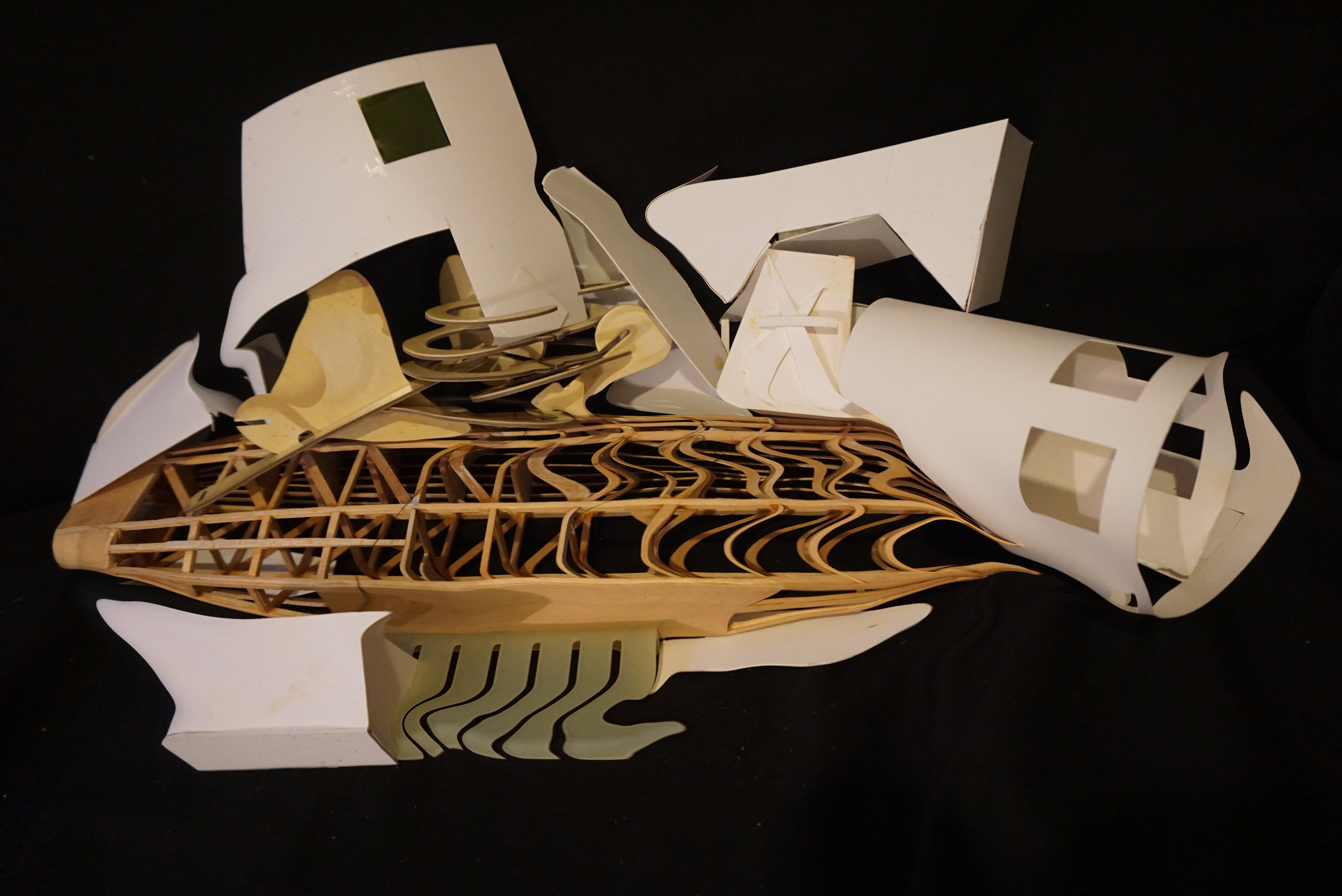
Architopia Boat, sculptural wooden board maquette executed for gallery installation

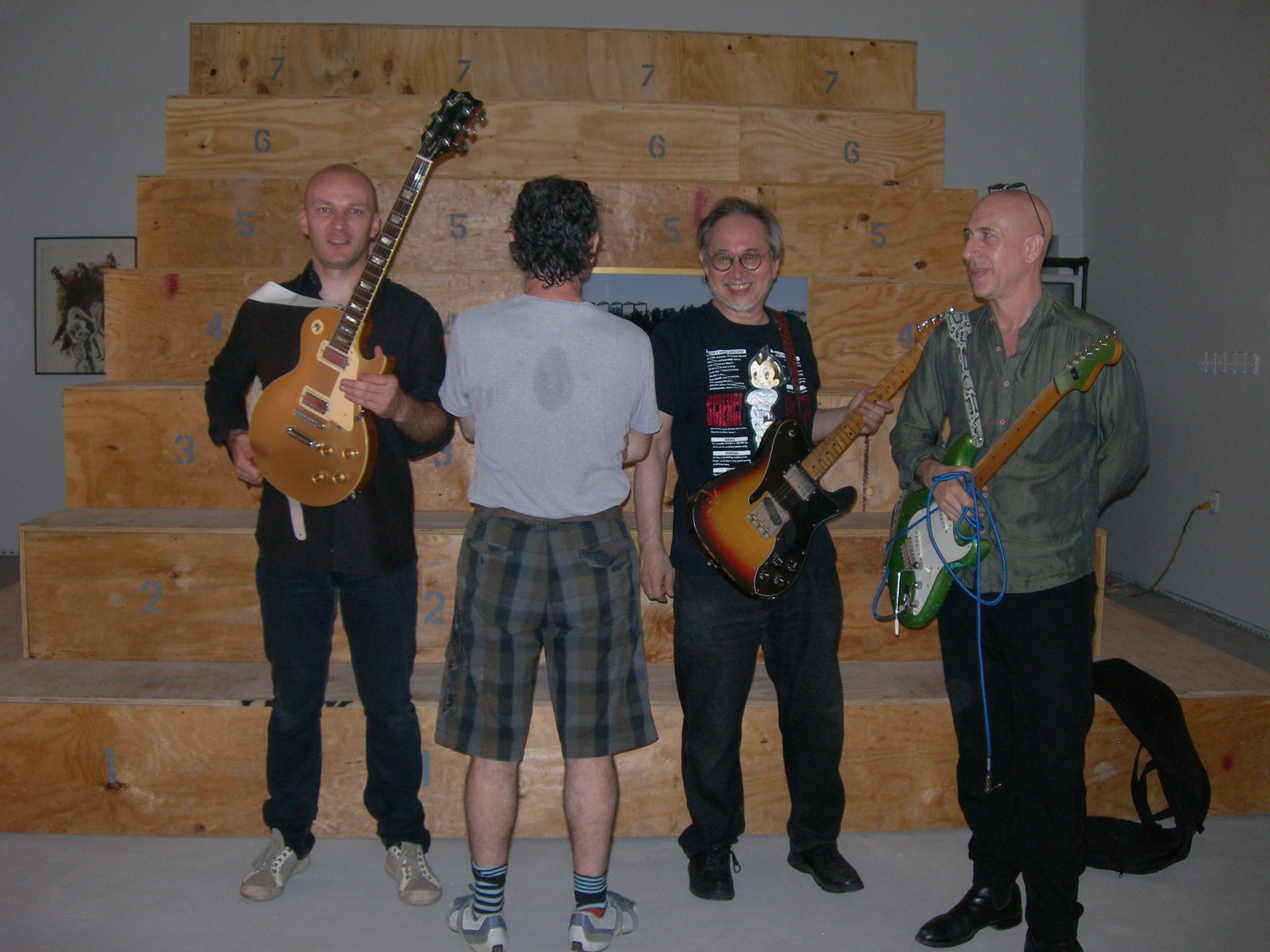
Experimental collaborative sound event: Frank Vigeroux, Juan Puntes (back to camera), Roser, Elliott Sharp at WhiteBox Art Space NYC

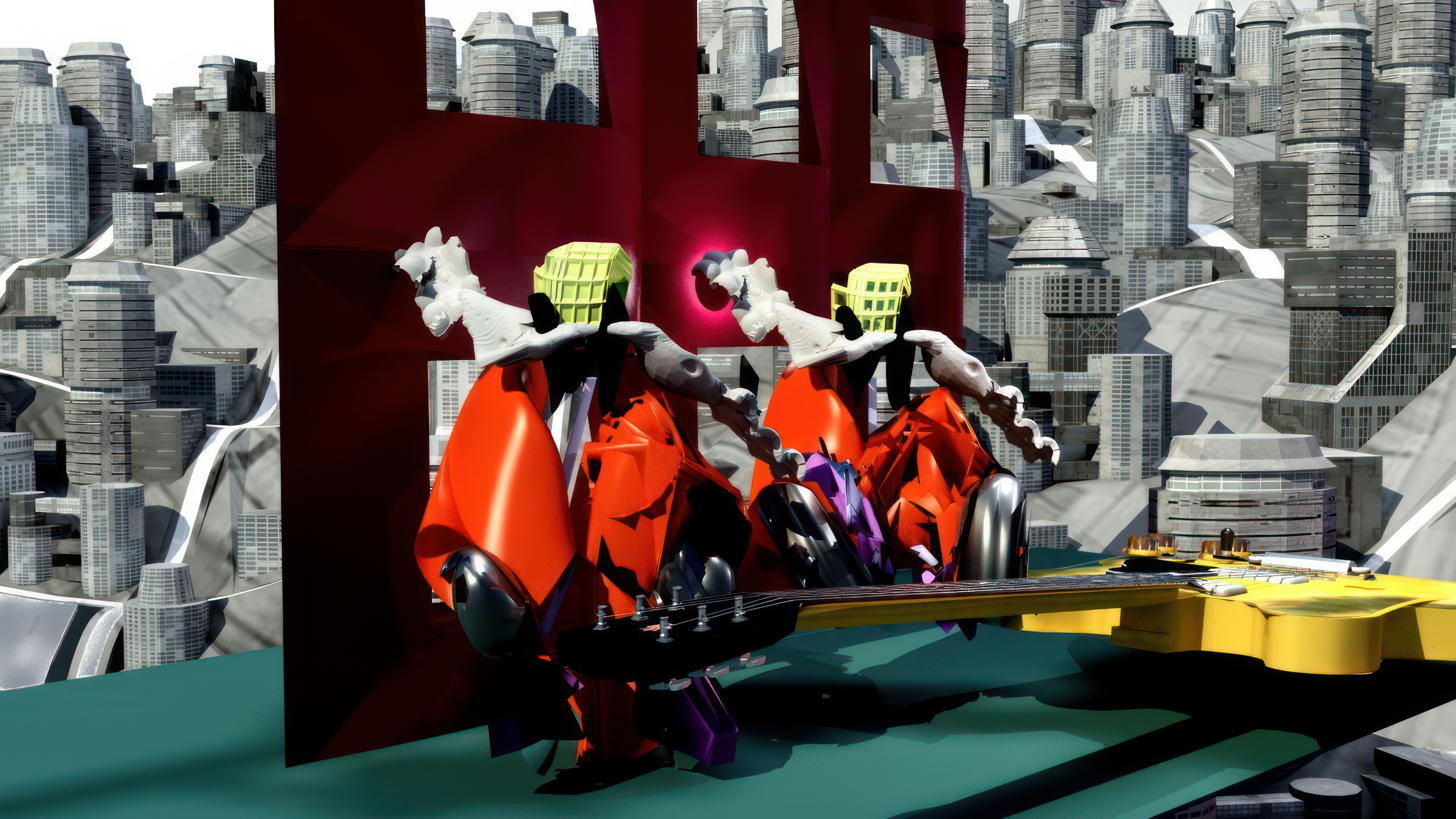
Robot Restoration Guitar, digital graphic created for public mural

Roser moved to New York City in the 1980s where he met artist Nina Kuo and began many artistic collaborations with her. Participating in the New York City downtown art scene, he has been a sought-after musician and performer since the 1980s, performing at CBGB's, Franklin Furnace, the Emily Harvey Foundation, the WhiteBox art center with Elliott Sharp, events for curator/performance artist Arleen Schloss and composed music for Verneta Nemec's performance art works. He has also written music for Larry Litt and Hector Canonge. He participated in the "Digital Art Symposium" at Lightbox, NYC in 2019. Roser is the composer for the award-winning documentary It's A to Z: The Art of Arleen Schloss, about influential artist Arleen Schloss.

Besides animations and music, he also designs book covers, most recently for Digital Media: Transformations in Human Communication by Paul Messaris and Lee Humphries.

As he continues making art, Roser is moving into 3D animations, melding music and form with the digital world. He states, "Visualization is a great tool for architecture because building bricks and mortar is so expensive and computer animation mimics the unfolding of space as you walk through a building. Now I am obsessed with using math to create music and form. The computer excels at this type of exploration."

Roser's work is in the collection of major international museums, galleries, and archives including Franklin Furnace Archives, Museum of Modern Art, Otis Art Institute, the Chicago Art Institute Library, and the Thomas J. Watson Library of the Metropolitan Museum of Art.

== Collections ==
- Chicago Art Institute Library
- Franklin Furnace Archives
- Museum of Modern Art
- Otis Art Institute
- Watson Library, Metropolitan Museum of Art

== Select exhibitions and performances ==
- Eastern Margins' Respect Our Elders, online, London, 2021
- Outscape Escape, Gallery 456, New York City, 2021
- Make America Great, WhiteBox art center, New York City, 2016
- New Museum, IDEAS City, 2015
- Re-wired/Re-wired: Event for Dismembered Body, with Stelarc, Perth Institute of Contemporary Arts and online, 2015
- Protests Performance, Bronx Museum of the Arts, New York City, curated by Hector Canonge, 2015
- Harvestworks, New York City performance, 2015
- Electronica performance with Elliott Sharp entitled "Klang", WhiteBox art center, New York City
- Bowery Poetry Club – Zen Loopology with Jason Hwang, Helen Yee, Daniel Carter, and John Marino
- Flushing Town Hall – Tang Loopology

== Awards ==
- 2014 Art Award Catalog Sumei Multidisciplinary Art Center "Ironbound/Unbound" issue, NJ art video with Nina Kuo
