= Filipino-American art =

Filipino-American art includes art and music forms done by Filipino Americans. It has been growing in number in 2016. Filipino Americans are starting to be known for art, singing, and even dancing. As we go back in history like Americans, Filipinos have been using the form of art to express themselves, to tell a story about their ancestors, to give a voice to those who feel like they do not have a voice or the right to speak up. Filipino American Artist also uses all types of art to have this sense of belonging and identity. Going back to history the Philippines was taken over by America and Spain, and since then some believe they do not know who they exactly are. Filipino Americans struggle to find their own identity, because like all Asian Americans they are looked down upon because there would be people who categorize them as only “Filipino” but there are other people who can also categorize them as only "American". This stigma results in identity loss, not being able to know where you belong and how to fit in. But with the help of different forms of art it gives the opportunity for Filipino Americans to be in touch with their Filipino roots as well as their American roots.

== Filipino-American identity and hip hop ==
For many years hip hop has been an outlet for anyone who felt like they needed to express themselves or a calling to those who have felt oppressed. Filipino Americans throughout history have always been at some sort of identity crisis. “If this history is not remembered or associated with the experiences of Filipino Americans today, the colonizers’ historical records favor U.S. exceptionalism by not recognizing a pattern of white supremacy and imperialism.” (Bischoff) He explains that throughout history all we learn about is American history, and African American history etc. but you really do not see a huge chunk of Filipino American history. We do not hear about how America took over the Philippines, or how Spain and America worked together to fool the Philippines. Even education was not up to the Filipinos, America sent people to teach Filipinos the history of the Americans. So it is not a huge surprise when Filipinos migrate to the United States where they do not know who they are.

Hip hop plays a huge role into this identity crisis. Young Filipino Americans are affected mostly because of this because of all the racial comments they get from people. Hip-Hop has been put out there originating from African Americans rapping about how they were oppressed, or how they have been segregated for too long. Filipino Americans also used this as an outlet to talk about their issues with society. In the book "Writer in Exile/Writer in Revolt: Critical Perspectives on Carlos Bulosan" Viola talks about how Hip-Hop in general talks about the movements that has been made, it replicates the feelings that people had, how strongly they felt about what mattered to them the most. Hip-Hop is this form of expression that put what people wanted to fight for in a form of expression where everybody and anybody could listen to it. Filipino Americans also used Hip-hop to talk about how they are present now, that we are not the same as every Asian American, there are many different races and ethnicities and we have different backgrounds, different cultures than the different races.

=== Black Eyed Peas ===
One of the most popular groups in music history was The Black Eyed Peas. One of their founding members Apl.de.ap, or previously known as Allan Pineda, is a Filipino American. He was born in the Philippines but came to the United States as he grew up. In the United States he quickly found Taboo, and Wil.I.am; together they formed a group but soon enough fell apart for personal reasons. Apl soon realized that there were many problems that he had to face: he could not send money to his family back home, as well as his brother committing suicide. He eventually went back to the Philippines to remember his roots. He had forgotten what it was like to be back and to see all the hardships and struggles people go through everyday to make a living. He came out with a song called “The APL Song”, which contained lyrics describing the hardships he saw in the Philippines “How would you feel if you had to catch your meal, Build a hut to live and to eat and chill in, Having to pump the water outta the ground?” (Devitt) This is an example of Filipino Americans using their voice and talents to shed light on Filipino history and struggles faced in everyday lives. As time went on he formed a new group called the Black Eyed Peas, he then also came up with a new song called "Bebot" which means "chick" in English. He also sheds light on the Filipino communities and cultures they have. He talks about the dishes that Filipinos are widely known for like chicken adobo, “pan de sal” which is Filipino bread, as well as "balut" which is a fertilized bird egg. This was history changing because we saw that people are starting to be more aware of their cultural and Filipino roots because The Black Eyed Peas started to use their voice and fame to make people more aware of issues that are not really talked about in everyday lives.

== Filipino American dancers ==
As there are many Filipino American artists singing wise, there are also many Filipino American dancers. With many forms of expression dancing is another outlet to express how Filipino American people feel. Filipino Americans started using dance as a form of letting loose as early as the 1920s. Filipino Americans started going to taxi dance halls where Filipino men were allowed to showcase their dancing abilities as well as socialize with women. This was one of the first times where Filipino Americans did not feel oppressed, and that they can be as equal as the other races. These men were praised by many people and this was a start of something new.

Today we have many uprising Filipino American dancers who express themselves. Shows like “So You Think You Can Dance” and “America’s Best Dance Crew” gave many people opportunities to showcase their dancing abilities. In the bunch of dance crews and people who competed in the years. There were many Filipino Americans who have competed and won. Dtrix (Dominic Sandoval), Ryanimay Conferido are some of the few who have competed for “So You Think You Can Dance” but also have combined their skills to have won season three of “America’s Best Dance Crew” with their dance crew “Quest Crew.” Another famous dance crew who predominantly is made of many Filipino Americans is a crew called “The Jabbawockeez” who was the first ever dance crew to win ABDC. These are just a few of the many and talented Filipino Americans who use their talents to express themselves as well as inspire other young Filipino Americans to follow their dreams.

== Filipino American artists ==
Another form of expression used to showcase Filipino American pride is visual art. Movements like Surrealism and Cubism were made popular by Pablo Picasso. Each era so different from the other because it depended on what was going on in history and how the artist himself felt. Like Picasso, Filipino-American artist Paul Pfeiffer created an art piece called “Leviathan” which is a painting that depicts many blonde wigs coming out of a frame. The hidden meaning to this art piece is that he wanted to show how having the western look/American look was a Filipino American’s dream, to look like the people on TV as well as be like them. Paul wanted to depict it like this because it shows how the wigs are everywhere but also is a metaphor because while people were so obsessed with being like the Westerners, Filipino history was never told and forgotten. America hid the cruel things they have done to the Filipinos. Picasso used his art to show how he felt at the time, and in each era he felt something different the same goes with Paul Pfeiffer he created in art piece that shows how he felt about Filipino American history. How he felt about Filipino Americans giving in to Western culture, as well as the untold history of the Philippines. There are many more artists as well as art pieces who empower the Filipino American.

== Filipino cultural night ==
Pilipino Cultural Night (PCN) is an event that Filipino American students have made up to stage in touch with their roots, and although there is not a specific person who is well known for PCNs. It is a huge factor in Filipino American’s (as well as other people who are not Filipino American) expression and another way for them to keep in touch with their family and friend’s roots. PCNs were dance, song, and art forms all in one event. They allowed students to learn about their forgotten and unspoken history. Students around the nation have adapted the idea of a PCN. PCN dates all the way back to 1980 in California where a group of students were curious about their cultural roots. Today PCNs are performed all over the United States educating everyone on Filipino culture.

In PCNs there are usually four suites that base the performances. The four suites Rural, Cordillera, Tribal, and Muslim. In each suite you see how different they are. Each suite contains many different dances that tell a different part of history of the Philippines. This is important because Filipino American students that put on these performances not only tell the story of our ancestors but they are also educated on the struggles and hardships they faced. PCN is included in Filipino American Artists because students pay tribute to the Pilipino history, you do not have to be famous and well-known nationally in order to show your support for the Filipino American history.

In Filipino-American performances, many dances are theatrically altered versions of rituals and dances. Although criticized by some, PCN's were created for the community at-large to receive information they never did before, whether it be about Filipino history, dances, rituals, or Fil-Am experiences. Dances such as "Sarimanok", "Tahing", and "Mumbaki" tell the stories of rituals performed in the Philippines. Mumbaki depicts the ritual of priests praying to the god for a successful harvest.

== Skeptics ==
Over time there seems to be a pattern on the fame Filipino American Artists. Some may believe that fame Filipino Americans get are based on their ethnicity instead of their talent. Famous artists like Charice Pempengco rose to fame when people saw her internet videos on YouTube giving her millions of hits. She was then flown to America where she guest appeared on major TV shows like Ellen, Oprah, and Glee. While being interviewed on Oprah, she was questioned more about how she was Filipino coming to America than her music abilities. On Glee she played Sunshine Corazon, a transfer student from the Philippines who is a stereotypical Filipina. This raises the question of whether Filipinos are famous for their abilities or because they are Filipino.
