= Nina Kuo =

Chinese American painter, photographer, sculptor, author, video artist and activist

- 郭麗娜
- Occupations: Visual Artist; Painter; Multimedia Artist
- Years active: 1975-present
- Notable work: Tang Ladies
- Partner: Lorin Roser
- Website: MythicalMuse.com

Nina Kuo (Chinese: 郭麗娜) is an Asian American painter, photographer, sculptor, author, video artist and activist who lives and works in New York City. Her work examines the role of women, feminism and identity in Asian-American art. Kuo has worked in partnership with the artist Lorin Roser. Kuo has been described as being a pioneer of AAPI and Chinese American art and culture.

Kuo grew up in Buffalo, New York, the daughter of abstract painter James K.Y. Kuo. She received a Bachelor of Science degree from State University College At Buffalo.

After moving to New York City, Kuo became part of the CETA-funded Cultural Council Foundation Artists Project. She worked in activist art communities such as Basement Workshop and as the first resident artist at the Asian American Arts Centre building registries through interviews and curation. Kuo was part of the Godzilla Asian American Arts Network. She went to China and met her grandmother who she photographed and referenced in later photographic books and exhibits. She was part of the 1990 Clocktower exhibition at MpMA PS1 in a show against racial prejudice, and her mural Politeness in Poverty of 1988 was installed in the Broadway Lafayette subway station in New York City.

In 1991, Kuo's photographs of the Brooklyn West Indian Day parade were selected by Thelma Golden for a group show at the Wunsch Arts Center. She was included by Marcia Tucker in the Bad Girls (art exhibition) at The New Museum in 1994. Her photo work was included by Lucy Lippard in The Lure of the Local: Senses of Place in a Multicentered Society following a residency at Museum of Chinese in America. In 1999 Kuo exhibited her Chi Pao (Chinese Banner Dresses) at the Center for Photography at Woodstock that addressed gender stereotypes prevalent in Chinatown.

Kuo's was part of the Godzilla Asian American Arts Network where she showed and exhibited various types of paintings which showcased her experiences as an artist living in New York City. With "an interdisciplinary approach, her work confronts feminist perspectives and confronts racism." She continues to experiment with different media and art forms, combining painting and collage work. Her paintings and influences are taken from early Abstract Expressionist forms and colligraphic sources, arranged in mental colorized fields.

== Work ==
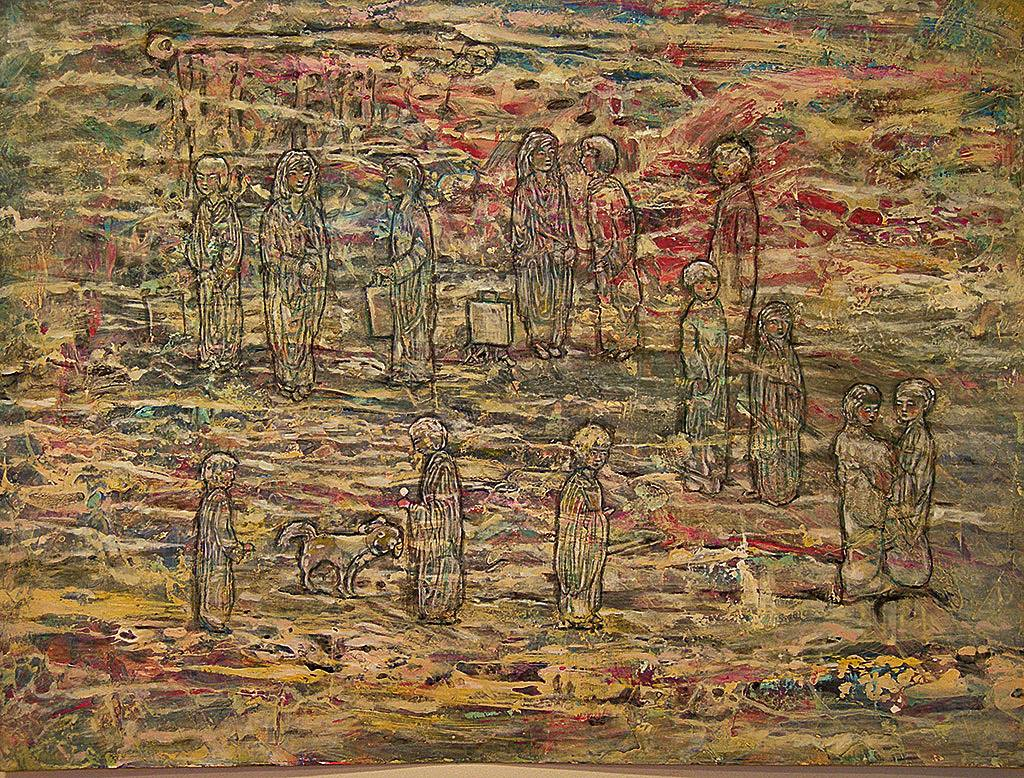
Scholars shopping bag and dog

In 2002 Lehman College Art Gallery presented If the Shoe Fits.... Holland Cotter noted that when the artist first met her grandmother in 1980 she proudly displayed the three-inch-long shoes she wore on her bound feet. In 2009, Kuo created a series of video, animation and installation art works called Mythical Montage, which examined "illusion, feminine irony and transformations of Asian influences" and her Tang Ladies were described as "statuesque, delicate and quiet on the canvas as they investigate anachronistic details" referencing the Chinese woman's desire to fit in, as well as the often negative connotation given to them by society, specifically in New York City. In 2013, Kuo commemorated Danny Chen, who committed suicide after harassment and hazing for being Asian-American. In 2014 she was featured in a solo show at Andre Zarre. Her animated experimental videos, “Ideas City,” was shown at the New Museum in 2015 and Mana Contemporary, Miami in 2019. Early cultural influences from her travels in China, Japan, Thailand, Southeast Asia and Hong Kong were documented in 2016 on WNYU radio. That same year, she submitted her Face Montage to the What is Feminist Art? collection at the Lawrence A. Fleischman Gallery, it consisted of various images of Chinatown bands and a portrait of Danny Chen. She has described her Art Deviation exhibition in 2020 as “work that has more surprise and mystery, that is more thought provoking, pleasing and enticing so that it's not just technique... You are trying to draw them into a conversation, to bring in something unusual, to make the viewer sense there is a tantalizing experience.” In 2022–2023, her hand printed photo works Contrapted Series Chinatown and Contrapted Series Quilt, Brooklyn (both 1983), which overlay photographs of New York neighbourhoods with colourful fragments, demonstrating how cultural memory is made from scattered debris, were shown at the Museum of Modern Art's Just Above Midtown (JAM) Gallery.

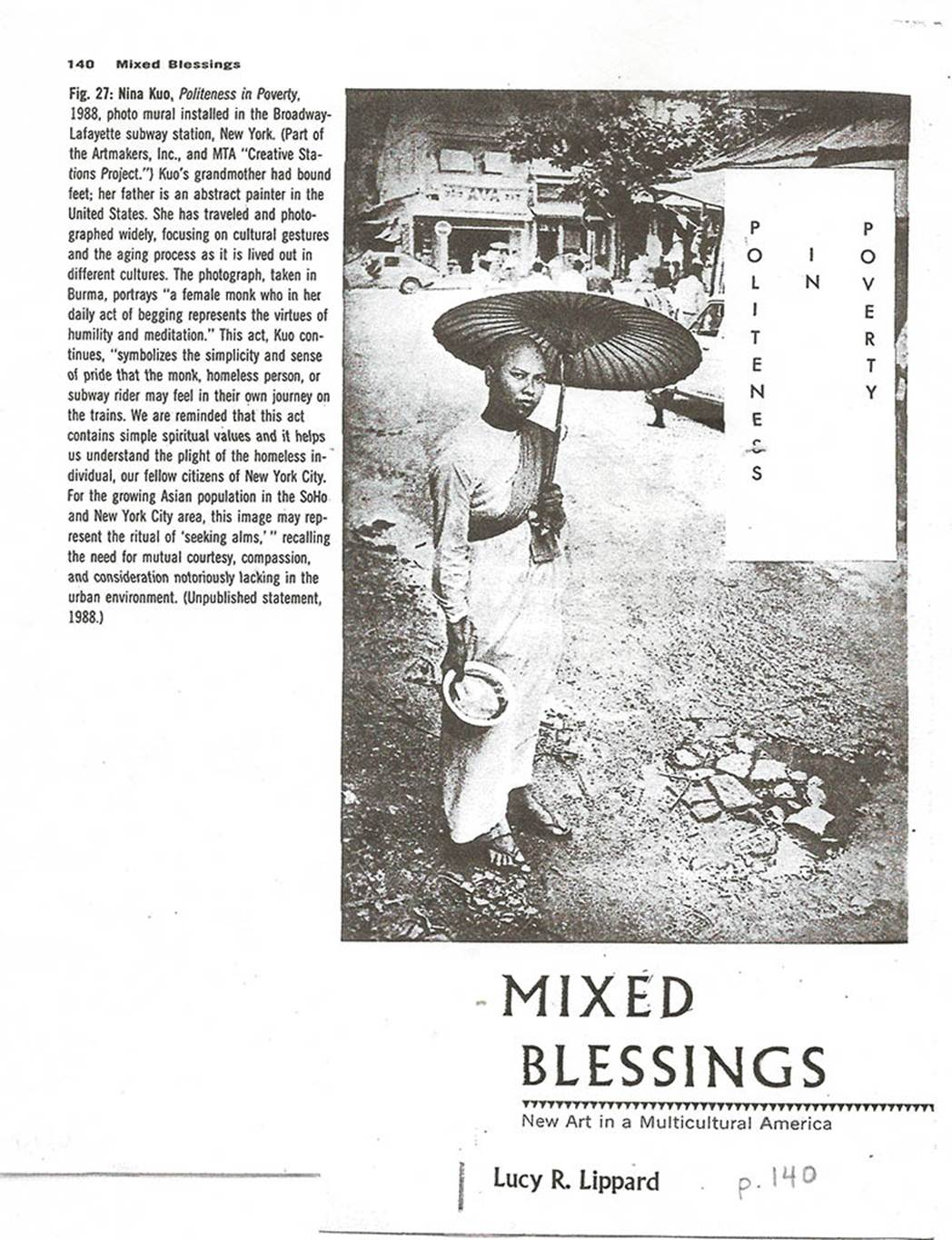
Politeness and Poverty public mural, image from book by Lucy Lippard, Mixed Blessings New Art in a Multicultural America

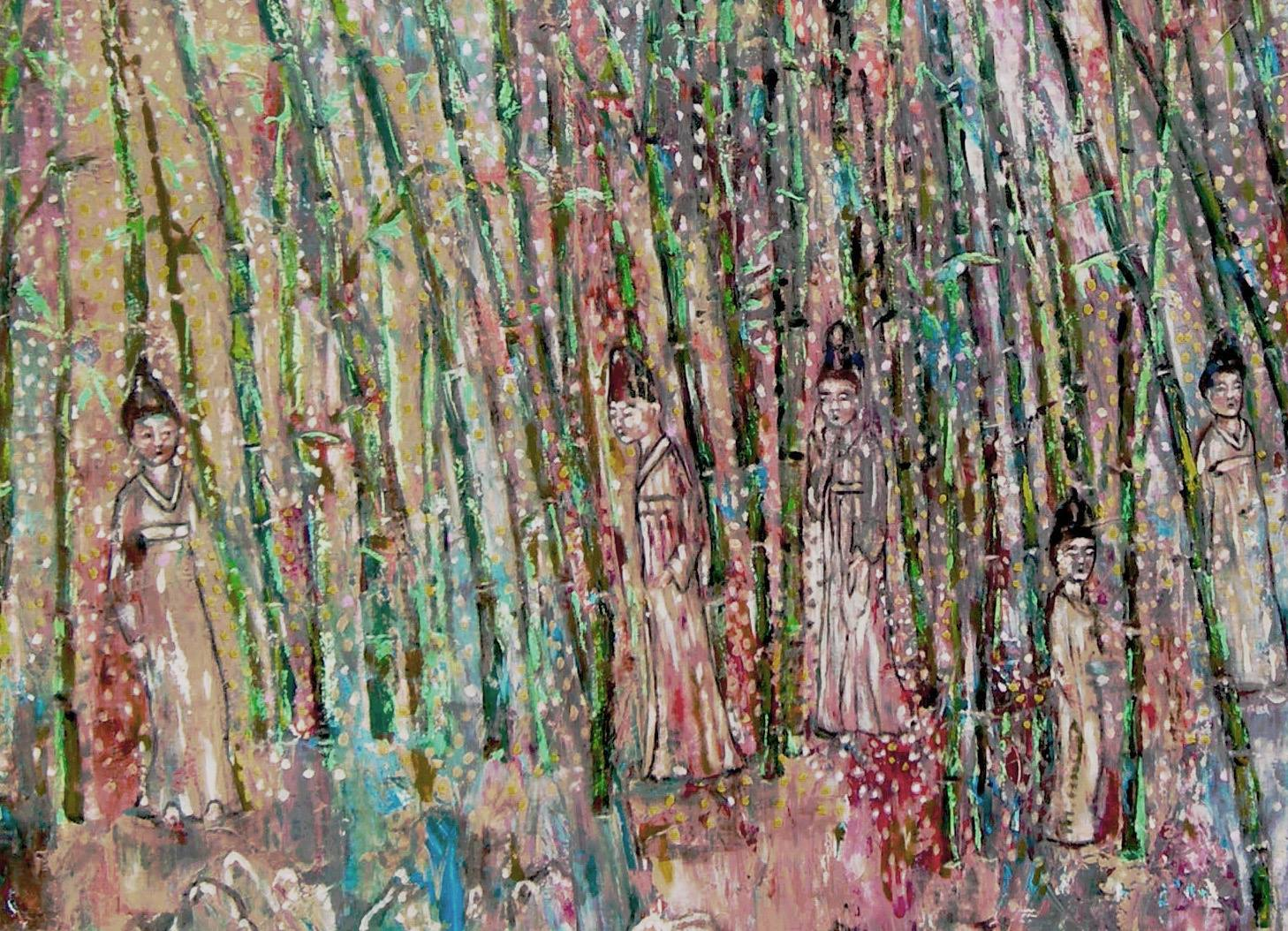
Dot Bamboo, a painted mural and videoscape

Kuo received scholarships and studied at International Center of Photography in New York City. Her work is in the collections of Brooklyn Museum of Art and New Museum in New York City. She has lectured at the New School, Newark Museum, Beijing University, Central Academy of Art, Beijing. With other artists she wrote an autobiographical chapter for the book "Last Artist Standing: Living and Sustaining a Creative Life over 50" by Sharon Louden.

In 2020, she created a series of sculptures, "Tomb Clay Figures," honoring those who died during the COVID-19 pandemic. She described it as: "This global pandemic pinpoints how death is mentally difficult. My goal is to create art that can reinvent these emotions, while honoring people we have all admired."

In 2020, her photomontage work was exhibited in The Smithsonian's exhibition, "What Is Feminist Art? Revisted and was added to their permanent collection.

The Art Newspaper 4 November 2022 writes, "Nina Kuo’s Contrapted Series Chinatown and Contrapted Series Quilt, Brooklyn (both 1983), overlay photographs of the titular New York neighbourhoods with colourful fragments, demonstrating how cultural memory is made from scattered debris."

== Exhibitions ==
=== Solo ===
- 2007: "Chanel Chinoiserie," Cheryl McGinnis Gallery, New York, NY
- 2009: "Mythical Museum," with Lorin Roser, Gallery 456, New York, NY
- 2014: "New Works: Artquakes," Andre Zarre Gallery, New York, NY
- 2020: "Art Deviation," Flushing Town Hall, Queens, New York

=== Group ===
- 1978: Group show, Just Above Midtown Gallery, New York, NY
- 1984: "ID: An Exhibition of Third World Woman Photographers," MoMA PS1, New York, NY
- 1988: "TransAtlantic Traditions: Women Photographers from the USA and Puerto Rico,” Camerawork Gallery, London, curated by Kellie Jones
- 1990: "Communycations: Public Mirror: Artists Against Racial Prejudice," MoMA PS1 (New York, NY)
- 1991: "Visual Narratives," Wunsch Arts Center, Glen Cove, NY, curated by Thelma Golden
- 1994: "Bad Girls (Part II)," New Museum of Contemporary Art New York (New York, NY)
- 2002: "Constellation – Celebrating 25 Years," Center for Photography at Woodstock: CPW (Woodstock, NY)
- 2003: "It's A Small World," China 2000 Fine Art (New York, NY)
- 2005: "New York Eviction Blues," Asian American Arts Centre, New York, NY
- 2014: "Occupied Canvas," Andre Zarre Gallery
- 2019: "What is Feminist Art?," Archives of American Art, Smithsonian Institution, Washington, D.C.
- 2022: "Just Above Midtown: Changing Spaces," Museum of Modern Art, New York, NY
- 2024: "GODZILLA: Echoes from the 1990s Asian American Arts Network." Eric Firestone Gallery, New York, NY

== Collections ==
Kuo's work is in the collections of the Brooklyn Museum, Library of Congress, Biblioteque Nationale, and New Museum.

== Grants and residencies ==
- 1982: Asian American Arts Centre – Artist residency
- 1986: Artmatters – Grant
- 1990: Museum of Chinese in America – Artist residency
- 1993: Arts International – Travel grant to China1999: Light Work (Syracuse, NY) – Artist residency
- 1999: Center for Photography at Woodstock (CPW), now known as Catskill Center for Photography – Artist residency
- 2001, 2002: New York Foundation for the Arts (NYFA) – Artist grant
- 2002: Travel Grant to Japan to study Zen Painting

== Publications ==
- Kuo, Nina; Roser, Lorin (sound) (1984). Architectonic Inscapes. Los Angeles, CA: Women's Graphic Center. OCLC 232641597.
- Florschuetz, Thomas; Younger, Dan; Diamond, Ted; Evers, Winfred; Kuo, Nina (1988). Thomas Florschuetz, Dan Younger, Ted Diamond, Winfred Evers, Nina Kuo. Syracuse, NY: Light Work. OCLC 71801380. Catalog of an exhibition held at the Robert B. Menschel Photography Gallery, Syracuse, NY
- Eleanor Hearney. "Nina Kuo's Mingled Realities." From catalog, Mythica Muses. 17 January - 17 February 2007.
- Jonathan Goodman. Art in America. May 2007.
- Marisa Crawford. "Revisiting the Question “What Is Feminist Art?” Hyperallergic. October 15, 2020.
- Anisa Tavangar. "The Big Review: Just Above Midtown at the Museum of Modern Art" The Art Newspaper 4 November 2022. https://www.theartnewspaper.com/2022/11/04/the-big-review-just-above-midtown
