= Daemen University =

Private college in Amherst, New York, US

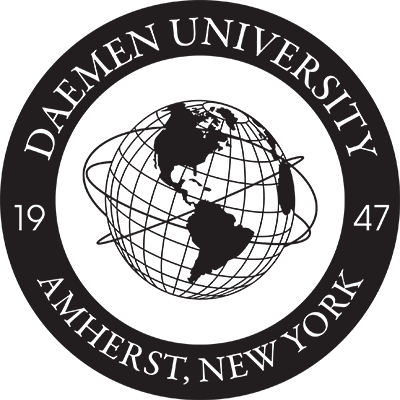
- Former names: Rosary Hill College (1947–1976); Daemen College (1976–2022)
- Motto: A World of Opportunity
- Type: Private university
- Established: 1947
- Academic affiliations: ACCU, CIC, CICU, and NAICU
- Endowment: $22.6 million (2024)
- President: Gary A. Olson
- Provost: Michael Brogan
- Students: 2,536 (Fall 2020)
- Undergraduates: 1,631 (Fall 2020)
- Postgraduates: 905 (Fall 2020)
- Location: Amherst, New York, United States; 42.9654°N 78.7888°W
- Campus: 46.5 acres (18.8 ha); Suburban
- Colors: Blue and white
- Nickname: Wildcats
- Sporting affiliations: NCAA Division II - ECC
- Mascot: Willie the Wildcat
- Website: www.daemen.edu
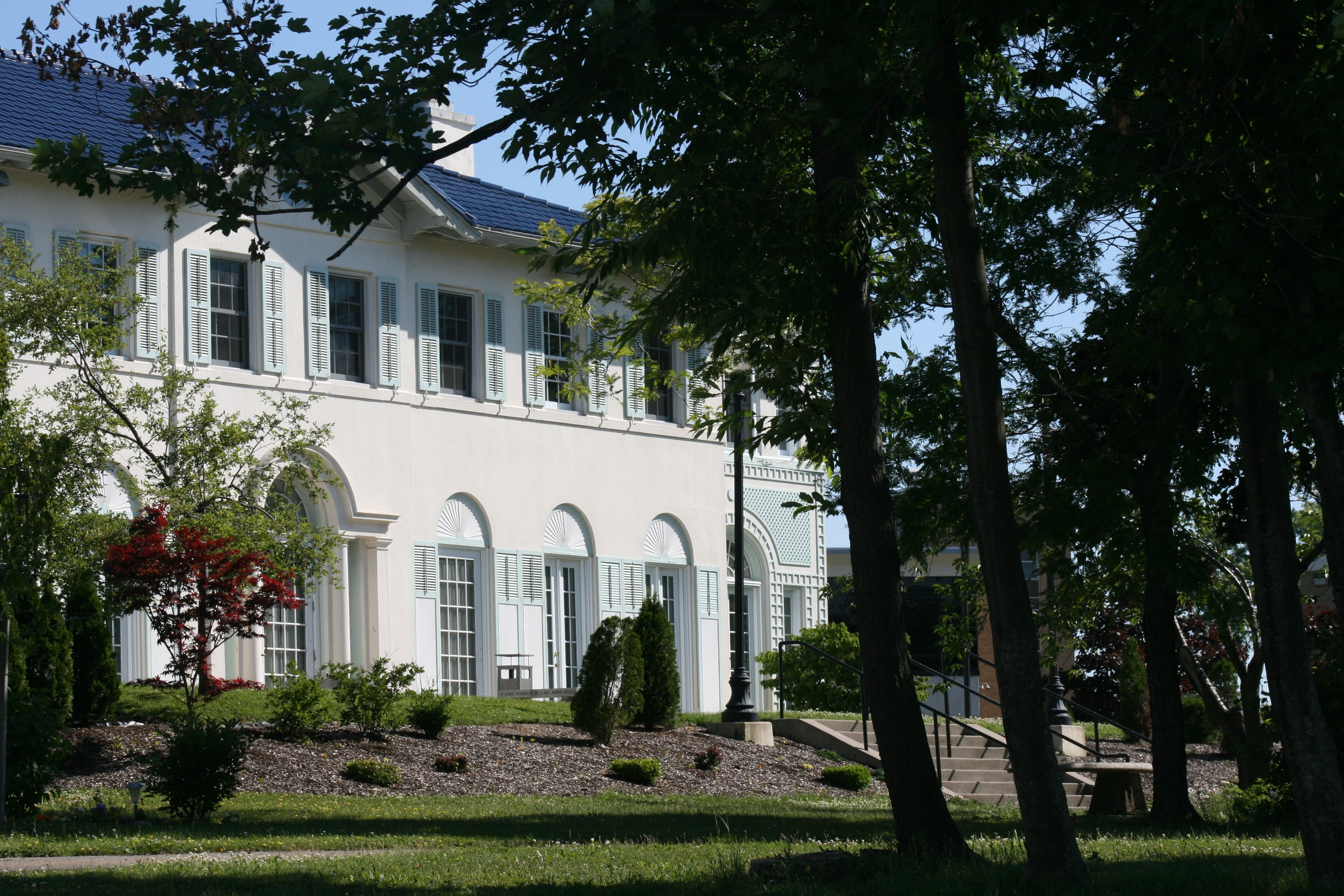

Daemen University is a private university in Amherst, New York, United States. Formerly Daemen College and Rosary Hill College, the nonsectarian school was founded as a Catholic institution by the Sisters of St. Francis in 1947.

As of fall 2020, 2,536 students were enrolled at Daemen (1,631 undergraduate, 905 graduate), and 64 degree majors were offered.

In March 2022, the New York State Board of Regents approved a name change to Daemen University.

== Main campus ==
Located in Western New York, Daemen's main 46.5-acre (18.8 ha) campus is in a suburban setting in Amherst, New York in the Buffalo Niagara Region. Daemen is on Main Street in Amherst and close to the New York State Thruway and I-290 and the Buffalo Niagara International Airport. The Amherst campus contains 19 buildings or complexes with classrooms, laboratories, residential and athletics facilities.

== History ==
In 1947, Rosary Hill College was established by the Sisters of St. Francis of Penance and Christian Charity as a Catholic institution of higher education for women offering studies in the liberal arts. The institution has admitted men since the mid-1960s and graduated its first male student in 1965. In 1976, Rosary Hill became a secular and independent institution and was renamed Daemen College, in honor of the founder of the Sisters of St. Francis – Mother Magdalene Daemen, of Holland.

In 2015, Daemen opened the Academic Wellness Center after a $5.6 million renovation of the former YMCA building on Main Street in Amherst.

In 2017, to mark its 70th anniversary, Daemen installed Founders Bell, which was forged in 1858 and restored by the Class of 1967. Each year, the bell is the centerpiece of Founders Celebration, an annual tradition to recognize the institution's history.

In 2020, Daemen opened the Center for Interprofessional Learning and Simulation (CILS), which has eight examination rooms, a counseling room and a space for telehealth counseling and is used by students in the university's nursing, social work, physical therapy, physician assistant studies and other programs.

== Presidents ==
Daemen has had six presidents since its founding in 1947:

1. M. Alphonse Kampshoff (1947 – 1953)
2. M. Angela Canavan (1953 – 1973)
3. Robert S. Marshall (1973 – 1996)
4. Martin J. Anisman (1996 – 2011)
5. Edwin G. Clausen (2011 – 2013)
6. Gary A. Olson (2013 – present)

The president works with an administrative council called the president's cabinet. Daemen also has a faculty senate, a student government association, and an alumni board.

The current president is Gary A. Olson. For many years during his tenure as president, he has been named one of Western New York's most influential leaders by Buffalo Business First, the region's weekly business newspaper.

== Academics ==
Daemen offers 65 academic majors and programs in a variety of disciplines and subject areas, including physical therapy, nursing, visual and performing arts, the liberal arts, business, and education. Since 2018, Daemen has been classified among "Doctoral/Professional Universities".

=== Rankings ===
Since 2007, Daemen has been named a national College of Distinction.

Daemen's paralegal studies program is currently the only American Bar Association (ABA)-approved program in Western New York.

In 2017, Daemen became the only state-approved applied behavior analysis graduate program in New York.

=== Accreditation ===
Daemen is accredited by the Middle States Commission on Higher Education.

Daemen has specific academic programs accredited by:

- International Accreditation Council for Business Education (IACBE)
- Commission on Accreditation of Athletic Training Education (CAATE)
- Accreditation Commission for Education in Nursing (ACEN)
- Commission on Accreditation in Physical Therapy Education (CAPTE)
- Accreditation Review Commission on Education for the Physician Assistant (ARC-PA)
- Commission on Accreditation, Council on Social Work Education (CSWE)

== Colleges ==
Academic programs at the university are administered in three colleges:

- The College of Arts, Science and Education houses programs and departments of education, the humanities, social sciences, visual and performing arts, and natural sciences and mathematics.
- The College of Health, Human Sciences and Business houses the programs and departments of accounting, business, paralegal studies, behavioral science, health promotion, leadership & innovation, public health, social work and sociology.
- The College of Health Professions houses the departments of athletic training, nursing, physician assistant studies, and physical therapy.

Daemen is designated as a multi-campus institution by the New York State Department of Education, in recognition of the university's campuses in Amherst and Brooklyn.

== Libraries ==
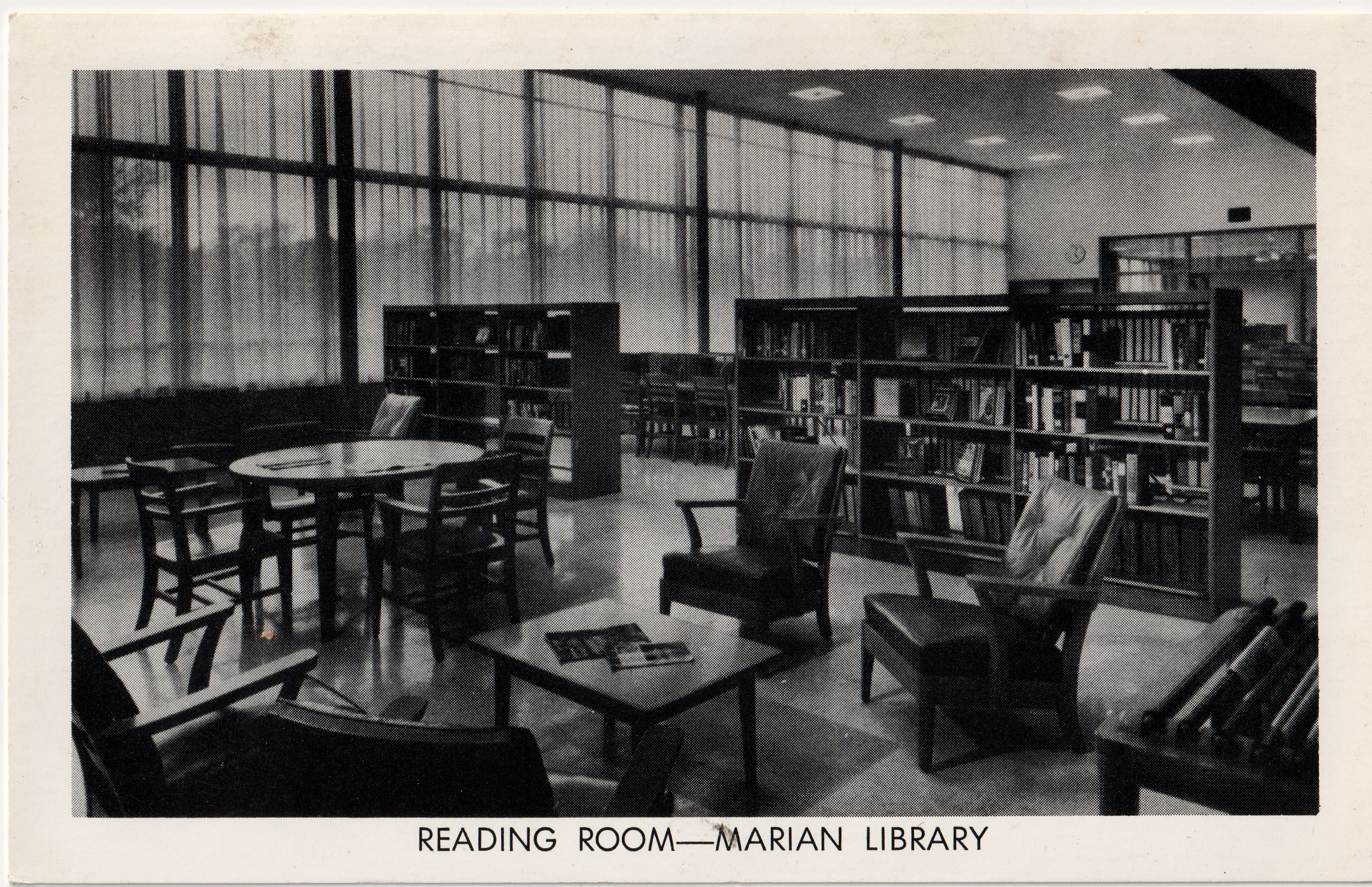
Reading room, Marian Library, Rosary Hill College, circa 1960s

The first library at Daemen was housed in Rosary Hall. In 1952, Marian Library opened and served the institution until 2008. The structure was renovated into the Nancy Haberman Gacioch, William T Gacioch & Family Center for Visual and Performing Arts in 2012.

The current Daemen library, in the Research and Information Commons (RIC), opened in 2008. The RIC manages an archival collection that includes publications, photographs, and other materials documenting the history of the university, in addition to hardcopy books, journal and media volumes and other digital titles.

== Athletics ==
The Daemen Wildcats represent Daemen in intercollegiate athletics. Daemen is a member of the East Coast Conference (ECC), competing at the NCAA Division II level. The university's official colors are royal blue, black, white, and gray.

Men's sports include basketball, cross country, volleyball, indoor and outdoor track, soccer, and tennis. Women's sports include basketball, bowling, cross country, cheerleading, indoor and outdoor track, soccer, tennis, triathlon, and volleyball. A co-ed team competes in esports.

The athletic department announced the addition of women's lacrosse beginning in 2023–24.

During his presidency, Olson has also served as chair of the NCAA Division II Presidents Council and served on the NCAA Board of Governors, and NCAA President Mark Emmert has visited campus numerous times, serving as commencement speaker and holding town-hall discussions with student-athletes.

== Housing ==
Daemen supports multiple student housing complexes and affiliations:

- Canavan Hall is a traditional five-story facility housing approximately 260 students and is primarily used as first-year and new student housing.
- Campus Apartments, housing approximately 384 students, is a complex of seven two-story apartment-style buildings providing housing typically for upperclassmen students.
- Snyder Park, which is adjacent to Daemen's Amherst campus, features apartment-style living with either single or double rooms.

Daemen also maintains a partnership with Collegiate Village, an independently operated housing complex, which typically houses upperclassmen students in two- and four-bedroom apartments.

== Media ==
A variety of student-sponsored and institutional-sponsored newspapers, magazines and periodicals have been published at Daemen.

The Summit yearbook was published from 1952 until 2012.

The Ascent student newspaper began printing in 1949 and was published until 2009. The Insight is Daemen's current student newspaper; it publishes twice a year. Daemen Today is the alumni periodical published once a year

== Traditions ==
Every fall Daemen hosts its annual Founders Celebration, which is a campus-wide event honoring the institution's origins and commemorating its history of scholarship. Events include the ringing of Founders Bell by representatives of the university, the Distinguished Alumni Awards Dinner, Daemen Day in Amherst in partnership with local businesses, key athletics events, and other student-centric events.

The university conducts white coat ceremonies for health-related degrees.

The ALHANA (African, Latinx, Hispanic, Asian, Native American) program and graduation celebrates individual student and class-wide accomplishments.

Springfest is an annual music festival hosted by the Daemen Student Government Association. Artists have included Drake.

Daemen Tradition Keepers complete a list of "50 Things to do Before You Graduate".

== Notable people ==
=== Alumni ===
- Gerald Beverly 2015, professional basketball player for Amatori Udine of the Italian Serie A2 Basket league
- Catherine A. Carey 1967, former Clerk of the New York State Assembly from 1975 to 1984
- MaryEllen Elia 1970, former New York State Education Commissioner and former superintendent of Hillsborough County Public Schools in Tampa, Florida
- Mary Ann Esposito 1964, creator/host of Ciao Italia with Mary Ann Esposito, a cooking program that is the longest-running United States television series of its kind
- Sue Falsone 1996, owns Structure & Function by Sue Falsone. She was head of athletic training and sport performance with United States men's national soccer team, the first female physical therapist in MLB and head athletic trainer for the Los Angeles Dodgers
- Liz Liddy 1966, former dean of the iSchool at Syracuse University
- Linda L. Neider 1975, professor of management at Miami Herbert Business School at the University of Miami
- Alexander Nwora, former basketball player and coach of the Erie Kats
- Samuel Ouedraogo, basketball player and member of the Burkina Faso national basketball team

=== Faculty ===
- James K.Y. Kuo, professor of art. Kuo was an abstract expressionist painter. His works are in the Albright–Knox Art Gallery and the China Institute.
