= Gary A. Olson =

American scholar, biographer and university president

6th President of Daemen University
- Incumbent
- Assumed office 2013
- Preceded by: Edwin Clausen

Personal details
- Born: December 12, 1954 (age 71)
- Education: Kings College; University of Connecticut; Indiana University of Pennsylvania
- Profession: Scholar, Biographer, and University Administrator

Gary A. Olson (born December 12, 1954) is an American scholar of rhetoric and culture, a literary biographer, and president of Daemen University. He has served as provost and vice president for academic affairs at Idaho State University, dean of the College of Arts and Sciences at Illinois State University, and chief academic officer at the University of South Florida, St. Petersburg.

Olson served as a monthly columnist on higher education administration for the Chronicle of Higher Education from February 2006 to August 2013, and he wrote for the Huffington Post on similar topics from August 2013 to May 2017.

== Career ==
Olson obtained his PhD from Indiana University of Pennsylvania in 1980. His early research at the University of Alabama and the University of North Carolina-Wilmington focused on rhetoric and writing studies.

In 1985, Olson moved to the University of South Florida and became editor of the scholarly journal JAC, moving from writing studies toward the intersections between rhetoric, ideology, culture, and literary theory. While at the University of South Florida, Olson became a full professor.

In 1991, Olson began conducting scholarly interviews of internationally prominent intellectuals including anthropologist Clifford Geertz, linguist Noam Chomsky, deconstructionist Jacques Derrida, postmodern theorist Jean-François Lyotard, philosopher of science Sandra Harding, theorist and cultural critic Donna Haraway, political philosopher Ernesto Laclau, and feminist theorist bell hooks. These interviews were published in JAC and in a series of books.

In 1994, the Council of Editors of Learned Journals presented Olson with an International Award for Distinguished Editor for his decade of work editing JAC.

In 2002, the Association for Teachers of Advanced Composition established an annual book award in Olson's name: The Gary A. Olson Award for the most outstanding book on rhetorical and cultural theory. Also in 2002, Olson became interim associate vice president for academic affairs at the University of South Florida, St. Petersburg (chief academic officer).

In 2004, he became the dean of arts and sciences at Illinois State University, where he was also professor of English and affiliate faculty in the Women's Studies department.

In 2009, Olson became provost and vice president for academic affairs at Idaho State University, where he oversaw the creation of the institution's Division of Health Sciences, its College of Science and Engineering, and its College of Arts and Letters. In 2010 Olson lost a non-binding vote of no-confidence by ISU faculty who criticized him for the reorganization plan and for not adequately addressing faculty concerns. President Arthur C. Vailas supported Olson. In June 2011 he resigned from his VP post in order to write the authorized biography of Stanley Fish.

In 2012, the Idaho Humanities Council awarded Olson a grant to help him complete the authorized biography of Stanley Fish, and Indiana University of Pennsylvania awarded him its highest honor: The Distinguished Alumni Award. He was also inducted into the Honor Society of Phi Kappa Phi, the "oldest and largest collegiate honor society dedicated to the recognition and promotion of academic excellence in all disciplines." Also in 2012, the Southeastern Writing Center Association announced an annual faculty award in Olson's name: The Gary A. Olson Scholarship. Olson founded the organization in 1980.

In 2013, Olson became president of Daemen University in Amherst, New York.

Olson is credited with leading Daemen to an upgrade in its classification by the Carnegie Classification of Institutions of Higher Education from “masters” level to “doctoral-professional university”, State of New York approval to grant the former Daemen College “university” status, and official state designation as a multi-campus university. He also led the university’s first-ever comprehensive fundraising campaign, exceeding the goal of $22 million by more than $4.5 million.

In 2014 and then again for each of the next nine years, Olson was named one of Western New York's most influential leaders by Buffalo Business First, the region's weekly business newspaper.

== Selected works ==
- Olson, Gary A. (2016). Stanley Fish, America's Enfant Terrible: The Authorized Biography. Southern Illinois University Press. ISBN 978-0-8093-3476-6.
- Olson, Gary A. (2013). A Creature of Our Own Making: Reflections on Contemporary Academic Life. State University of New York Press. ISBN 978-1-4384-4578-6.
- Olson, Gary A.; Worsham, Lynn, eds. (2012). Education as Civic Engagement: Toward a More Democratic Society. Palgrave Macmillan. ISBN 978-1-137-03369-7.
- Olson, Gary A.; Presley, John, eds. (2009). The Future of Higher Education: Perspectives from America's Academic Leaders. Paradigm Publishers. ISBN 978-1-59451-797-6.
- Worsham, Lynn; Olson, Gary A., eds. (2008). Plugged In: Technology, Rhetoric, and Culture in a Posthuman Age. Hampton Press. ISBN 978-1-57273-834-8.
- Olson, Gary A.; Worsham, Lynn, eds. (2007). The Politics of Possibility: Encountering the Radical Imagination. Paradigm Publishers. ISBN 978-1594514449.
- Olson, Gary A.; Worsham, Lynn, eds. (2004). Postmodern Sophistry: Stanley Fish and the Critical Enterprise. State University of New York Press. ISBN 978-0-7914-6213-3.
- Olson, Gary A.; Worsham, Lynn (2003). Critical Intellectuals on Writing. State University of New York Press. ISBN 978-0-7914-5842-6.
- Olson, Gary A. (2002). Justifying Belief: Stanley Fish and the Work of Rhetoric. State University of New York Press. ISBN 978-0-7914-5612-5.
- Olson, Gary A., ed. (2002). Rhetoric and Composition as Intellectual Work. Southern Illinois University Press. ISBN 978-0-8093-2433-0.
- Worsham, Lynn; Dobrin, Sidney; Olson, Gary A., eds. (2000). The Kinneavy Papers: Theory and the Study of Discourse. State University of New York Press. ISBN 978-0-7914-4692-8.
- Ashton-Jones, Evelyn; Olson, Gary A.; Perry, Merry, eds. (2000). The Gender Reader (2nd ed.). Allyn and Bacon. ISBN 978-0-205-13068-9.
- Olson, Gary A.; Worsham, Lynn (1999). Race, Rhetoric, and the Postcolonial. State University of New York Press. ISBN 978-0-7914-4174-9.
- Olson, Gary A.; Metzger, Elizabeth; Ashton-Jones, Evelyn, eds. (1989). Advanced Placement English: Theory, Politics, and Pedagogy (2nd printing ed.). Boynton/Cook. ISBN 978-0-86709-246-2.
- Olson, Gary A.; Taylor, Todd, eds. (1997). Publishing in Rhetoric and Composition. Foreword by J. Hillis Miller. State University of New York Press. ISBN 978-0-7914-3395-9.
- Olson, Gary A.; Drew, Julie, eds. (1996). Landmark Essays on Advanced Composition. Hermagoras Press. ISBN 978-1-880393-25-3.
- Olson, Gary A.; Hirsh, Elizabeth (1995). Women Writing Culture. Foreword by Donna Haraway; Afterword by Henry Giroux. State University of New York Press. ISBN 978-0-7914-2963-1.
- Olson, Gary A.; Dobrin, Sidney, eds. (1994). Composition Theory for the Postmodern Classroom. State University of New York Press. ISBN 978-0-7914-2305-9.
- Olson, Gary A. (1994). Philosophy, Rhetoric, Literary Criticism. Foreword by Clifford Geertz. Southern Illinois University Press. ISBN 978-0-8093-1908-4.
