= Sue Falsone =

American athletic trainer

- Education: Daemen College; University of North Carolina
- Occupation: Baseball athletic trainer

Sue Falsone /suː fælˈsoʊn.i/ is an American physical therapist, athletic trainer, educator, consultant, and sports performance professional. She has worked with professional athletes and sports organizations in Major League Baseball, the National Football League, international soccer, and professional basketball.

Falsone served as the Head Athletic Trainer for the Los Angeles Dodgers from 2012 to 2013, becoming the first woman to hold the position of head athletic trainer in the four major professional sports (MLB, NFL, NBA, NHL). She previously worked for the Dodgers as a team physical therapist and assistant athletic trainer beginning in 2007.

Her career has focused on sports rehabilitation, injury prevention, movement assessment, return-to-play and return-to-performance programming, and integration of medical and performance services. She is the founder of Structure & Function Education and Sue Falsone Consulting.

== Early life ==
Falsone grew up in Buffalo, New York, attending high school at Kenmore West Senior High School. She earned Bachelor of Science degree in physical therapy with a minor in Biology from Daemen College in Amherst, New York, in 1996, graduating cum laude. She later earned a Master of Science degree in Human Movement Science with a concentration in Sports Medicine from the University of North Carolina at Chapel Hill in 2000. Her master's thesis examined the reliability and application of the one-arm hop test and its relationship to the upper-extremity dominance, athletic group, isokinetic testing, and anthropometric variables.

She subsequently earned a Doctor of Physical Therapy degree from Daemen College, receiving an honorary Doctor of Physical Therapy degree from the institution in 2021.

== Early Career ==
Falsone began her clinical career in outpatient orthopedic physical therapy. She worked at Pro-Active Therapy in North Carolina, treating orthopedic and sports-related injuries, and later worked at Dynasplint Systems, where she treated patients with range-of-motion deficits across orthopedic, pediatric, geriatric, and neurological populations.

While completing her graduate studies at the University of North Carolina, she worked as a graduate assistant in athletic training, covering football, women's basketball, and rowing and providing evaluation and rehabilitation services to injured athletes.

She also worked as an assistant athletic trainer for the University of North Carolina women's basketball program.

== Athlete's Performance ==
In 2001, Falsone joined Athletes' Performance, where she eventually became vice president of Performance Physical Therapy and Team Sports.

She helped develop the physical therapy component of an integrated performance-training system for professional and elite athletes.

Her clinical work focused on prehabilitation, rehabilitation, injury reduction, and the transition from rehabilitation to athletic performance. She worked with professional and elite athletes in sports including Major League Baseball, the National Football League, the National Basketball Association, the National Hockey League, the Women's Tennis Association, and professional golf.

Falsone also developed rehabilitation mentorship and continuing-education programs. Her work increasingly emphasized the integration of rehabilitation and performance rather than treating them as separate stages of an athlete's development.

== Los Angeles Dodgers ==
=== Physical Therapist and Assistant Athletic Trainer ===
Falsone joined the Los Angeles Dodgers in October 2007 as a team physical therapist and assistant athletic trainer for the Major League club.

She remained with the organization through 2010 and returned as a consultant in 2011.

=== Head Athletic Trainer ===
In 2012, Falsone became the Dodgers' head athletic trainer and physical therapist.

Her appointment represented a milestone in professional sports medicine, making her the first woman to serve as a head athletic trainer in the four major professional sports (MLB, NFL, NBA, NHL).

She served in the position during the 2012 and 2013 seasons before leaving the Dodgers in 2013.

== United States Men's National Soccer Team ==
From October 2014 to October 2015, Falsone served as Head of Athletic Training and Sport Performance for the United States Men's National Soccer Team under the direction of Jürgen Klinsmann.

== Consulting and Professional Sports ==
Following her work with the national soccer team, Falsone expanded her consulting activities in professional sports and rehabilitation.

In 2014 she founded Sue Falsone Consulting, providing rehabilitation, performance, and transition training for professional and elite athletes. The company also provides consulting to teams and organizations seeking to integrate physical therapy and performance training and develop unified medical and performance staffs.

She worked with the Milwaukee Bucks as a consultant in 2018, collaborating with medical and coaching staff on an individualized plan of care and integration of medical and strength programs with on-court performance goals.

Her consulting and educational work has also included involvement with numerous professional sports organizations, including teams from the NBA, NFL, MLS, Major League Baseball, and international soccer.

== Houston Texans ==
From March 2022 through March 2024, Falsone served as Director of Movement and Return to Performance for the Houston Texans.

== Return to the Los Angeles Dodgers ==
Falsone returned to the Dodgers organization as a consultant from 2024 to 2025.

=== Senior Advisor ===
Beginning in 2025, Falsone became Senior Advisor with the Los Angeles Dodgers.

Her current work focuses in part on the return-to-performance process, collaborating across medical, sports science, coaching and performance disciplines to help injured athletes transition from rehabilitation back to competitive performance.

== Structure & Function Education ==
In 2016, Falsone founded Structure & Function Education (S&F), an education company focused on bridging the gap between rehabilitation and performance. Its curriculum includes continuing education for healthcare professionals, including dry-needling education.

Falsone has developed and taught courses in dry needling, intramuscular stimulation, movement assessment, rehabilitation, injury prevention, and sports performance.

Among the courses she developed are Foundations in Dry Needling for Orthopedic Rehab and Sport Performance and Advanced Dry Needling for Orthopedic Rehab and Sport Performance. These courses teach dry needling and intramuscular stimulation and are taught at locations throughout the United States.

She also developed a four-day, 25-hour anatomical dissection course focused on fresh-frozen cadaver anatomy and considerations for dry-needling safety.

Structure & Function Education partnered with the Stecco Institute in 2019 to bring the Fascial Manipulation Method by Stecco to the US. Falsone created an online education platform for Structure & Function Education in 2020, developing and co-developing courses related to dry needling and the transition from rehabilitation to performance. In 2022, she partnered with Shawn Robek and Fix Body Medical to bring joint manipulation classes to the company. These additions to the Structure & Function Education portfolio have made S&F one of the leading educators in the US for dry needling and manual therapy techniques, offering a full curriculum for both in person and online education.

== Academic Career ==
Falsone served as an Associate Professor in the Athletic Training Department at A.T. Still University of Health Sciences from 2016 to 2026. Her primary teaching responsibilities included musculoskeletal courses within the Doctor of Athletic Training program. She has also served on the university's Faculty Affairs Committee and Artificial Intelligence Committee.

Her earlier academic teaching has included adjunct and guest-lecturing positions at A.T. Still University, Midwestern University, Northern Arizona University, and other institutions.

== Research and Publications ==
Falsone has contributed to peer-reviewed research and professional publications in sports medicine, physical therapy, athletic training, and rehabilitation.

Her publications and research contributions include work on dry needling, sport performance, athletic training, movement and rehabilitation.

Her publications include articles in the Journal of Orthopaedic & Sports Physical Therapy, American Journal of Sports Medicine, International Journal of Sports Physical Therapy, Journal of Sport Rehabilitation, Journal of Athletic Training, Scientific Reports, and other professional journals.

== Books and Educational Publications ==
In addition to her own full length- book Bridging the Gap from Rehab to Performance, published in 2018, Falsone has contributed chapters to several professional books and educational publications.

Her contributions include chapters in:

- Work Life Imbalance: Evaluating Work Cultures as Women in Leadership (2021)
- Movers and Mentors: Leaders in Movement Science Share Tips, Tactics and Stories
- Musculoskeletal Interventions, 4th edition
- Sports Neurology, Volume 158 of the Handbook of Clinical Neurology
- Functional Training Handbook
- High-Performance Training for Sports
- The Athletes Shoulder, 2nd edition

== Teaching and Professional Presentations ==
Falsone has been a frequent lecturer, instructor, and keynote speaker at professional conferences in the United States and internationally.

Her presentations have addressed rehabilitation and return to performance, dry needling, sports medicine, movement assessment, injury prevention, strength and conditioning, the throwing athlete, shoulder and spine rehabilitation, and integration of medical and performance teams.

She has also presented internationally in countries including Japan, South Korea, England, Brasil, Argentia, Germany, Israel, Thailand, Canada, Spain and Taiwan.

== Professional Credentials ==
Falsone's professional credentials include:

- Physical Therapist
- Board Certified Clinical Specialist in Sports Physical Therapy
- Certified Athletic Trainer
- Certified Strength and Conditioning Specialist with Distinction
- Certified Orthopedic Manual Therapist
- Registered Yoga Teacher
- Certified Adult Mental Health First Aid provider

== Professional Service and Honor ==
Falsone has served as a reviewer or editorial-board member for several professional journals, including the International Journal of Athletic Therapy & Training, Journal of Shoulder and Elbow Surgery, International Journal of Sports Physical Therapy, and Journal of Sport Rehabilitation.

She has also served in advisory roles for organizations including Nike, the University of North Carolina Physical Therapy program, Performance Health, and Kabuki Strength.

Her honors include:

- 2025 Distinguished Fellow of the Athletic Training Academy, National Academies of Practice
- 2021 Honorary Doctor of Physical Therapy, Daemen College
- 2021 Daemen College Convocation keynote speaker
- 2021 Daemen College Physical Therapy Dept graduation speaker
- 2019 ICCUS Society induction
- 2012 Kenmore West Senior High School Athletic Hall of Fame induction
- 2009 Awarded Distinguished Alumni, Daemen College
