= James K.Y. Kuo =

- 郭光遠
- Born: December 25, 1920
- Died: January 20, 1995 (aged 74)
- Occupations: Painter; Educator
- Years active: 1947-1995

James K.Y. Kuo (Chinese: 郭光遠; December 25, 1920 – January 20, 1995) was a Chinese-born painter who came to the United States in 1947. Kuo was known as a "lyrical abstract painter...who exhibited his work at the Albright-Knox Art Gallery," the China Institute and the Elliott Museum and taught for many years at Daemen College in Amherst, New York.

== Early life ==
With encouragement from his father, Kuo studied traditional Chinese painting at the Suzhou Art & Design Technology Institute in Suzhou, China, and also at the Anqing School of Art, Anqing, Anhui, China. A direct inheritor of ink painting traditions, he left the political upheavals of China and emigrated to the US in 1947 and received his Masters of Fine Art in painting at the University of Missouri, Columbia, MO, in 1949.

== Career ==
An "abstract-expressionist artist, painter, ceramicist/sculptor, jewelry maker, lecturer and respected teacher, he was primarily known for his paintings in acrylic, acrylic collage, gouache collage, watercolor and applied copper or silver on mediums such as; brass, textured nickel & wood. Early on, Kuo was influenced by Shih-t'ao and Chu Ta, the "Individualists" who became monks in 17th Century China as well as by the American abstract expressionists Franz Kline, Mark Rothko and Willem de Kooning. His bold brush strokes of flat muted colors could be very abstract but never far from the natural world.

He later taught at Rosary Hill College (now Daemen College), as Professor Emeritus, Amherst, NY, from 1955 to 1992.

== Personal life ==
His daughter Nina Kuo is also an artist.

== Exhibitions ==
- Members Gallery, Albright-Knox Art Gallery, Buffalo, NY
- China Institute, New York, NY
- Chautauqua Institute, Chautauqua, NY
- Burchfield Penney Art Center, Buffalo
- Gallery Without Walls, Buffalo
- More-Rubin Gallery, Buffalo
- Daemen College, Buffalo
- Elliott Museum, Stuart, FL
- University of Missouri, Columbia, MO
- Birchfield Penney Art Center, SUNY Buffalo State

== Collections ==
- Montclair Art Museum, Montclair, NJ
- China Institute, New York, NY
- Burchfield Penney Art Center, Buffalo, NY
- Albright-Knox Art Gallery, Buffalo, NY
- Gary Snyder Fine Arts, New York, NY
