= Justifying Belief =

Justifying Belief: Stanley Fish and the Work of Rhetoric is a book written by Gary A. Olson in which he examines in depth the non-literary works of Stanley Fish, a critic of 17th century literature.

== Summary ==
The book begins with an analysis of Fish's perspective on English studies as an academic discipline, as developed in Professional Correctness: Literary Studies and Political Change. Chapter 2 examines a principal argument in Fish's writings: that general principles cannot inform specific practice. Olson then explores Fish's contention that rhetoric underlies epistemology. Chapter 4 is the transcript of an interview with Fish that Olson conducted in 1991. Chapter 5 is a transcript of an interview with Fish that Olson conducted in 2000. In them, Fish explores reaffirms his conviction that rhetoric is the “necessary center” of epistemology.

== Foreword and afterword ==
J. Hillis Miller contributes an afterword to the book in which he reflects on Fish's work and its contribution to contemporary understandings of the interrelationships among rhetoric, epistemology, and belief. Fish himself contributes a foreword.

== Bibliography ==
The book includes a comprehensive bibliography of Fish's works.

== Critical reception ==
A number of scholars have cited and analyzed the contribution of Justifying Belief to rhetorical and literary scholarship. In College Literature, Thomas West praises Justifying Belief’s exclusive focus on Fish's nonliterary work and its clear explanation of how it articulates a postmodern, antifoundational philosophical position.

A Canadian scholar, Greg Maillet, writing in Religion and Literature, judges Justifying Belief to be an informative explication of Fish's antifoundationalist rhetoric. Ulf Schulenberg, a scholar at the University of Bremen in Germany, writes in American Studies that Justifying Belief is a clear explication of Fish's theoretical work, although he criticizes Olson for focusing only on certain representative texts of Fish, and for not being critical of other aspects of Fish's work.
