= Toshio Aoki =

Japanese artist

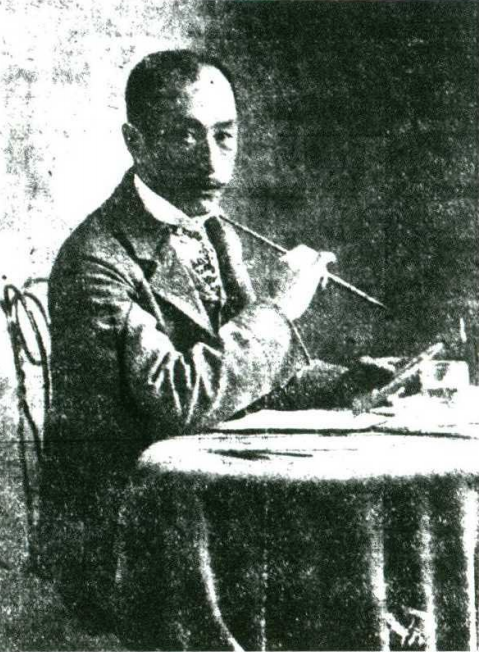
Toshio Aoki, ca. 1907

Toshio Aoki or Tershui Aoki (青木年雄 Aoki Toshio, born 1854, in Yokohama, Japan – 1912, in San Diego, California) was a Japanese American artist and painter who lived and worked in California at the turn of the 20th century.

Aoki found significant success among the American upper class and was known for hosting social events. Guests of his are alleged to have included John D. Rockefeller and J. P. Morgan.

Aoki was born in Yokohama, Japan in 1854. He emigrated to San Francisco in 1880 at the invitation of a department store owner. Upon his arrival, he began work as a commercial artist for the Deakin Brothers of San Francisco. He also worked as a cartoon illustrator for a San Francisco newspaper.

Eventually, he became one of the preeminent Japanese artists working in the United States. He later relocated to Pasadena, California, where he received commissions to decorate the interiors of Arts and Crafts houses whose architecture, such as the famed residences by Greene and Greene, often reflected Japanese aesthetics.

During this time, he was also featured in an article by the Los Angeles Herald, entitled "To See Yourselves As Aoki Sees You" which indicated that he had already gained prominence. He was active until 1910 and died in San Diego on April 26, 1912.

Aoki painted portraits and murals in the homes of prominent people and became very successful. His works were handled by George T. Marsh & Company. He exhibited at the World’s Columbian Exposition in Chicago in 1893, and the Art Institute of Chicago gave him a showing in 1924.

The Fine Arts Gallery of San Francisco State University said of him: "Much of Aoki's early life in Japan is speculation, ranging from artistic pursuits (student of acting, or street artist) to the grand and spectacular (a Samurai opposed to the new Japanese government). . . . [he painted] 'spontaneous seki'e ('on the spot' or 'before the viewers' eyes'). He built a reputation as a storyteller, sketching comical figures and eventually landing an illustrating job with the San Francisco Call."

After moving to Pasadena, Aoki "worked hard to shed his reputation as an amusing character and storyteller and to be taken seriously as an artist. He began to work on 'Oriental receptions,' creating an atmosphere of a Japanese masquerade ball."

Not much is known about Aoki's personal life and marriage; however, he is known to have adopted a 7-year-old girl named Tsuru, who later became an actress. While he was based in Pasadena, Aoki also maintained a studio in San Francisco where he first met Tsuru and her original guardians. He died on June 26, 1912.

== Biography ==
Toshio Aoki was born in 1854 in Yokohama, Japan. Not much is known about his early life, but he emigrated to the United States around 1880 with in a department store as a commercial artist when Japonisme took prominence during the era. It is unknown on how long he worked under the Deakin Brothers, as he worked for other establishments making decorative works and commissions, then working with G.T. Marsh in 1895 during his time in Pasadena for commercial ventures. Achieving success in California through Nihonga, he created works that utilized Japanese imagery such as deities and icons from the Meiji period. Aoki created works in multiple media, some of which include oil on canvas and Japanese water-soluble media. He was also known as a performer, hosting a cherry blossom dinner at Pasadena where J.P. Morgan and John D. Rockefeller participated, as well as a craftsman due to his works of hand painted parasols and clothing sought out by the governor of Colorado and the vice president of the United States. Though he spent most of his life in San Diego, California, he made work in Pasadena during his later years due to social and economic limitations for the Asian exports. Though known for his involvement in Japonisme art, he wasn't given positive recognition in his home country due to the racial obstacles he faced in America, being considered as a street performer in 1908 when working for G.T. Marsh. Not much is known about his personal life aside from his marriage and divorce from a Caucasian woman during his early years in America and his adoption of Tsuru Aoki. At 1898, Aoki met Tsuru and her guardians, raising her as they faced financial difficulty in California, using his career to provide for her boarding school at Colorado Springs.

== Gallery ==
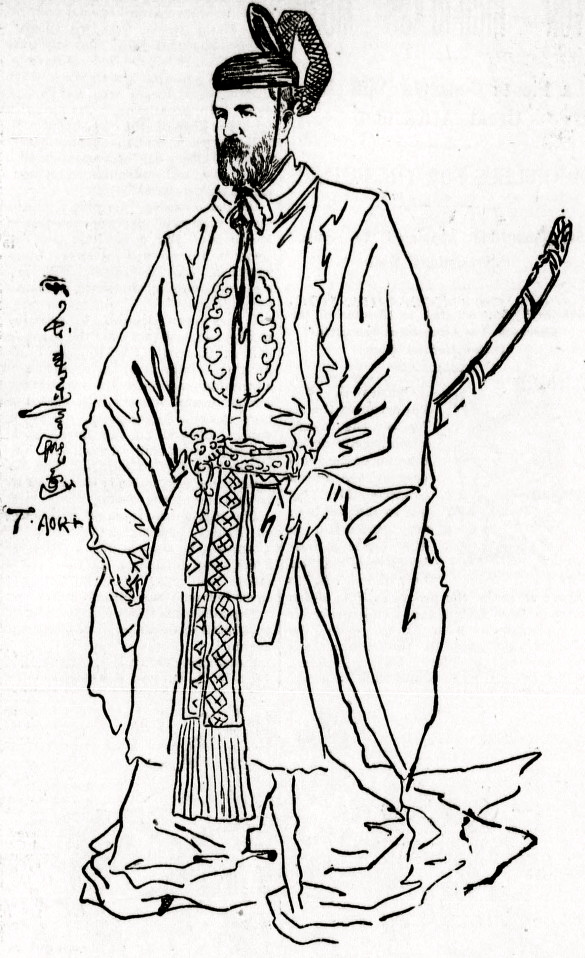
Drawing of Daniel Freeman, 1895

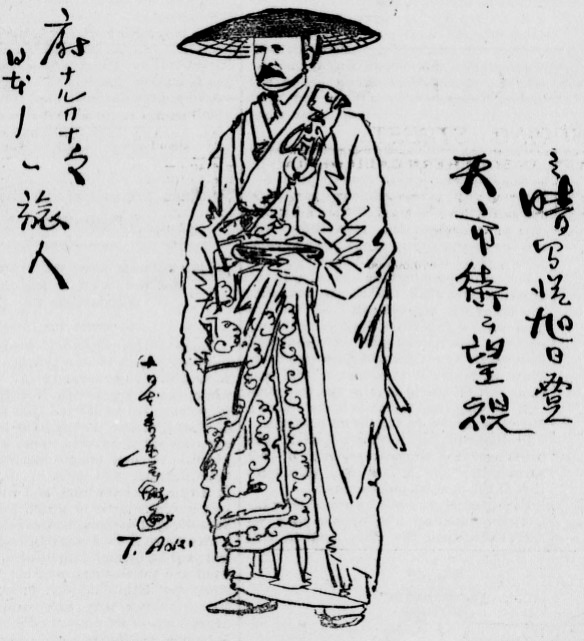
Sketch of Henry T. Hazard, 1895

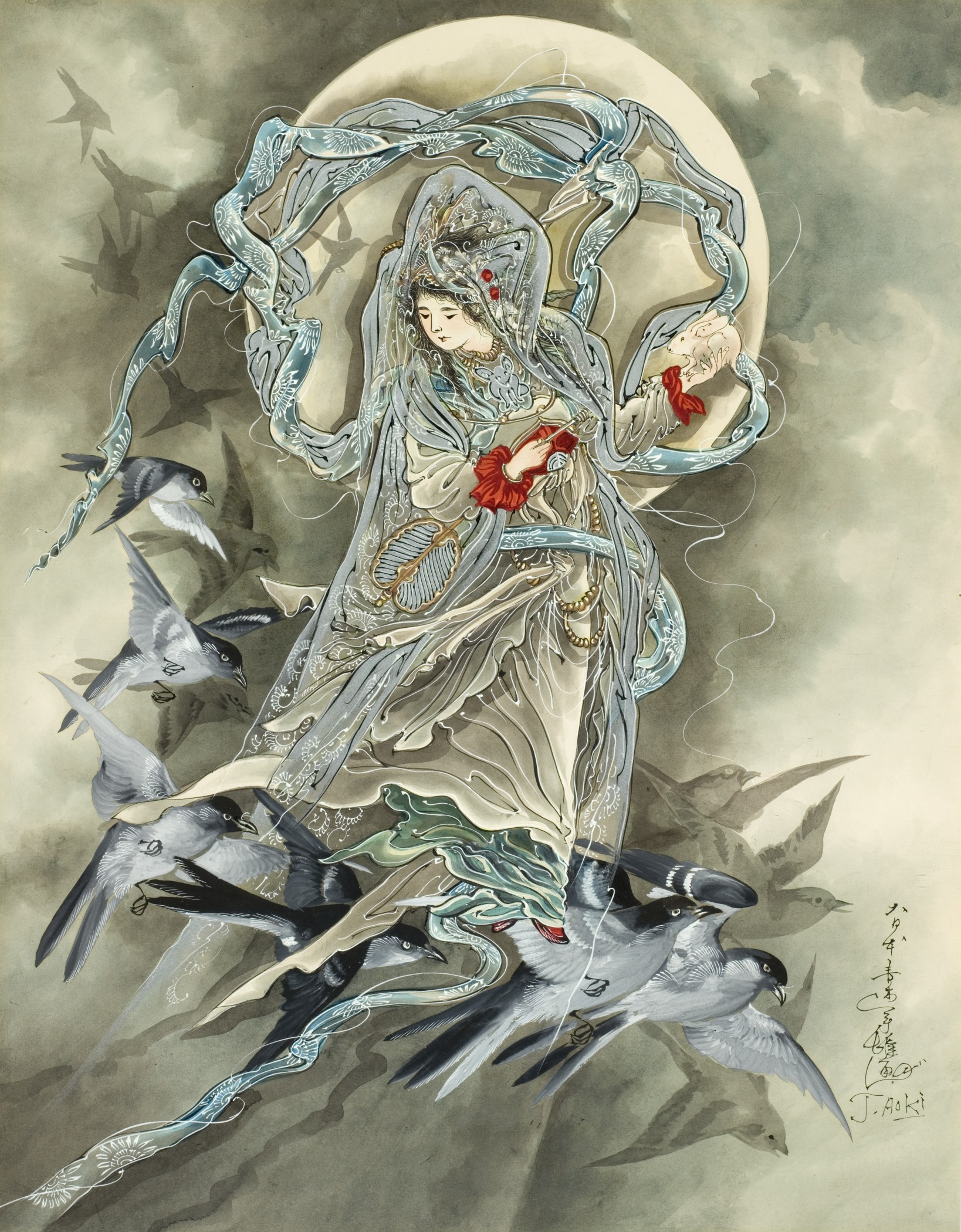
Woman with Birds, 1890s

== See also ==
- Japonisme
- Nihonga
- Tsuru Aoki
