= Jan Frank =

Dutch-American painter

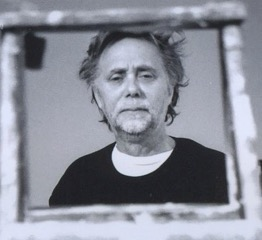
Jan frank by Lev Schulman

Jan Frank (born 1951) is a Dutch-American artist-curator based in Manhattan.

== Early life and education ==
Frank was born in Amsterdam, Netherlands, and grew up in various places around the world, including the Congo and later the American mid-west. His father was a sea captain who ran KLM Cargo. He attended the University of Wisconsin-Madison in the early 1970s. He studied ceramics under potter Don Reitz. Frank completed an Independent Study Program at the Whitney Museum, where he worked with founder Ron Clark with whom he collaborated on several films of the period.

== Career ==
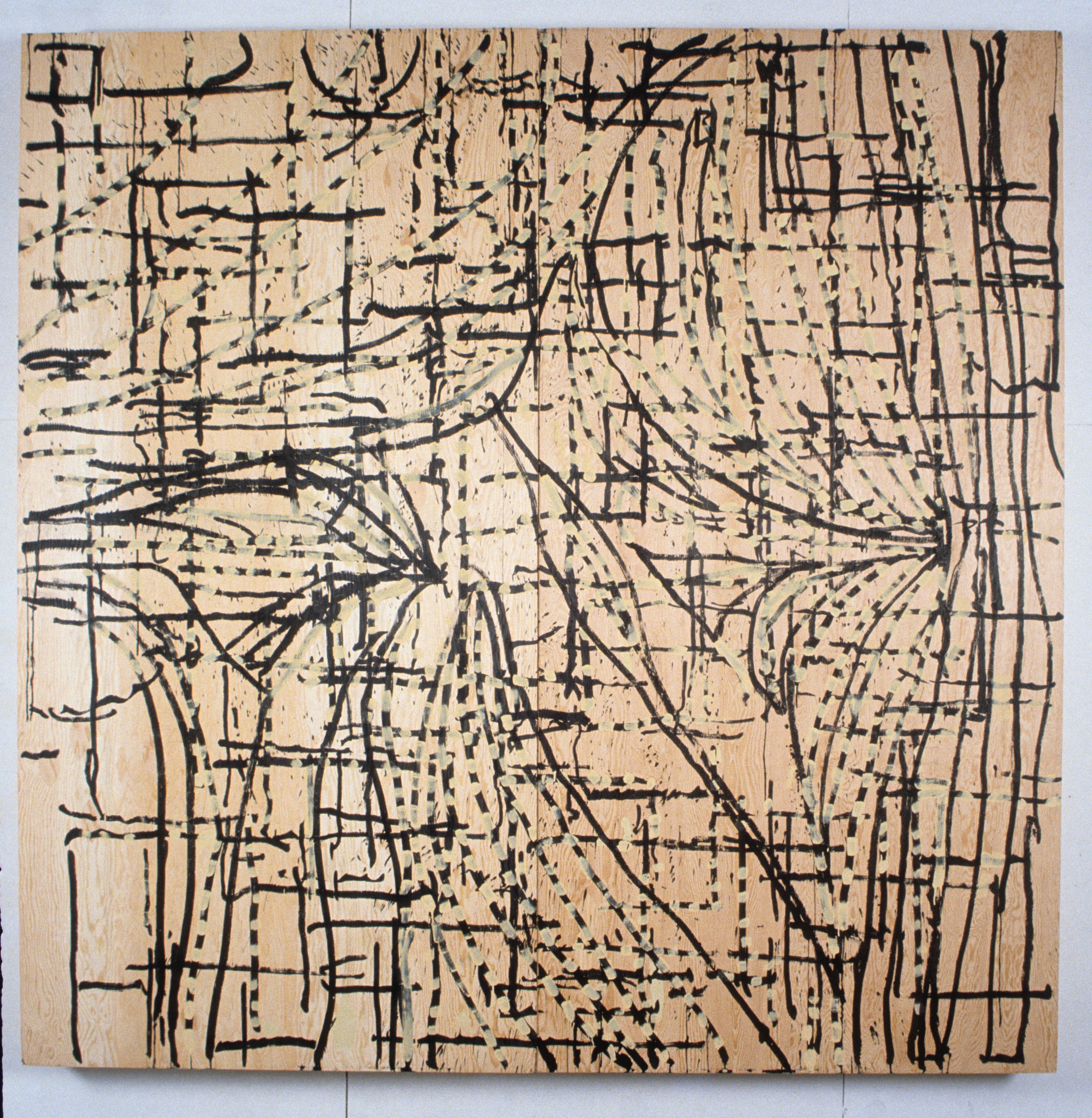
Lucky Eight oil, ink and ALKYD on Wood 1994

Frank moved to downtown New York in 1975 and has lived there in the same loft ever since. As an art student his first works were large scale Photo Realist paintings. By the time of his first exhibitions in New York he was creating installations of video-sculpture. In the 1990s Frank developed 'Xerox' drawings and plywood 'appropriation' paintings, influenced by artists De Kooning, Phillip Guston, and Louise Bourgeois. This was followed by a series of works based on abstracted motifs drawn from Nixon and Kissinger, the latter politician being photographed by Steve Pyke.

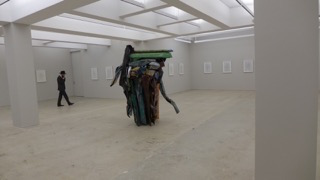
Installation shot, Nahmad Contemporary 2015

Since 2000 Frank has concentrated on creating abstract drawings and large-scale paintings, based on or extrapolated from the nude female form. Frank worked with John Chamberlain to create a large suite of drawings, which were exhibited, along with sculpture by Chamberlain, at Nahmad Contemporary in New York in the summer of 2014. Most recently, Glenn O'Brien curated a painting show of Frank's at Nahmad Contemporary featuring work from the past 25 years.

=== Curator ===
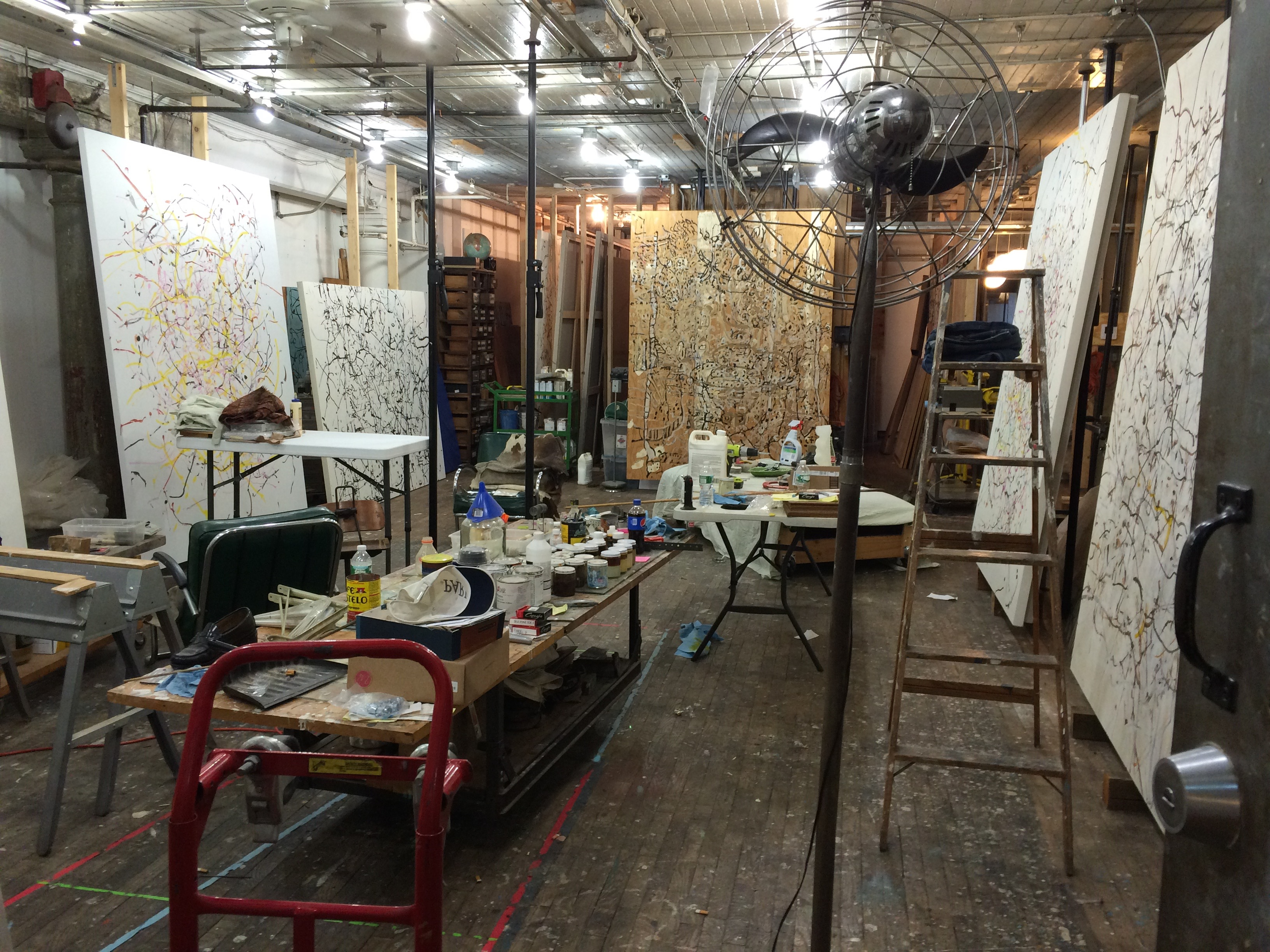
Studio Bond NYC 2015

Frank has collaborated artists Norman Bluhm, George Sugarman and Robert Stanley, with whom he originated various two-person shows. Frank has also organized exhibitions including a series of shows at the Billy Lee Thompson (BLT) gallery on the Bowery, with artists Herb Brown and Françoise Gilot. At BLT Frank also co-curated Wiser Than God, an exhibition of practicing artists aged 83 and over. Most recently he curated several exhibitions at Whitebox Art Center in New York including a retrospective of painter Hyman Bloom's rabbinical paintings.

== Exhibitions and collections ==
Frank has exhibited with the Fodor-Stedelijk, the Whitney and the Palacio de Bellas Artes in Mexico. His first solo show in New York was held at the Kitchen in 1977 curated by Robert Longo. and Carlota Schoolman. Frank has been represented by and worked with galleries including Salvatore Ala, Danese, Valeria Belvedere, Steven Vail, Postmasters, Jörg Paal, Paul Kasmin, Tim Olsen in Sydney the Merchant's House in Amsterdam, and Nahmad Contemporary Gallery in New York City

== Bibliography ==
- Give My Regards to Eighth Street – Morton Feldman Collected Writings. Ed. B.H. Friedman ( ISBN 1-878972-31-6-page V11 )
- Jan Frank; The Plywood Paintings 1993–1998 Glenn O'Brien and Raphael Rubinstein, 2013, 80p. ( ISBN 978-90-821283-0-7)
- Jan Frank: Paintings Catalogue, 2017 Nahmad Gallery, 56p. ( ISBN 978-0-9903731-7-9)
- Lacanian ink Cover Article, by Josefina Ayerza, 2017, 152p. ( ISSN 1049-7749)
- Crushed: Gangster of love Catalogue, Nahmad Contemporay, Bearrun, 2016, 94p. ( ISBN 978-90-821283-1-4)
- Suicide Catalogue, 2017, Bearrun, 22p. ( ISBN 978-0-692-84961-3)
