= Yohanna Roa =

Yohanna M. Roa
- Born: 1987 (age 38–39)
- Notable work: Mujer Textil; Pocahontas and La Malinche; The Past, Instructions for Usage: Imbrications and Erratas
- Movement: Feminist
- Awards: Barbara Deming Memorial Fund; Liu Shiming Art Foundation Grant
- Website: yohannamroa.net

Yohanna M. Roa (born 1987) is an transcultural, New York-based visual artist, art critic, curator, and art historian. She studied visual arts at Instituto Departamental de Bellas Artes, and moved to New York. Roa's work is held at the Tlatelolco Cultural Center in Mexico City. Roa has worked as a curator at the Museo Universitario Arte Contemporáneo, La Tertulia Museum, Laboratorio Arte Alameda, Banco de la República Colombia, and WhiteBox NYC. She writes for ArtNexus and WhiteHot Magazine.

Roa's art is intersectional and feminist, based in her concept of "activist fabrics". She uses traditionally feminine and domestic media, such as embroidery and crochet, to critique social hierarchies and narratives. In 2024, Roa presented Pocahontas and La Malinche at the Thyssen-Bornemisza Museum in Madrid, which explored the lives of La Malinche and Pocahontas from a feminist and decolonial perspective. She has served as a juror for the Wienwoche Festival of Art and Activism, the Barbara Deming Memorial Fund, and the Liu Shiming Art Foundation Grants. Roa's 2025 New York exhibition, Lessons to Understand Art History, featured textile interventions in canonical art history books.

== Education ==
She earned a bachelor's degree in Visual Arts from the Instituto Departamental de Bellas Artes. She later obtained a degree from the National Autonomous University of Mexico and subsequently moved to New York, where she completed a degree in Women and Gender Studies at the City University of New York. Roa holds a Ph.D. in History and Critical Theories of Art from Universidad Iberoamericana in Mexico.

== Artistic practice ==
Roa's work explores the intersection of textile craft, gender, and collective memory. Using embroidery, crochet, and sewing as artistic media, she reinterprets archives and women's histories to address social hierarchies and cultural identity. Her project Mujer Textil (Textile Woman) was analyzed by art critic Natalia de la Rosa in Casa del Tiempo (Universidad Autónoma Metropolitana), situating the work within Latin American feminist textile art. The work was also featured by the 2022 Bienal de Mujeres en las Artes Visuales (Bienal MAV).

== Exhibitions and performances ==
Her solo exhibition Lessons to Understand Art History was presented at WhiteBox NYC in 2025, featuring textile interventions into canonical art history books.

In 2024, Roa presented Pocahontas and La Malinche at the Thyssen-Bornemisza Museum in Madrid, which explored the lives of La Malinche and Pocahontas from a feminist and decolonial perspective. Pocahontas and La Malinche, was also, the Kaluz Museum in Mexico City, She also presented two performances Políticas de la ropa: Cuerpo, archivo y poder at the Museo de Arte Contemporáneo y de las Culturas Oaxaqueñas in 2024. She participated in the 2024 group exhibition at C24 Gallery in New York City, which was reviewed by William Eckhardt Kohler on New York art website Two Coats of Paint.

Roa has taken part in institutional initiatives such as the Noche de Museos program at the Laboratorio Arte Alameda, organized by the Instituto Nacional de Bellas Artes (INBA), and in 2025 her archival work was recognized by CENIDIAP for recovering women protagonists in Mexican art. In 2023 she received the Vance Waddell Artist Residency at Wave Pool Gallery in Cincinnati for her project The New Historiographic Atlas: Documents and Portraits. In 2025, Roa received the Janet Langsam Vault Project award.

== Collections ==
Roa's work is included in the permanent collection of the Centro Cultural Universitario Tlatelolco (CCUT) at the National Autonomous University of Mexico (UNAM). Her installation Calihitic, Inside the Womb of the House was featured as part of the CCUT collection in the exhibition Renombrar el mundo: Expediciones botánicas en la Nueva España, which was reviewed by Art Nexus.

== Curatorial and academic activity ==
Roa has curated and written on feminist art. Her curatorial work was reviewed in "Whitehot Magazine of Contemporary Art" by Erin L. McCutcheon, PhD. Her work has been discussed in academic forums such as the College Art Association's (CAA) annual conference in 2021, where art historian Karen_Cordero_Reiman, presented the paper Revaluing Feminine Trajectories and Stitching Alternative Genealogies in the Work of Yohanna Roa. Cordero analyzed how The Past, Instructions for Usage: Imbrications and Erratas used cut-up books of canonical works of art that excluded female creators as a medium for new pieces created with the domestic sewing techniques passed down from Roa's grandmother.

She has served as a grant juror for the Wienwoche Festival of Art and Activism, the Barbara Deming Memorial Fund, and the Liu Shiming Art Foundation Grants.

== Critical reception ==
Roa's practice has been discussed in critical panels and publications by scholars, including Karen Cordero Reiman and Natalia de la Rosa. Her work has also been the subject of a public roundtable at the Centro Cultural Universitario Tlatelolco (2025), featuring curators Sofía Carrillo, Rocío Cárdenas Pacheco, and Lucía Sánchez.
