= Asian American art =

Art is a popular form of expression within the Asian American community and can be seen as a way for the community to push against tradition. Common forms of art are painting or photography and the first known record or Asian American art was in 1854, in the form of a photography studio by Ka Chau entitled "Daguerrean Establishment". Performance art became a popular form of expression by the 1960s, allowing artists like Linda Nishio to focus on issues of representation and self-image. Music is also used as a form of expression within the Asian American community.

Popular Asian American artists include Mary Tape, Tishio Aoki, Ching Ho Cheng, and Sessue Hayakawa.

== Performance art ==
Performance art is an art form that expands on the natural form of stage performance or Theater. It gives the performers/artists to explore elements that are only glanced at. Martha Graham is one of the most regularly mentioned when it comes to Performance Art in a more abstract manner. Asian American Artists like Winston Tong also went into this medium, except with an avant- gaerde approach. In the 21st century, the realm has expanded in boundaries and responses from them the viewers/audience. University of Illinois at Chicago art student was arrested during his street performance because his outfit brought cioun to the viewers, assuming he was one of the killer clowns roaming in 2016.

== Asian American Artist History ==
In 1863, Earliest documentation of La Yong operating a portrait painting studio at 659 Clay Street, San Francisco. He moves to 743 Washington Street in 1871 and is listed as both a portrait painter and a photographer.

In 1870, Lai Yong drafts The Chinese Question, from a Chinese Standpoint with four other Chinese men, including Ah Yup (see 1878). Statement is translated and read before the San Francisco Board of Supervisors in May by Reverend O. Gibson.

In 1875, Tameya Kagi arrives in San Francisco. Tameya Kagi becomes the apprentice to Juan (James) Buckingham Wandesforde (former first president of the San Francisco Art Association). Tameya Kagi is listed as "portrait painter" in 1880 census. His work from this time also includes still lifes and landscapes.

In 1883, Tameya Kagi exhibits in the Mechanics' Institute exhibition in San Francisco.

In 1884, Theodore Wores teaches Western-style art to group of twelve Chinese students in San Fran cisco. One young student, Ah Gai, nicknamed Aiphonse." works as Woress studio assistant and often accompanies Wores as a translator during sketching trips in Chinatown (possibly as early as 1881).

Tameya Kagi exhibits for a second year in the annual Mechanics Institute exhibition and also participates in the San Francisco Art Association exhibition.

In 1903, Moriye Ogihara attends New York Art School. He will also study at the Art Students League in New York.

In 1904, Henry Yoshitaka Kiyama arrives in San Fran-cisco; he begins classes at the San Francisco Institute of Art in 1910.

In 1935, Chinese Art Association and Japanese Artists of San Francisco groups participate in pageant for the Parilia, Artists' Ball of the San Francisco Art Association.

The San Francisco Museum of Art opens. Artists in inaugural exhibition include David P. Chun, Jade Fon Woo, Miki Hayakawa, Dong Kingman, Kiyoo Harry Nobuyuki, Koichi Nomiyama, Ken-jiro Nomura, Yajiro Okamoto, Henry Sugimoto, Takeo Edward Terada, Kamekichi Tokita, and Yoshida Sekido.

Takeo Edward Terada returns to Japan, where he continues to work as a successful artist until his death in 1993.

Isamu Noguchi creates his first set design for Martha Graham's Frontier, beginning a three-decade-long collaborative relationship.

Chinese Art Association of America opens first exhibition at the de Young Museum. Exhibiting artists include Eva Fong Chan, David P. Chun, Hon Chew Hee, Hu Wai Kee, Nanying Stella Wong, and Suey B. Wong

In 1964, Tseng Yuho completes multi-panel mural composed of abstract studies of redwood trees for the Golden West Savings and Loan Association in San Francisco.

Cheng Yet-por immigrates to San Francisco.

Nam June Paik makes first visit to New York.36

George Miyasaki receives a John Simon Guggenheim Fellowship to study in Paris; when he returns to California, he begins teaching at the University of California, Berkeley.

Masami Teraoka begins four years of study at the Otis Art Institute.

Yoko Ono's influential, conceptual art book, Grapefruit, is published.

Martin Wong studies privately under Dorr Both-well in Mendocino before attending Humboldt State University.

== Organizations and places supporting Asian American art ==
- Asian American Arts Alliance
- Asian American Arts Centre
- Chinese American Museum
- Chinese American Museum of Chicago
- CAAM ( Center for Asian American Media )
- FilAm ARTS
- Kearny Streets Workshops
- Museum of Chinese in America
- Tuesday Night Project
- Vietnamese American Arts & Letters Association
- Visual Communication
- Wing Luke Museum of The Asian Pacific American Experience
- Asian American Arts Foundation
- Grantmakers in the Arts
- Pearl River Mart

== See also ==
- Asian Americans in arts and entertainment
- Smithsonian American Art Museum
- Asian American Arts Centre
