= Flushing Town Hall =

Performing arts center in Queens, New York

- U.S. National Register of Historic Places
- New York State Register of Historic Places
- New York City Landmark
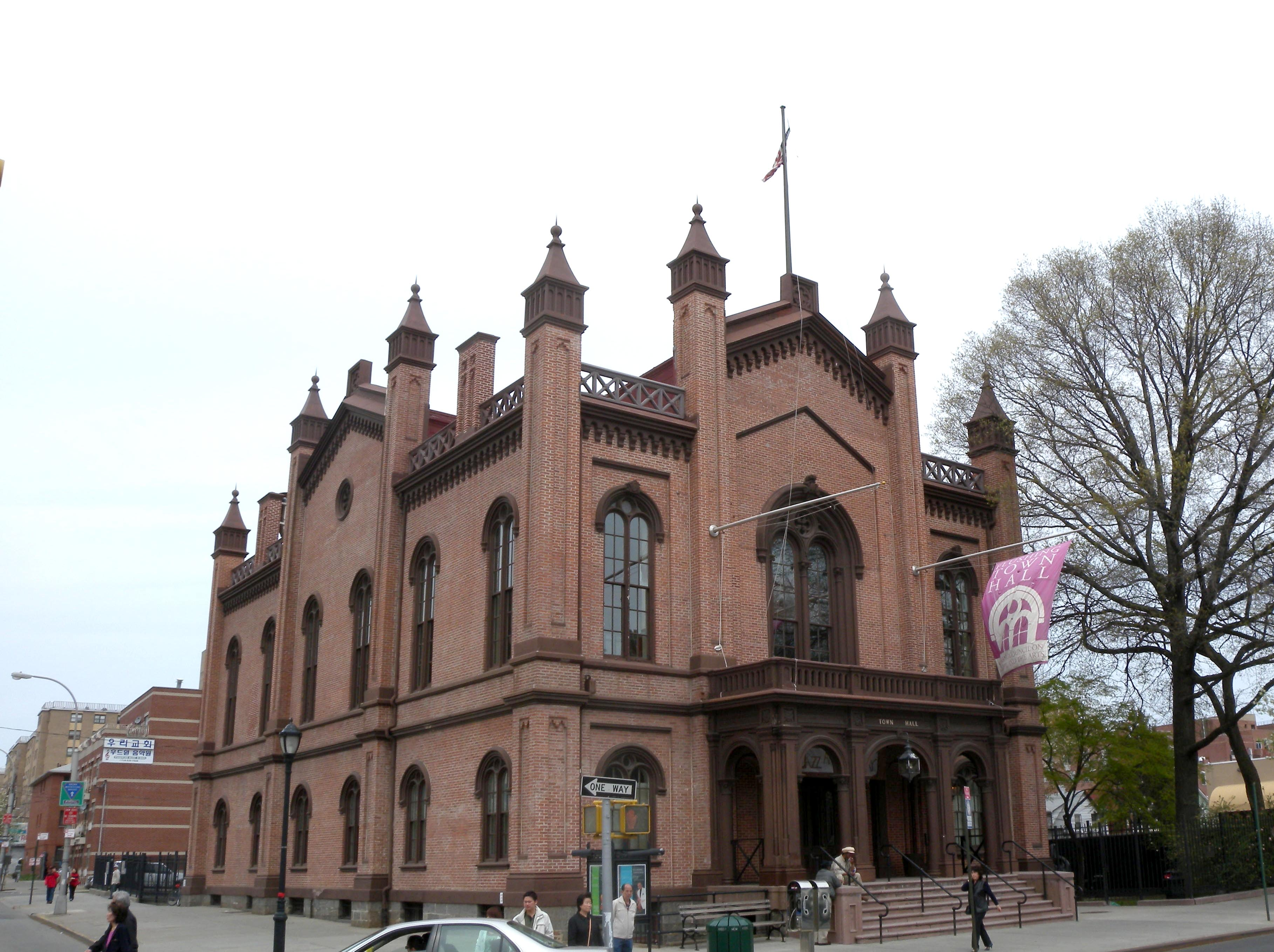
- Flushing Town Hall, April 2009

- Location within New York City Location within New York Location within the United States
- Location: 137-35 Northern Blvd., Flushing, Queens, New York, New York
- Coordinates: 40°45′50″N 73°49′49″W
- Area: less than one acre
- Built: 1862
- Website: www.flushingtownhall.org
- NRHP reference No.: 72000904
- NYSRHP No.: 08101.006131
- NYCL No.: 0139

Significant dates
- Added to NRHP: March 16, 1972
- Designated NYSRHP: June 23, 1980
- Designated NYCL: July 30, 1968

Flushing Town Hall is a performing arts center and historic town hall at 137-35 Northern Boulevard in the Flushing neighborhood of Queens in New York City. It served as the seat of government of the village of Flushing until the village became part of City of Greater New York in 1898. It was built in 1862 and is a 2-story, three-by-six-bay, brick building with basement and attic. A style of architecture that originated in Germany, Rundbogenstil ("round arch style"), was used here and in a number of American buildings of the Civil War Era. The earliest photographs show the building to have been painted a light color. The use of paint was discontinued following adhesion problems during a restoration. A small rear wing was added in 1938 containing a block of jail cells. The front facade features a triple arched portico topped by a classic entablature with low balustrade.

It was listed as a New York City Landmark in 1968 and on the National Register of Historic Places in 1972.

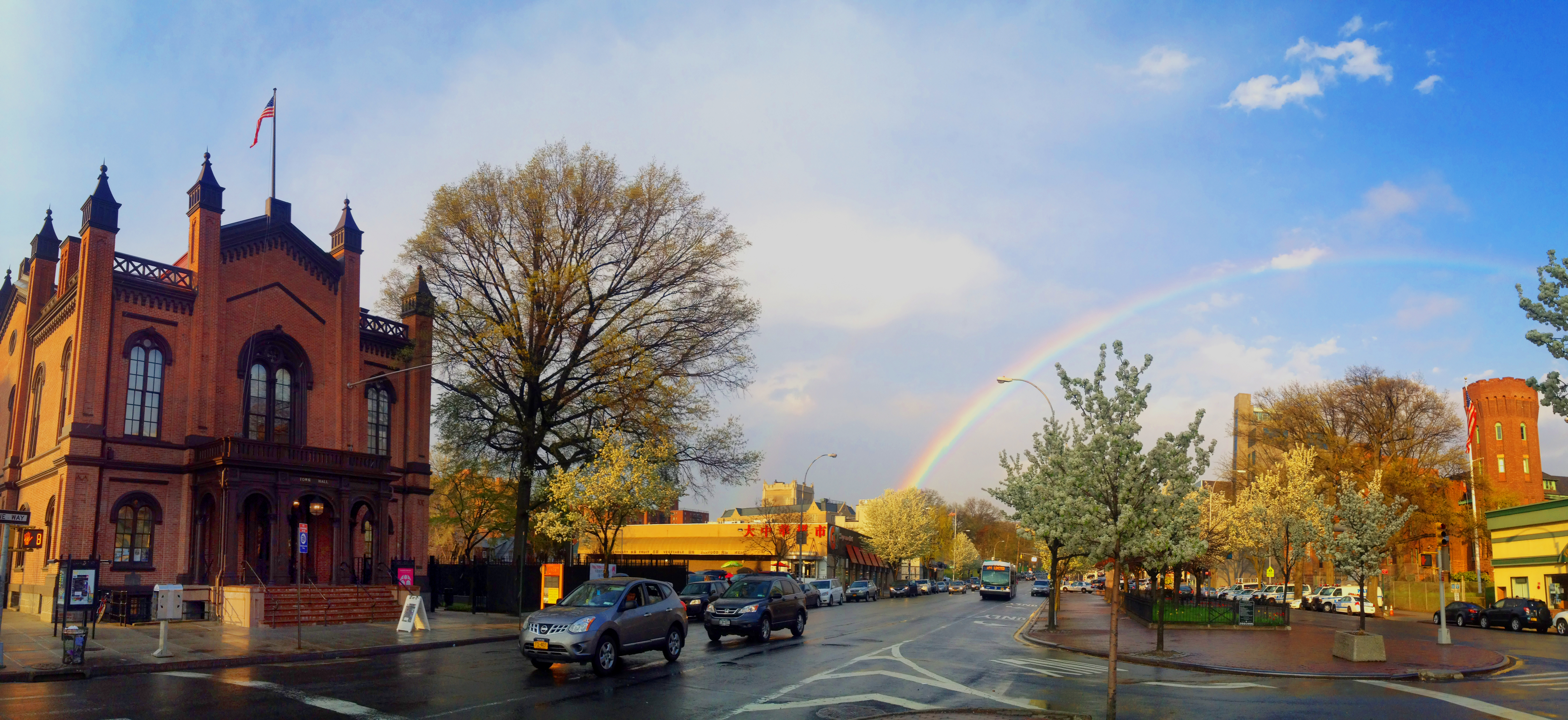
Flushing Town Hall today.

The building houses the Flushing Council on Culture and the Arts (FCCA). As a member of New York City's Cultural Institutions Group (CIG), the FCCA serves as stewards of Flushing Town Hall, restoring, managing and programming the historic 1862 landmark on behalf of the City of New York. FCCA celebrates the history of Queens as the home of jazz by presenting jazz performance.

== See also ==
- List of New York City Designated Landmarks in Queens
- National Register of Historic Places listings in Queens County, New York
