= Higa =

Higa or Fija (written: 比嘉) is a Ryukyuan surname. Notable people with the surname include:

- Charles Higa (1933–2012), American ceramic artist
- Daigo Higa (born 1995), Japanese boxer
- Diego Higa (born 1997), Brazilian race car driver
- Ernest Higa (born 1952), Japanese-American entrepreneur (Domino's, Wendy's)
- Karin Higa (1966–2013), American art curator
- Kohei Higa (比嘉 厚平; born 1990), Japanese footballer
- Kumiko Higa (born 1978), Japanese voice actress
- Mamiko Higa (born 1993), Japanese professional golfer
- Manami Higa (born 1986), Japanese actress
- Maurren Higa Maggi (born 1976), Brazilian athlete and Olympic gold medalist
- Maya Higa (born 1998), American conservationist and Twitch streamer
- Merle Higa (born 1941), Japanese-American businesswoman
- Minoru Higa (born 1941), Japanese grandmaster of Shōrin-ryū Kyudōkan
- Motoki Higa (born 1982), Japanese professional baseball pitcher
- Peechin Higa (1790–1870), Ryukyuan martial artist
- Primo Higa (born 1973), Solomon Island middle distance athlete
- Rikarudo Higa (born 1973), Brazilian-Japanese footballer (also known as "Ricardo Higa")
- Rino Higa (born 1992), Japanese gravure idol, actress, and singer
- Ryan Higa (born 1990), American internet personality known as "nigahiga"
- Ryoto Higa (born 1990), Japanese football player
- Seikan Higa (1887–1985), Okinawan Methodist minister in Hawaii
- Sekō Higa (1898–1966), Japanese Gojū Ryū karate teacher
- Suzuki Higa (born 1995), Japanese singer (Wolf Howl Harmony from Exile Tribe, Deep Squad)
- Thomas Taro Higa (1916–1985), American inventor and World War II veteran
- Teruo Higa (born 1941), Japanese horticulturist and professor at the University of the Ryukyus
- Yasuo Higa (1938–2000), Okinawan photographer, ethnologist, and anthropologist
- Yetsuo Higa (1915–2000), American businessman
- Yuchoku Higa (1910–1994), Japanese karate practitioner
- Yukari Higa, Japanese manga artist
- Yusuke Higa (born 1989), Japanese footballer

== Fictional characters ==
- Kanata Higa from the high school manga Harukana Receive (2015–2020)

== See also ==
- "Higa Noboru," a 2009 song by Plastic Ono Band for their album Between My Head and the Sky
- Higa River, a tributary of the Bârnaru River in Romania
- Lake Higa, a small lake in eastern Burkina Faso
