= Leilehua High School =

Coordinates: 21°30′3″N 158°0′44″W

Location
- 1515 California Avenue; Wahiawa, Hawaii 96786; United States

Information
- Type: Public, Co-educational
- Established: 1924
- School district: Central District
- Principal: Jason Nakamoto
- Teaching staff: 111.50 (FTE)
- Grades: 9-12
- Enrollment: 1,581 (2023-2024)
- Student to teacher ratio: 14.18
- Campus: Rural
- Colors: Green and Gold
- Athletics: Oahu Interscholastic Association
- Mascot: Mule
- Rival: Mililani High School; Radford High School
- Newspaper: Leilehua Sentinel
- Military: United States Army JROTC
- Website: http://www.leilehua.k12.hi.us

Leilehua High School is a public, co-educational, college preparatory high school in Wahiawa, Hawaii on the island of Oʻahu. It is part of the Hawaii State Department of Education, nationally recognized as a Blue Ribbon School by the United States Department of Education, and fully accredited by the Western Association of Schools and Colleges (WASC). The school was first established in 1924, when Hawaii was still a territory and located close to present day Schofield Barracks. The graduating class of 1928 totaled 15 students, all dependents of military personnel. It relocated to its present 32-acre (130,000 m^{2}) campus in the historic town of Wahiawa in 1949. The campus has sculptures by Satoru Abe, Bumpei Akaji, Claude Horan, Rick Mills, Jacob Sakaguchi, and Ken Shutt.

As of 2016, Schofield Barracks, Wheeler Army Airfield, and the Helemano Military Reservation are zoned to this school. Approximately 25% of the student body are from military families stationed at Schofield Barracks, Wheeler Army Airfield, and NCTAMS PAC (U.S. Navy) in Whitmore Village.

== History ==
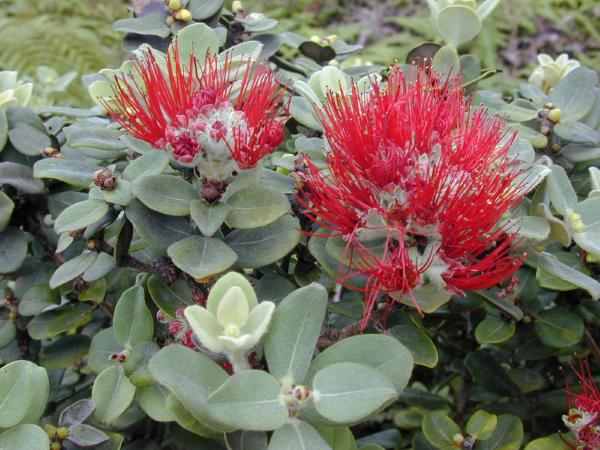
Leilehua High School is named after Metrosideros polymorpha or Lehua flower.

1949: The Schofield High and Grammar School and Leilehua High School were combined and built on its present 32 acre (129,000 m²) site.

1973: Leilehua won its first state basketball championship under coach Richard Townsend. The roster included Rick Wagner, who later played at football at the University of Hawaiʻi.

1984: Leilehua won its first Oahu Prep Bowl under coach Hugh Yoshida. Leilehua defeated Saint Louis 10-0.

1996: Leilehua earned a maximum six-year term of accreditation from the Western Association of Schools and Colleges (WASC).

2004: Leilehua High School named its stadium after its former football coach Hugh Yoshida.

2007: Leilehua won its first HHSAA Football Championship under coach Nolan Tokuda. Leilehua defeated Saint Louis 20-16.

2007, 2008: Cross Country coach Shawn Nakata led the Mules to back-to-back state titles with the help of Bryce Jenkins (the school's top runner/individual state champion).

2011: Cross Country coach Shawn Nakata made history having the first undefeated team in state history. The team was led by Elliot Estrada (state runner up) Dylan Martinez, Brandon Miya, Christopher Olverson, Joshua Castro and Freshmen brother Jordan Castro who later became the OIA 3000m champion and holder of several state records on the JV level.

== Student body ==
Ethnicity	Leilehua HS	State Average
Asian/Pacific Islander	60%	73%
Caucasian	24%	19%
African American	8%	2%
Hispanic	7%	5%
American Indian/Alaskan Native	<1%	<1%
Statistics for the 2008-2009 school year.

== Athletics ==
=== Sports ===
Sports
Seasons	Co-Ed	Boys	Girls
Fall	bowling, cheerleading (J/V), cross country running, air riflery, soft tennis, marching band	football (J/V)	softball (J), volleyball
Winter	basketball (J/V), paddling, soccer (J/V), swimming, wrestling (J/V)	baseball (J)	tennis (J)
Spring	golf, judo, tennis (V), track and field	baseball (V), volleyball (V)	softball (V), water polo

=== Athletic venues ===
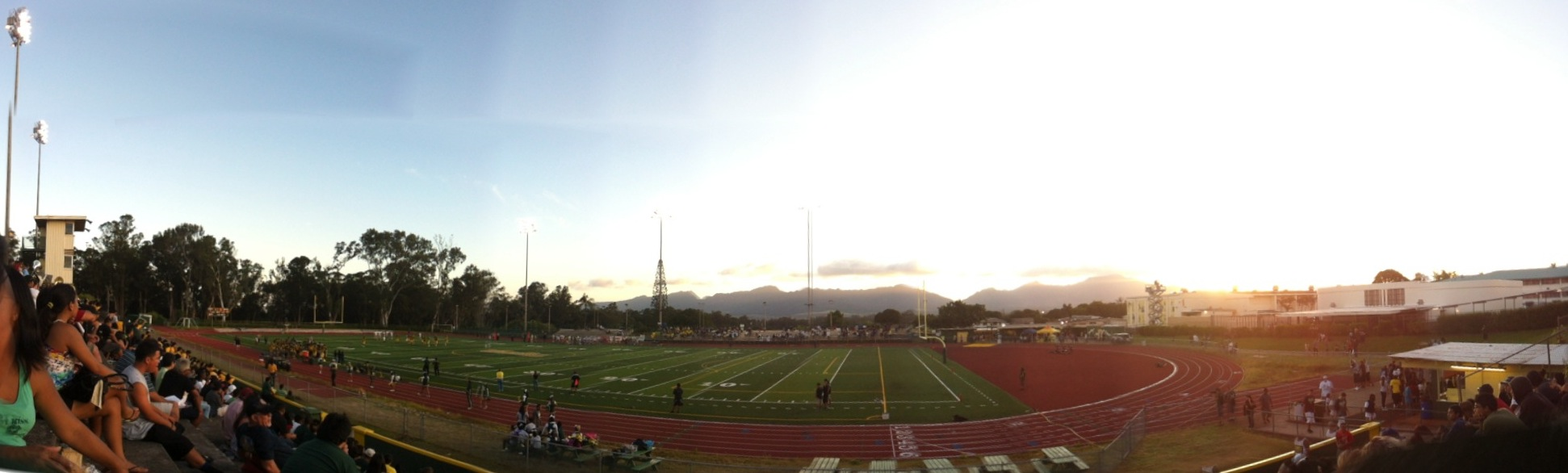
Hugh Yoshida Stadium

Athletic Facilities	Sports
Hugh Yoshida Stadium ("The Hugh")	football, soccer, track and field, marching band
Ka'ala Elementary School Softball Field*	softball
Fred Wright Park (Wahiawa District Park)*	baseball, swimming, water polo
Paul T. Kobayashi Gymnasium & Richard Townsend Court	basketball, volleyball, judo, wrestling, cheerleading
Army JROTC Firing Range	air riflery
Leilehua Tennis Complex	tennis, soft tennis
Leilehua Golf Course*	golf	* Located off campus

=== Championships ===
OIA Titles
Sport	Championship year(s)
Air riflery (boys)	1995, 1996, 1997, 1999, 2000, 2001, 2003
Air riflery (girls)	1995, 1996, 1997, 2000
Basketball (girls)	2013
Baseball	1960, 1962
Cross country (boys)	2005, 2006, 2007, 2008, 2009, 2010, 2011, 2012
Cross country (girls)	2006, 2007, 2008, 2009, 2010, 2011
Football	1940, 1974, 1984, 2007
Golf (combined)	1970, 1972, 1973, 1974, 1975
Golf (boys)	2001
Riflery, .22 (boys)*	1973, 1974, 1975, 1976, 1977, 1978, 1979, 1980, 1981, 1982, 1983, 1984, 1985, 1986, 1987, 1991, 1992, 1995, 1996, 1997, 1998, 1999, 2000, 2001
Riflery, .22 (girls)*	1980, 1981, 1982, 1983, 1984, 1985, 1986, 1987, 1996, 1997, 2000, 2001
Soccer (boys)	1978
Soccer (girls jv)	2012
Soccer (girls varsity)	2011
Soft tennis (boys)	1980, 1981, 1994
Soft tennis (girls)	1980, 1981, 1982, 1984, 1996, 2003, 2004
Swimming and diving (boys)	1984, 1985, 1993, 1999, 2000, 2005
Swimming and diving (girls)	1995
Tennis (boys)	1983
Tennis (girls)	1983, 1985
Track & field (girls)	1977, 1978, 1979
Volleyball (boys)	1973, 1974, 1984
* Discontinued in 2001

State Titles
Sport	Championship year(s)
Baseball	1962
Basketball	1973
Cross country (boys)	2007, 2008, 2011
Cross country (boys individual)	2006, 2007, 2008, 2009, 2010
Football	1984*, 2007
Golf (boys)	1974, 1975
Golf (boys individual)	1975
Golf (girls individual)	2004
Softball	2018
Tennis (girls)	1982
Tennis (girls individual)	1982
Tennis (girls double)	1999
Track & field (boys)	1976, 1983
Wrestling (boys)	1995
Wrestling (boys individual)	1996 (3), 1968, 1977, 1979, 1980, 1982, 1982, 1984 (2), 1995 (2), 1996, 1998, 2003, 2007
Wrestling (girls individual)	1998, 1999, 2000
* Oahu Prep Bowl Championship

=== Leilehua Mules football ===
The Leilehua Mules varsity football team is a Division I team representing the OIA Red conference, West Division. Nolan Tokuda has served as the team's head coach since 2004. The Mules have won two Division I titles in 1984 and 2007. The Leilehua football program has produced a number of NFL players such as Adrian Murrell, Al Harris, and Lauvale Sape (see notable alumni).

==== Rivalries ====
- Mililani Trojans, Cross-Town Rival (Main)
- Waianae Seariders
- Radford Rams, Unity Bowl (Army vs. Navy)

==== Coaches and history ====
			Titles
Season	Head coach	Record	Division (West)	Conference (OIA)	State
1984	Ralph McMurtry	--	--	OIA-Red Champ¹	--
74-84	Hugh Yoshida	--	West Champ (x2)	OIA-Red Champ (x2)	Prep Bowl Champ
96º-01	Cass Ishitani	--	--	OIA-White Champ	--
02º-03º	Jake Kawamata	7-10	--	--	--
2004	Nolan Tokuda*	11-3	2nd West	3rd Place OIA-Red	State DI Runner-Up
2005	Nolan Tokuda	4-5	3rd West	Lost OIA-Red Playoffs	--
2006	Nolan Tokuda	7-4	2nd West, Co-Champ	Lost OIA-Red Playoffs	--
2007	Nolan Tokuda	10-4	5th West	OIA-Red Champ	State DI Champ
2008	Nolan Tokuda	11-3	West Champ	3rd Place OIA-Red	State DI Runner-Up
2009	Nolan Tokuda	9-4	1st West, Co-Champ	OIA Red Runner-Up	Lost semi-final
2010	Nolan Tokuda	8-4	2nd West, Co-Champ	3rd Place OIA-Red	Lost semi-final
2011	Mark Kurisu (interim)	10-2-1	West Champ	3rd Place OIA-Red	Lost semi-final
2012	Nolan Tokuda	7-4	2nd West	Lost OIA-Red Playoffs	--
2013	Nolan Tokuda	6-4	5th West	Lost OIA-Red Playoffs
OIA Red titles: 1940, 1974, 1984, 2007
*= coach of the year º= white division (D II) ¹= first ever OIA-Red Title in league history -- information not available

== Marching Band ==
The Leilehua High School Marching Band and Color Guard was formed in 2006 under the direction of Alan Kinoshita and had been under his direction until 2017. From 2018 the marching band has been under the direction of Aladdin Roque-Dangaran. At its largest, the band grew to include approximately 120 members composing of wind instruments, percussion, and color guard. Since its debut in 2006, the band has been able to grow and evolve from the "Class Single A(A)" division in 2006, through "Class Double A(AA)”, and "Class Triple A(AAA)" in 2013. Additionally, the band has had the wonderful opportunity to perform for the Tenri Kyoko Gakuen High School band in Japan multiple times. The band's motto is F.I.R.E is an acronym which stands for: Focus, Intensity, Respect, and Excitement. Students are taught to instill these principles not only within the band room, but also as they go out into the world post-graduation. The Leilehua High School Marching Band has been able to compete and place with top schools including: Mililani, Moanalua, and Maui High Schools. Leilehua has also been able to place consistently high in nearly every major category within their respective division.

Achievements
Show(Year)	Division	Festival Rating	Band Director
Mo-Town(2008)	A	N/A	Alan Kinoshita
Aztec Fire(2007)	A	N/A	Alan Kinoshita
Carmina Burana(2008)	A	N/A	Alan Kinoshita
Summon the Heros(2009)	AA	Excellent(Mililani Trojan Bandfest)	Alan Kinoshita
Planets(2010)	AAA	Excellent(Mililani Trojan Bandfest)	Alan Kinoshita
Stargazers(2011)	AA	Excellent(Mililani Trojan Bandfest)	Alan Kinoshita
Carpe Noctem(2012)	AA	Excellent(Mililani Trojan Bandfest)	Alan Kinoshita
Invisible Man(2013)	AAA	Excellent(Mililani Trojan Bandfest)	Alan Kinoshita
Code Red(2014)	AAA	Superior(Mililani Trojan Bandfest)	Alan Kinoshita
Gravity(2015)	AAA	Superior(Kapolei Marching Band Festival)	Alan Kinoshita
Through Life Ethereal(2016)	AAA	Superior(Mililani Trojan Bandfest)	Alan Kinoshita
Midas Touch: The Golden Curse(2017)	AA	Good(Kamehameha Tournament of Bands)	

- Information used in this table is from the last competition from that year
- The festival rating judges the show as a whole from Good, Excellent, to Superior.
- Divisions are based on the number of students in a given band Single A(A) with up to approximately 60 members, Double A(AA) with up to approximately 80 members, and Triple A(AAA) anything larger than 100 members.
  - There may be a few exceptions with how a band is placed into a category at the discretion of the marching band council.

== Notable alumni ==
Listed alphabetically by surname:

- Jean Ariyoshi - former First Lady of Hawaii
- Ray Austin – American football player (born 1974)
- Lee Buenconsejo-Lum - medical school professor
- Robert Bunda – American politician (born 1947)
- Paul Dombroski – American football player (born 1956)
- Al Harris – American football player and coach (born 1956)
- Yetsuo Higa - businessman
- Edward N. Kaneshiro - Medal of Honor recipient
- Scott Loucks – American baseball player (born 1956)
- Bryant Moniz - American football player
- Adrian Murrell – American football player (born 1970)
- Netane Muti - American football player
- Itsuko Sue Nishikawa - director of the Woman's Missionary Union in Hawaii
- Marcus Oshiro – American politician (born 1959)
- Brendan Sagara - professional baseball coach
- Lauvale Sape – American football player (born 1980)
- Russell Suzuki - former Attorney General of Hawaii
- Antonio Taguba - United States major general
- Joyce Sachiko Tsunoda - university administrator
- Charles Tuaau - American football player
- Corinne Watanabe – American judge (born 1950)

== Filmography ==
- LOST - Leilehua High School appeared in the TV hit series LOST as "Cowan Heights."
