= Brendan Sagara =

American baseball coach (born 1975)

- Coach
- Born: January 25, 1975 (age 50); Wahiawa, Hawaii, U.S.
- Bats: Right Throws: Right

Teams
- As coach: Texas Rangers (2021–2022)

Brendan Masayoshi Sagara (born January 25, 1975) is an American professional baseball coach. He was a pitching coach for the Texas Rangers of Major League Baseball (MLB).

== Career ==
Sagara attended Leilehua High School in Wahiawa, Hawaii, and the University of Hawaiʻi at Hilo, where he played college baseball for the Hawaii–Hilo Vulcans from 1992 to 1996. He pitched in four games for the Evansville Otters of the Frontier League in 1999. From 2000 through 2012, Sagara served as a pitching coach and as an assistant director of player procurement for various independent professional leagues. Sagara served as an assistant coach for Hawaii–Hilo during the 2003–2004 season.

From 2006 through 2010, Sagara served as an assistant scout for the New York Mets. He served as a scout for the Atlanta Braves from 2010 through 2012. Sagara then joined the Miami Marlins organization and from 2011 through 2015, served as a pitching coach in their minor league system. Sagara was the Marlins assistant pitching coordinator from 2016 through 2017. Sagara was hired by the Chicago Cubs and served as their minor league pitching coordinator for the 2018 and 2019 seasons. Sagara was then hired by the Texas Rangers to serve as the pitching coach for the Nashville Sounds in 2020. He instead served as special assistant for player development at the Rangers 2020 alternate training site.

On October 26, 2020, Sagara was promoted to co-pitching coach for the Rangers, alongside Doug Mathis. The Rangers dismissed Mathis after the 2022 season and offered Sagara a different position within the organization.
