= Charles Tuaau =

American football player (born 1992)

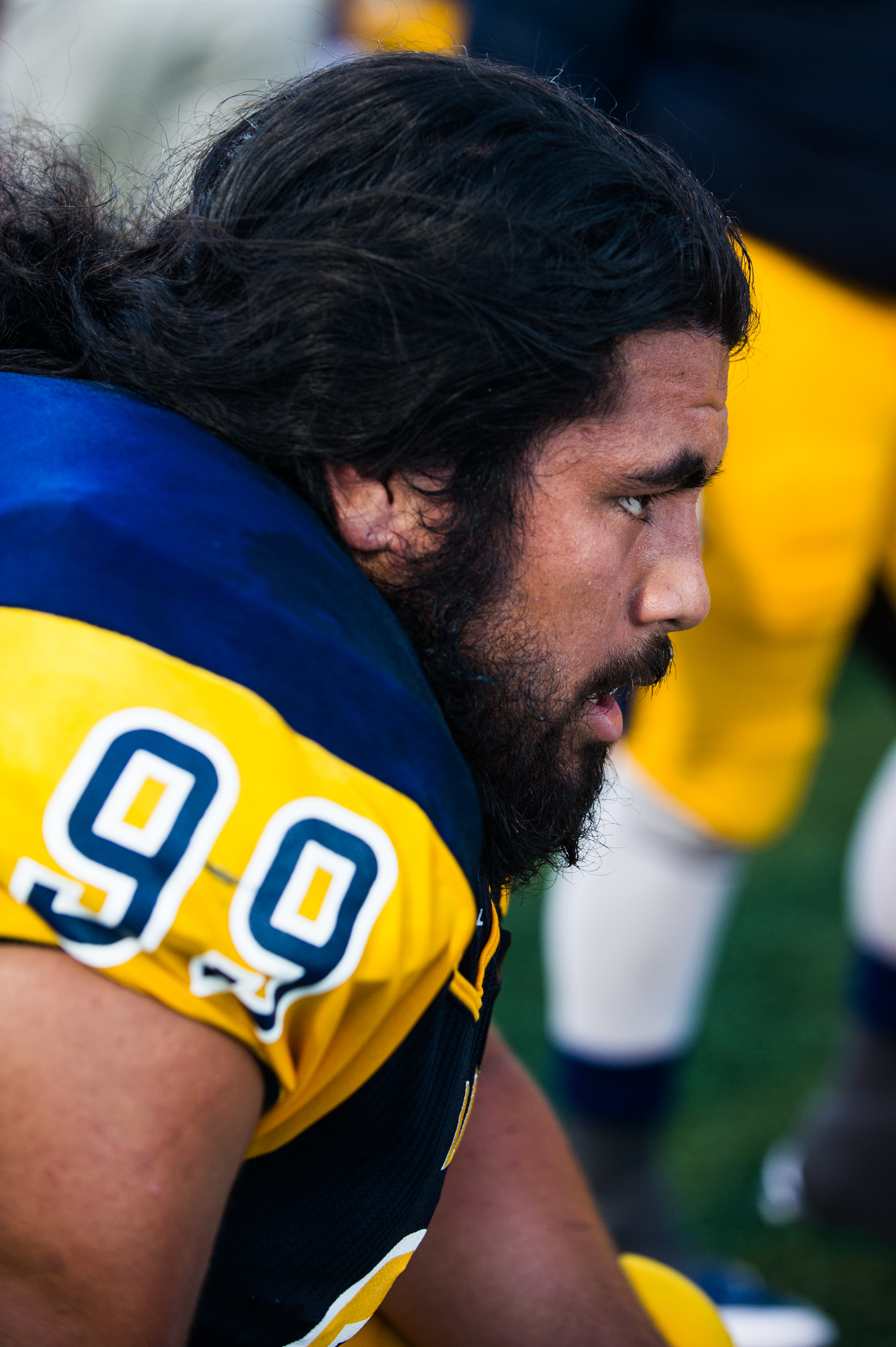
- Tuaau playing for A&M–Commerce in 2014

No. 75, 60, 61, 92, 99
- Position: Defensive tackle

Personal information
- Born: January 4, 1992 (age 34); Wahiawa, Hawaii, U.S.
- Listed height: 6 ft 5 in (1.96 m)
- Listed weight: 310 lb (141 kg)

Career information
- High school: Leilehua (HI)
- College: Texas A&M–Commerce
- NFL draft: 2015: undrafted

Career history
- Kansas City Chiefs (2015)*; Hudson Valley Fort (2015); Miami Dolphins (2016)*; IBM Big Blue (2017–2019); St. Louis BattleHawks (2020)*
- * Offseason or practice squad member only

Awards and highlights
- NCAA Division II All-American (2013); LSC Defensive Player of the Year (2013); LSC Defensive Lineman of the Year (2013)

Charles Tuaau (/ˈtuːaʊ/ TOO-ow, born January 4, 1992) is an American former football defensive tackle. He played for the Kansas City Chiefs and Miami Dolphins of the National Football League (NFL) after he went undrafted in the 2015 NFL Draft. He also played for the IBM Big Blue of Japan's X-League.

The native of Hawaii played college football at two junior colleges in California, Pasadena City College and Riverside City College, before transferring to Texas A&M University–Commerce, where he earned All-American honors.

== Playing career ==
=== High school ===
Tuaau attended and played football at Leilehua High School in his native Wahiawa, Hawaii. He signed a letter of intent with the University of Hawaii after completing high school, but instead enrolled at Pasadena City College (PCC), a California junior college, in 2011.

=== College ===
In 2011, Tuaau played football for PCC, and during his freshman season he recorded 45 tackles, including 17 tackles for loss and 5 sacks, and led the team with 7 quarterback hurries. He was named to the SCFA All-National Southern Conference First-team.

After his 2011 season at PCC, he transferred to Riverside City College for his sophomore season in 2012. He accumulated 48 tackles and 9 sacks during the 2012 season.

In February 2013, Tuaau signed with Oregon State University, although he failed to meet its academic requirements and ultimately transferred to Texas A&M University–Commerce instead. He immediately made a significant impact during his first season at A&M–Commerce in 2013: he tallied 59 tackles, 25 tackles for loss, and 12.5 sacks in his first season, setting school season records for sacks (12.5) and tackles for loss (25), as well as the record for tackles for loss in a single game (5). He also earned Lone Star Conference Defensive Player of the Year and Defensive Lineman of the Year honors and was named to the AFCA All-America first-team and Daktronics All-America second-team in 2013.

Prior to the 2014 season, Tuaau was named a preseason Division II All-American by Beyond Sports Network. He also gained attention from NFL scouts, as College Football 24/7 writer Mike Huguenin praised his "disruptive nature" and opined that his 2013 statistics were "staggering numbers for a nose tackle".

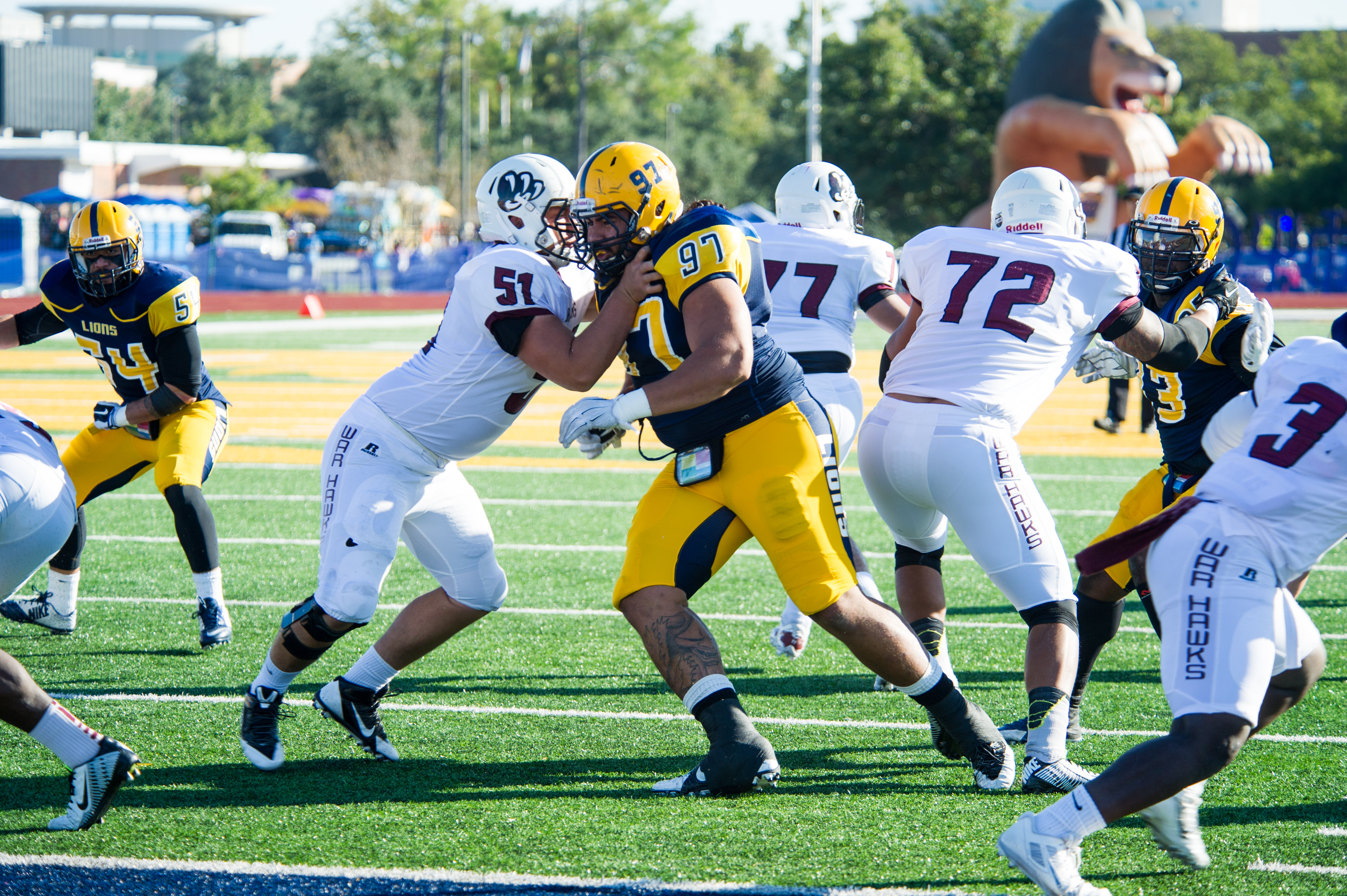
Tuaau (97) in action against McMurry in 2014

In his senior season in 2014, Tuaau amassed 27 tackles, including 14 unassisted tackles, 9 tackles for loss, and 4.5 sacks. He was selected as a Cliff Harris Award finalist as one of the nation's most outstanding defensive players at a "small college", and also helped lead A&M–Commerce to the 2014 Lone Star Conference championship.

Tuaau finished his two-year career at A&M–Commerce with 86 tackles, including 45 solo tackles, 34 tackles for loss, and 17 sacks. D2Football.com placed him 23rd on its list of the Top 100 NCAA Division II prospects available in the 2015 NFL Draft.

==== Career statistics at A&M–Commerce ====
Year	Team	GP	TT	Solo	Ast	TFL	Sack	PDef	INT	FF	FR	BK	TD
2013	Texas A&M–Commerce	12	59	31	28	25	12.5	1	0	1	2	0	0
2014	Texas A&M–Commerce	11	27	14	13	9	4.5	0	0	0	0	2	0
Career	Totals	23	86	45	41	34	17	1	0	1	2	2	0

=== Kansas City Chiefs ===
After going undrafted in the 2015 NFL Draft, Tuaau signed with the Kansas City Chiefs on May 15, 2015. Because his May 2015 graduation ceremony fell on the same weekend that he was due to report to minicamp with the Chiefs, A&M–Commerce organized a special commencement ceremony for him. His wife, mother, and grandmother were all present as he became the first person in his family to earn a college degree. On August 24, 2015, the Chiefs experimented with moving him to the offensive line in practice, in what offensive coordinator Doug Pederson viewed as a learning experience for Tuaau. Pederson noted that Tuaau is "big, physical...powerful" and that he "fits that offensive line mode". However, he was cut by Kansas City on August 30, along with ten other players in the team's first round of cuts.

=== Miami Dolphins ===
Tuaau signed a reserve/future contract with the Miami Dolphins on January 14, 2016. On June 16, 2016, Tuaau was cut by Miami.

=== IBM Big Blue ===
In August 2017, Tuaau signed a contract to play for IBM Big Blue of the X-League in Japan.

=== St. Louis BattleHawks ===
Tuaau signed with the St. Louis BattleHawks of the XFL during mini-camp in December 2019. He was waived during final roster cuts on January 22, 2020.
