= Paul Dombroski =

American football player (born 1956)

No. 46, 47
- Position: Defensive back

Personal information
- Born: August 8, 1956 (age 70); Sumter, South Carolina, U.S.
- Listed height: 6 ft 0 in (1.83 m)
- Listed weight: 185 lb (84 kg)

Career information
- High school: Leilehua (Wahiawa, Hawaii)
- College: Hawaii; Linfield
- NFL draft: 1980: undrafted

Career history
- Kansas City Chiefs (1980–1981); New England Patriots (1981–1984); Tampa Bay Buccaneers (1985)

Career NFL statistics
- Interceptions: 2
- Fumble recoveries: 1
- Return yards: 85
- Stats at Pro Football Reference

Paul Matthew Dombroski (born August 8, 1956) is an American former professional football player who was a defensive back for six seasons in the National Football League (NFL). He played college football for the Linfield Wildcats. He was one of the few people of Okinawan descent to play in the NFL.

After retiring from the NFL, Dombroski went through a number of odd jobs before settling on opening and working at a hair salon. Dombroski is also a survivor of breast cancer, having been diagnosed in 2013 after noticing the signs early due to both his parents being diagnosed with cancer.
