= Itsuko =

- Gender: Female

Origin
- Origin: Japanese
- Meaning: Different meanings depending on the kanji used

Itsuko (variously written: 逸子 or 伊都子, 伊津子, 慈子, 五子, 五十子, 以津子, 衣津子, 溢子, 聿子) is a feminine Japanese given name. Notable people with the name include:

- Itsuko Hasegawa (長谷川 逸子) (born 1941), Japanese architect
- Itsuko Sue Nishikawa (died 2004), American baptist
- Princess Nashimoto Itsuko (ja:梨本伊都子) (1882–1976), daughter or Nabeshima Naohiro and mother of Bangja, Crown Princess Euimin of Korea
