= Suzanne Vares-Lum =

Retired United States Army two-star general, President of East–West Center

Suzanne Puanani Vares-Lum
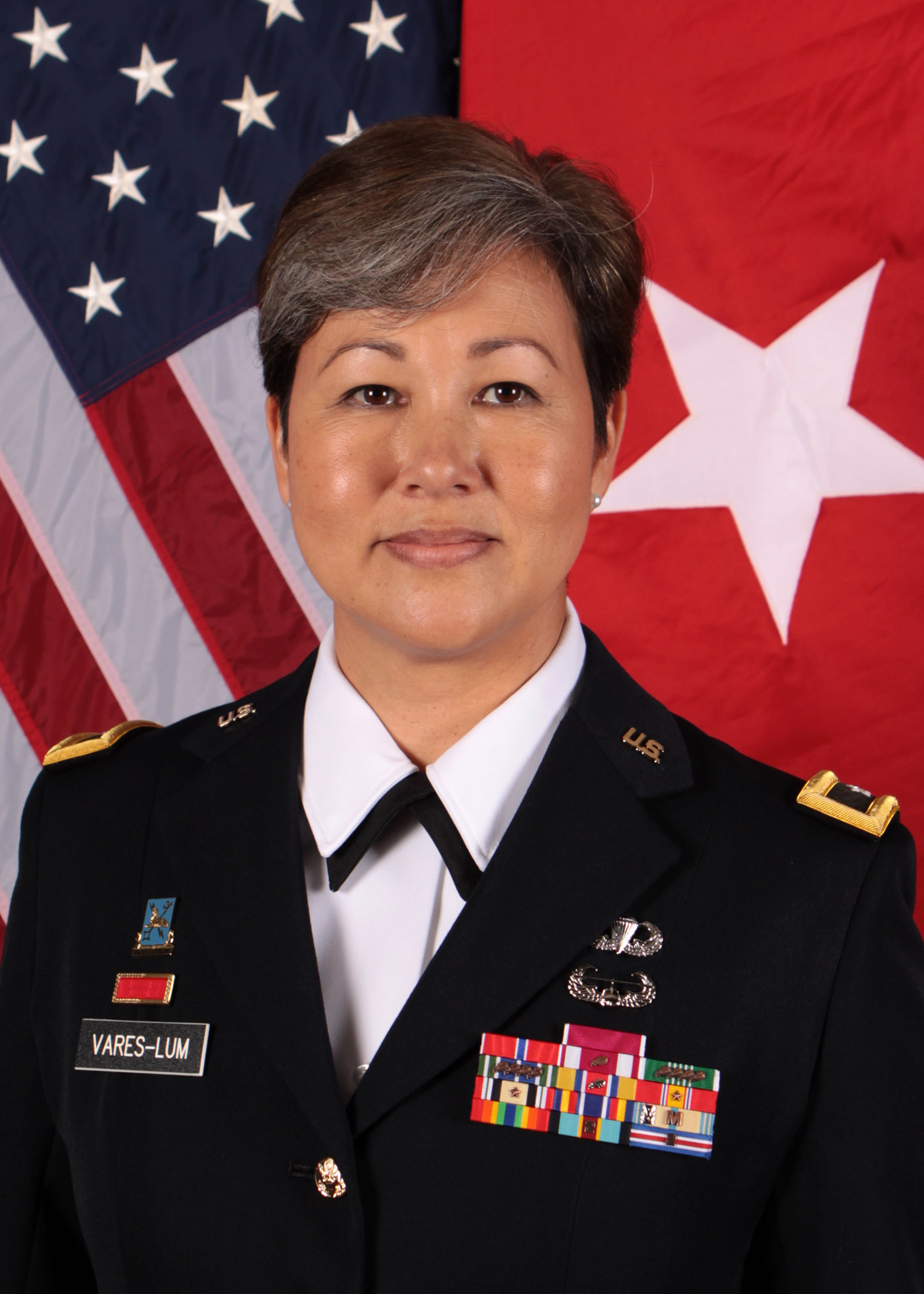
- Born: 1967 (age 58–59); Wahiawa, Hawaii
- Education: University of Hawaiʻi at Mānoa
- Known for: President of East–West Center
- Spouse: Courtney Lum
- Children: 2
- Awards: Defense Superior Service; Legion of Merit; Bronze Star; Knowlton Awardee
- Military career
- Branch: United States Army
- Rank: Major General
- Commands: 298th MFTU; Hawaii Army National Guard
- Conflicts: Iraq War

Suzanne Puanani Vares-Lum (born 1967) is the president of East–West Center in Honolulu, HI, and a former Major General in the United States Army.

In 2015, she became the first Native Hawaiian woman to become a general, and upon her appointment as president of East-West Center in 2021, became its first woman and the first Native Hawaiian to lead the organization since it was founded in 1960.

Vares-Lum was a career intelligence officer and an influential executive advising the most senior leadership of the United States Indo-Pacific Command (USINDOPACOM), where she played a key role in USINDOPACOM's effort to shape and maintain regional security through development of diplomatic, economic, and military policies. This included building and maintaining military-to-military and political-military relationships amongst the 43 nations within the Pacific region, engaging with senior leaders in the Department of Defense, local government, local communities, and Members of Congress.

In 2023, Bank of Hawaii elected Vares-Lum to also serve on its board of directors, serving on the Nominating and Corporate Governance Committee and Fiduciary and Investment Management Committee.

== Early life ==
Born and raised in Wahiawa, like many in Hawaii, Vares-Lum's ancestry reflects the multitude of cultural influences present in the state. Her mother is from Japan, while her father's family is Hawaiian, Portuguese, Tahitian, Chinese and English. Her father also instilled a strong sense of service, serving in Vietnam, and her sister also served.

She told Honolulu Civil Beat in 2021, "it’s not just (Hawaii's) geographic location that makes it a hub for the U.S. military and its allies. Because I’m from Hawaii, I would say it’s also our ability to bring cultures together, to understand cultural language in the background so that we can engage effectively in the region”.

== Military career ==
Commissioned on May 15, 1988, through the ROTC program at the University of Hawaii at Manoa, Vares-Lum served on active duty as a Regular Army officer from 1989 to 1993 as the 103rd Military Intelligence Battalion Headquarters and Headquarters Support Company Executive Officer, the C Co., 103rd MI Trailblazer Platoon Leader, and the Division Artillery Fire Support Intelligence Officer in the 3rd Infantry Division, Wurzburg, Germany. In 1993, Vares-Lum left active duty and joined the 29th Separate Infantry Brigade (SIB), Hawaii Army National Guard where she served as the 29th Support Battalion S-2, the 29th SIB Assistant S-2, the first 229th Military Intelligence Company Commander, and the 29th SIB G-2. She also served as the 2nd Battalion Commander, 298th MFTU, HIARNG. Following this position, she served as the Joint Forces Headquarters, Hawaii National Guard J2. She later served as the commander of the 298th Regiment, Multifunctional Training Unit (RTI), Hawaii Army National Guard, where she was responsible for the Officer Candidate Program, NCOES and 11 B WLC and MOS-Q courses. She served as the Vice Chief of the Joint Staff and HING J2 and as the Chief of the Joint Staff, Hawaii National Guard.

Vares-Lum was mobilized in support of Operation Iraqi Freedom III from August 2004 to March 2006. As the 29th Infantry Brigade Combat Team S-2, she established and led the Joint Intelligence Center in Balad, Iraq.

Her military schools include the Military Intelligence Officer Basic Course, Military Intelligence Officer Advanced Course, Combined Arms and Services Staff School, Command and General Staff Officer's Course, the U.S. Army War College (DDE), Airborne School, and Air Assault School.

== Awards and decorations ==
U.S. military decorations
	Defense Superior Service Medal
	Legion of Merit
	Bronze Star (with 1 Bronze Star Oak Leaf Cluster)
	Meritorious Service Medal (with 1 Bronze Oak Leaf Cluster)
	Army Commendation Medal (with 4 Bronze Oak Leaf Clusters)
	Army Achievement Medal (with 4 Bronze Oak Leaf Clusters)
	Army Reserve Components Achievement Medal (with 1 Silver Oak Leaf Cluster)
U.S. unit awards
	Army Meritorious Unit Commendation
U.S. service (campaign) medals and service and training ribbons
	National Defense Service Medal (with 1 Service Star)
	Iraq Campaign Medal (with 1 Service Star)
	Global War on Terrorism Service Medal
Silver Hourglass Device	Armed Forces Reserve Medal (with Silver Hourglass and "M" Device)
	Army Service Ribbon
	Army Overseas Service Ribbon (with award numeral 2)
	Army Reserve Components Overseas Training Ribbon

U.S. badges, patches and tabs
Air Assault Badge
Basic Parachutist Badge
Military Intelligence Corps
29th Infantry Brigade Combat Team

== Other Awards ==
- 2023 Girl Scouts of Hawaii Woman of Distinction
- 2017 Ellis Island Medal of Honor Recipient, nominated by USPACOM Commander Admiral Harris
- 2017 SEH Women's History Month Honoree Panel Member, Redefining Standards, Making a Difference, and Inspiring Others
- 2016 University of Hawaii ROTC Hall of Fame Inductee
- 2016 National ROTC Hall of Fame Inductee, Ft. Knox, Kentucky
- 2015 Knowlton Awardee for Military Intelligence Corps Professionals
- 2013 Hawaii National Guard Association Outstanding Army Officer of the Year
- 2011 U.S. Army War College Commandant's Writing Award for Research: Security in the Philippines and Indonesia: The U.S. Military Role in Southeast Asia
