= Lillian E. Fishburne =

U.S. Navy admiral (born 1949)

Lillian Elaine Fishburne
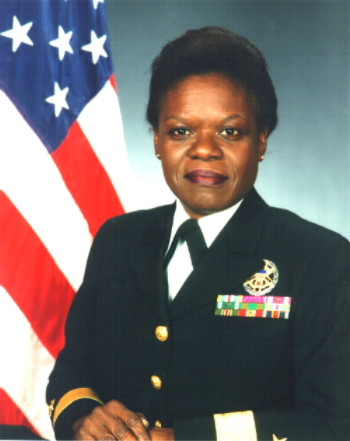
- Born: March 25, 1949 (age 77); Patuxent River, Maryland, U.S.
- Military career
- Allegiance: United States of America
- Branch: United States Navy
- Service years: 1973–2001
- Rank: Rear admiral (lower half)
- Commands: Naval Computer and Telecommunications Area Master Station Pacific
- Awards: Defense Superior Service Medal; Legion of Merit; Meritorious Service Medal (2); Navy Commendation Medal (2); Navy Achievement Medal

Lillian Elaine Fishburne (born March 25, 1949) was the first African-American female to hold the rank of Rear Admiral (RDML) in the United States Navy. She was appointed to the rank of Rear Admiral (Lower Half) by U.S. president Bill Clinton and was officially promoted on February 1, 1998. She retired from the Navy in February 2001.

== Early life and education ==
Fishburne was born March 25, 1949, at Patuxent River, Maryland, and raised in Rockville, Maryland. She was commissioned an ensign upon completion of Women Officers School at Newport, Rhode Island, in February 1973.

Fishburne graduated from Lincoln University, Oxford, Pennsylvania in 1971 with a Bachelor of Arts degree in sociology. She received a Master of Arts in management from Webster College, St. Louis, Missouri in 1980. Fishburne was awarded a Master of Science degree in Telecommunications Systems Management from the Naval Postgraduate School, Monterey, California in 1982. Also, she is a 1993 graduate of the Industrial College of the Armed Forces, Fort McNair, Washington, D.C.

== Career ==
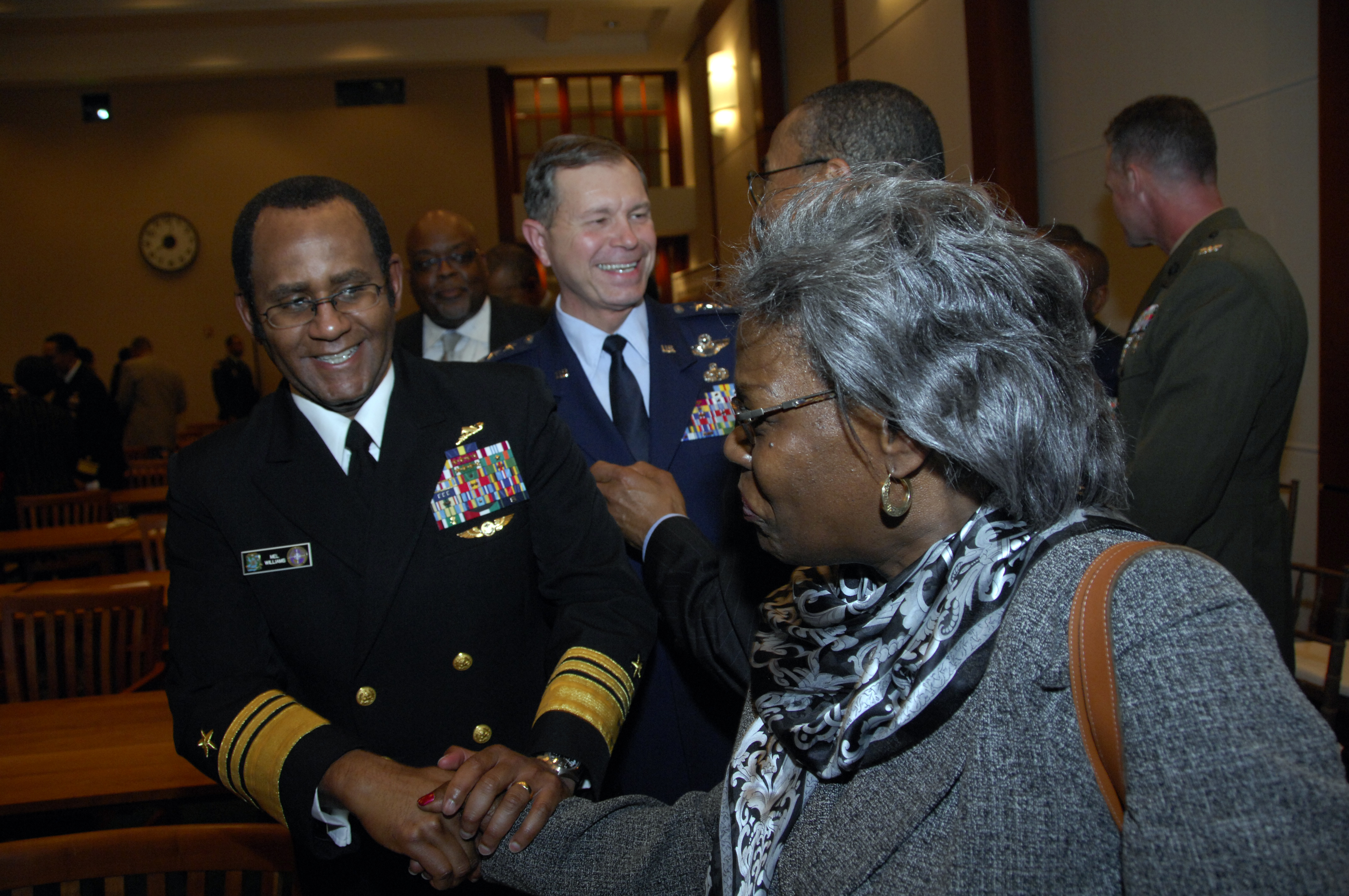
Fishburne shakes hands with Vice Adm. Mel Williams at a 2009 ceremony

Her first duty assignment was as the Personnel and Legal Officer at the Naval Air Test Facility, Lakehurst, New Jersey. In August 1974, she was assigned to Navy Recruiting District, Miami, Florida as an Officer Programs recruiter until November 1977.

From November 1977 to August 1980, Fishburne was the Officer in Charge of the Naval Telecommunications Center, Great Lakes, Illinois. She then spent two years as a student at the Naval Postgraduate School, Monterey, California. Upon completion of postgraduate school, she reported to the Command, Control, Communications Directorate, Chief of Naval Operations (OP-940). There, she served as the Assistant Head, Joint Allied Command and Control Matters Branch until December 1984.

Fishburne's next assignment was Executive Officer, Naval Communication Station, Yokosuka, Japan. In February 1987, she was assigned to the Command, Control, and Communications Directorate, Chief of Naval Operations (OP-942) as a Special Projects Officer. Her next duty assignment was Commanding Officer, Naval Computer and Telecommunications Station, Key West, Florida from July 1990 to July 1992. Following this tour, RDML Fishburne was a student at the Industrial College of the Armed Forces until 1993. Upon graduation, she was assigned to the Command, Control, Communications and Computer Systems Directorate, The Joint Staff, Washington, D.C., assuming the position as Chief, Command and Control Systems Support Division (J6C) in December 1994. Next, Fishburne assumed command of Naval Computer and Telecommunications Area Master Station, Eastern Pacific, Wahiawa, Hawaii (later renamed Naval Computer and Telecommunications Area Master Station Pacific) on August 25, 1995. In her final assignment she served as the Director, Information Transfer Division for the Space, Information Warfare, Command and Control Directorate, Chief of Naval Operations, Washington, D.C.

== Awards and decorations ==
- Defense Superior Service Medal
- Legion of Merit
- Meritorious Service Medal with Gold Star
- Navy and Marine Corps Commendation Medal with Gold Star
- Navy and Marine Corps Achievement Medal

== See also ==
- Women in the United States Navy
