= Yetsuo Higa =

Yetsuo "Yets" Higa Higa Etsuo (比嘉 悦雄) (1915–July 31, 2000) was a second-generation Okinawan American businessman.

Higa was born in Honokaa, Hawaii in 1915. He and his family moved to Wahiawa in 1923. After graduating from Leilehua High School in 1934, he joined and expanded his father's trucking business. Over his career Y. Higa Enterprises grew from a single truck to a multi-million dollar enterprise with branches in Hong Kong, Tokyo, and Paris. Higa also opened the first Pepsi-cola bottling plant in Japan, and is credited with introducing it to the nation. His son Ernest and his daughter Merle Aiko followed him in business, opening up their own franchises in Japan.

Higa was also an athlete who played baseball and ran track and field. He brought two Major League Baseball teams to Hawaii and Japan to play.

Higa died on July 31, 2000, of complications from Alzheimer's disease.
