= Al Harris (defensive lineman) =

American football player and coach (born 1956)

No. 90, 95
- Positions: Defensive end, linebacker

Personal information
- Born: December 31, 1956 (age 69); Bangor, Maine, U.S.
- Listed height: 6 ft 5 in (1.96 m)
- Listed weight: 250 lb (113 kg)

Career information
- High school: Leilehua (Wahiawa, Hawaii)
- College: Arizona State
- NFL draft: 1979: 1st round, 9th overall pick

Career history

Playing
- Chicago Bears (1979–1984, 1986–1988); Philadelphia Eagles (1989–1990)

Coaching
- San Francisco 49ers (2009–2010) Pass rush specialist

Awards and highlights
- Unanimous All-American (1978); First-team All-Pac-10 (1978)

Career NFL statistics
- Sacks: 23.5
- Fumble recoveries: 10
- Interceptions: 4
- Stats at Pro Football Reference

Alfred Carl Harris (born December 31, 1956) is an American former professional football player who was a defensive end and linebacker in the National Football League (NFL) for twelve seasons during the 1970s, 1980s and 1990s. He played college football for Arizona State University, and earned All-American honors. He was a first-round pick in the 1979 NFL draft, and played professionally for the Chicago Bears and Philadelphia Eagles of the NFL.

== Early life ==
Harris was born on December 31, 1956, in Bangor, Maine. He grew up on United States Air Force bases, living in Maine, Mississippi, North Carolina, California, West Virginia, New Jersey, and Hawaii. Harris attended Leilehua High School in Wahiawa, Hawaii.

== College career ==
Harris attended Arizona State University, where he played for the Arizona State Sun Devils football team from 1975 to 1978. As a senior in 1978, he was a consensus first-team All-American.

== Professional career ==
The Chicago Bears chose Harris in the first round (ninth pick overall) in the 1979 NFL Draft. Harris played for the Bears from 1979 to 1984, and again from 1986 to 1988. Harris sat out the entire 1985 season due to a contract dispute with the Bears, and missed being part of one of the most dominating Super Bowl teams of all time.

Harris returned in 1986, but a hamstring injury and the contract dispute still lingered over his tenure with the Bears, and he signed a free agent contract with the Philadelphia Eagles in the off-season in 1989. He played two years with the Eagles before retiring.

== Coaching career ==
From 2009 to 2010, Harris was the pass rush specialist coach for the San Francisco 49ers. He was dismissed by the San Francisco 49ers on December 27, 2010, after 49ers President Jed York fired head coach Mike Singletary.
