= John A. Burns School of Medicine =

Medical school of the University of Hawaiʻi at Mānoa

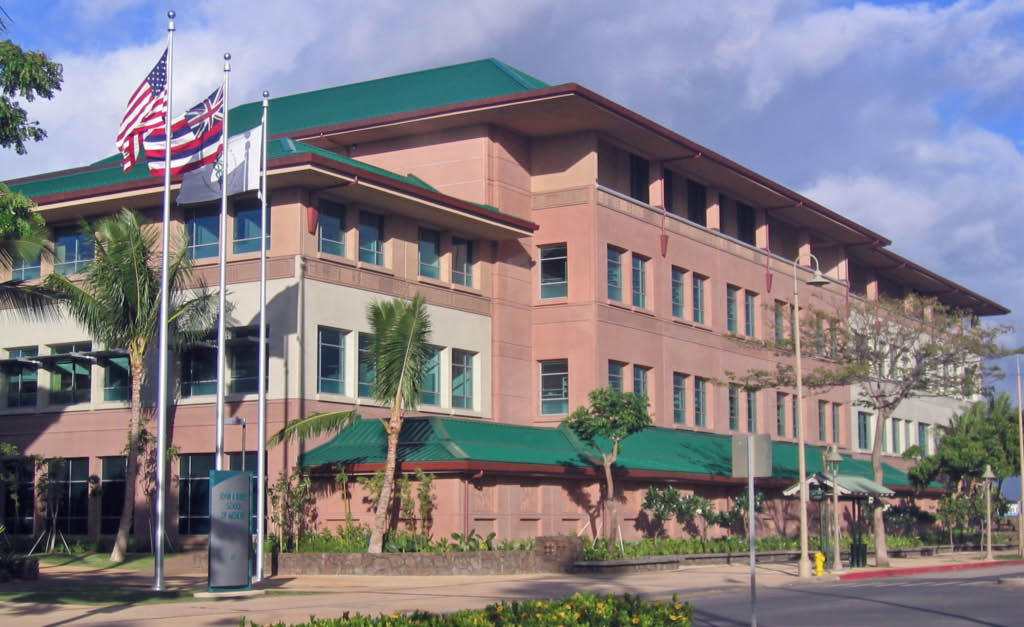
- Type: Public medical school
- Established: 1965; 61 years ago
- Parent institution: University of Hawaiʻi at Mānoa
- Dean: Lee Buenconsejo-Lum (interim)
- Faculty: 184
- Students: 289
- Postgraduates: 226
- Location: Honolulu, Hawaii, Hawaii, United States; 21°17′48.47797″N 157°51′48.17979″W
- Campus: Urban
- Website: jabsom.hawaii.edu

The John A. Burns School of Medicine is the medical school of the University of Hawaiʻi at Mānoa, on the island of O‘ahu, Hawaii. The medical school is approximately three miles west of the university's Mānoa campus. The school was named after former governor of Hawaii John A. Burns in 1965.

Jerris Hedges was the dean for 15 years until his retirement in 2023.

In 2023, U.S. News & World Report ranked the school 16th "Best Medical School" in the U.S.
