= Lauvale Sape =

American football player (born 1980)

No. 66, 93, 95, 97
- Position: Defensive tackle

Personal information
- Born: August 29, 1980 (age 46); American Samoa
- Listed height: 6 ft 1 in (1.85 m)
- Listed weight: 296 lb (134 kg)

Career information
- High school: Leilehua (Wahiawa, Hawaii, U.S.)
- College: Utah
- NFL draft: 2003: 6th round, 187th overall pick

Career history
- Buffalo Bills (2003–2005); Berlin Thunder (2007); Oakland Raiders (2007)*; Tennessee Titans (2007)*; New Orleans VooDoo (2008); Colorado Crush (2008); Las Vegas Locomotives (2009–2011); Utah Blaze (2010, 2012)
- * Offseason or practice squad member only

Awards and highlights
- 2× UFL champion (2009, 2010); 2× Second-team All-Mountain West (2001, 2002)

Career NFL statistics
- Total tackles: 8
- Fumble recoveries: 1
- Stats at Pro Football Reference
- Stats at ArenaFan.com

Lauvale Sape (/ləˈvɑːleɪ sɑːˈpeɪ/ lə-VAH-lay sah-PAY; born August 29, 1980) is an American former professional football player who was a defensive tackle in the National Football League (NFL). He was selected by the Buffalo Bills in the sixth round of the 2003 NFL draft. He played college football for the Utah Utes.

Sape was also a member of the Berlin Thunder, Oakland Raiders, Tennessee Titans, New Orleans VooDoo, Colorado Crush, Las Vegas Locomotives and Utah Blaze.

== Early life ==
Sape was born in American Samoa. He later played high school football at Leilehua High School in Wahiawa, Hawaii, earning first-team All-State honors.

== College career ==
Sape was a member of the Utah Utes football team from 1998 to 2002. He was ruled ineligible in 1998 due to being an academic partial qualifier. He was named Utah's defensive scout team player of the year that season. After having missed most of the 1999 season due to a knee injury, Sape played in the final two games of the year. He appeared in all 11 games, starting one, in 2000, recording 36 tackles. He played in all 12 games during the 2001 season, totaling 25 tackles and five sacks, garnering second-team All-Mountain West recognition. Sape graduated from Utah in four years by spring 2002, granting the one-time academic partial qualifier a fourth year of eligibility. He accumulated 23 tackles, one sack and three pass breakups in 2002, earning second-team All-Mountain West honors for the second consecutive year. He majored in sociology at Utah.

== Professional career ==
=== Buffalo Bills ===
Sape was selected by the Buffalo Bills in the sixth round, with the 187th overall pick, of the 2003 NFL draft. He officially signed with the team on June 11, 2003. He played in one game for the Bills in 2003. Sape was waived on September 5, 2004, but signed to the practice squad on September 7, 2004. He signed a reserve/future contract with the Bills on January 8, 2005. He played in nine games during the 2005 season, recording seven solo tackles, one assisted tackle and one fumble recovery. Sape was placed on injured reserve on December 16, 2005. He was waived/injured by the Bills on September 2, 2006, and reverted to injured reserve the next day. He was waived on September 4, 2006.

=== Berlin Thunder ===
Sape was selected by the Berlin Thunder of NFL Europa in the second round of the 2007 NFL Europa Free Agent Draft. He appeared in seven games for the Thunder during the 2007 NFL Europa season, accumulating 16 tackles, 0.5 sacks and two pass breakups.

=== Oakland Raiders ===
Sape signed with the Oakland Raiders on June 29, 2007. He was waived on July 28, 2007.

=== Tennessee Titans ===
Sape was signed by the Tennessee Titans on August 3, 2007. He was waived/injured on September 1, 2007, reverting to injured reserve the following day. He was waived by the Titans on September 3, 2007.

=== New Orleans VooDoo ===
Sape signed with the New Orleans VooDoo of the Arena Football League (AFL) on November 7, 2007. He was placed on refuse to report on February 4, 2008, but was activated on February 13. He recorded seven solo tackles, one assisted tackle, one sack and one fumble recovery for the VooDoo in 2008. Sape was waived on April 14, 2008.

=== Colorado Crush ===
Sape was signed by the Colorado Crush of the AFL on April 30, 2008. He totaled three solo tackles, one assisted tackle, one sack, one fumble recovery and one pass breakup for the Crush during the 2008 season.

=== Las Vegas Locomotives ===
Sape was signed by the Las Vegas Locomotives of the United Football League (UFL) on August 31, 2009. He appeared in five games, starting one, in 2009, recording seven tackles. He was part of the Locomotives team that won the UFL championship in 2009. Sape was protected by the Locomotives for the 2010 season. After playing for the Utah Blaze during the UFL offseason, Sape returned to the Locomotives for the 2010 UFL season. He played in seven games, starting four, for the Locomotives in 2010, totaling 13 tackles. The Locomotives won the UFL championship for the second straight year in 2010. He appeared in four games in 2011, recording two tackles and one sack. The Locomotives advanced to the championship game for the third straight season in 2011 but lost this time.

=== Utah Blaze ===
Sape was assigned to the Utah Blaze of the AFL on April 6, 2010. He accumulated eight solo tackles, nine assisted tackles and one sack for the Blaze in 2010.

After playing two seasons for the Locomoties of the UFL, Sape was assigned to the Blaze again on May 24, 2012. He was placed on the suspended list on June 19 and activated on July 2, 2012.
