= Lee Buenconsejo-Lum =

American general practitioner and academic administrator

- Education: Stanford University; University of Hawaiʻi at Mānoa
- Scientific career
- Fields: Family medicine, community health
- Workplaces: University of Hawaiʻi at Mānoa

Lee Buenconsejo-Lum is an American general practitioner and academic administrator who served as the interim dean of the John A. Burns School of Medicine at the University of Hawaiʻi at Mānoa from 2023 to 2025. She is the Satoru Izutsu Endowed Professor of family medicine and community health.

== Life ==
Buenconsejo-Lum attended Leilehua High School. She earned a B.S. in biological sciences from Stanford University. She received a M.D. from the John A. Burns School of Medicine (JABSOM) at the University of Hawaiʻi at Mānoa. She completed a family medicine residency and a faculty development fellowship at JABSOM.

Buenconsejo-Lum is a general practitioner specialized in the prevention of cervical cancer and reducing health disparities. She is board certified in family medicine. She joined JABSOM in 1994 as a clinical teaching assistant in the department of family medicine and community health. She joined the Kapiolani Medical Center and Pali Momi Medical Center in 2005 and 2015 respectively. Buenconsejo-Lum is a fellow American Academy of Family Physicians. She is the Satoru Izutsu Endowed Professor in the department of family medicine and community health.

Buenconsejo-Lum is the JABSOM associate dean for academic affairs and director of graduate medical education. She succeeded Jerris Hedges as the acting dean of JABSOM from January 1 to February 28, 2023. She became the interim dean on March 1, 2023. She is the first woman of Filipino descent to serve in the role. As of January 2024, she is one of three finalists to permanently assume the role of dean.
