= Itsuko Sue Nishikawa =

Itsuko "Sue" Nishikawa pioneered Southern Baptist faith and values in the territory and State of Hawaii in the latter half of the 20th century.

== Early life ==
Nishikawa was born Itsuko Saito to Masanari Saito and Tei Saito née Shida, immigrants to Hawaii from Fukushima, Japan. She grew up in the small agricultural town of Wahiawa on the island of Oahu in the United States territory of Hawaii, the second oldest of eight siblings: five girls and three boys. Her father, Masanari, was a relatively successful pineapple grower, until the Great Depression caused him to lose his holdings. To support herself through high school, Itsuko began working as a maid for an officer in the United States Army at the age of thirteen, a job that included room and board.

While living in Wahiawa, she began her involvement in the Baptist Church as a member of Wayside Baptist Chapel, which later became the First Baptist Church of Wahiawa.

After graduating from Leilehua High School in Central Oahu, Itsuko left for Texas to attend the Southwestern Baptist Theological Seminary. After completing her studies, she returned home and organized the Women's Missionary Union in Hawaii, becoming its first director in 1954. Nishikawa served in that post for twenty-seven years until her retirement in 1980. During her tenure, she worked closely with the Baptist World Alliance, and edited the state Baptist newspaper, Hawaii Baptist.

== Post-retirement ==
Nishikawa's involvement with the Hawaii Baptist Church continued after her retirement and in the twenty-four years between stepping down as director of the Women's Missionary Union and her death, knowledge of her work with the Baptist Church became more well-known around the Pacific. She was a frequent invited speaker, where her lectures often emphasized the importance of mission work.

== Death ==
After a brief illness, Nishikawa died in October 2004. Her memorial service was held at Olivet Baptist Church in Honolulu.

== Recognition ==
=== Hawaii Pacific Missions Offering ===
In 1981, the state's annual missions offering was named after her. Each year, the "Sue Nishikawa Offering" raises funds to support Pacific ministry. Every September, Southern Baptist Churches across Hawaii, Guam, American Samoa and Okinawa voluntarily collect donations. The funds support activities across the Asia-Pacific region.

=== Sue Nishikawa College Scholarship ===
Hawaii Baptist Academy offers an annual scholarship to a female member of the senior class in honor of Nishikawa.

=== Hymnal Tribute ===
Composer John Hom wrote a song performed in church services at Nu'uanu Baptist Church detailing the life of Nishikawa and explaining the Sue Nishikawa Offering. The song uses the same melody and a similar refrain to the song "Fate Yanagi" performed by well-known Hawaiian musician and comedian Rap Reiplinger.
