= Joyce Sachiko Tsunoda =

American college administrator (born 1938)

Joyce Sachiko Tsunoda (née, Nishimura; born 1 January 1938) is an American college administrator who served as the Chancellor for the University of Hawaiʻi community colleges for 20 years. She was the "first Asian American woman to serve as the chancellor of a multi-campus community college system".

== Biography ==
=== Early life ===
Tsunoda was born in Osaka, Japan in 1938. Her father, Yukio Nishimura, was a professional baseball player with the Hanshin Tigers, and her mother, Edith Sueko Higashi, who was a Nisei who grew up in Hawaii. Tsunoda has three younger sisters. Her father earned a position at a company in Manchuria before World War II, and the family lived there. When the war broke out, her father was drafted and died in the Philippines. Once the family made it back to Japan, Tsunoda's mother decided to move the family to Hawaii, where she was sure could make a living. Tsunoda easily adjusted to living in America, and became a citizen in 1952. She was the valedictorian of Leilehua High School when she graduated in 1956.

=== Education ===
Tsunoda earned a bachelor's degree in chemistry in 1960 from the University of Hawaiʻi. While working on her undergraduate degree, she met Peter Tsunoda, and the two married after they graduated. They had two daughters. In 1966 she earned a PhD in Biochemistry.

=== Career ===
After graduating from college, Tsunoda tried to get a faculty position at the University of Hawaiʻi's flagship Manoa campus, but failed to do so. Tsunoda's career in the University of Hawaii system began in 1968 when she worked with architects to design Leeward Community College and created its chemistry program. She held several different positions at Leeward Community College until she became the provost of Kapiʻolani Community College in 1976. Tsunoda became the chancellor of the entire University of Hawaii Community College system. In addition to serving as chancellor of the University of Hawaiʻi community colleges, she has been a special adviser on international affairs to the university.

While participating in campus leadership positions, she advocated for equal budgets, more equitable teaching loads, and consistent position titles between the Manoa campus and the community colleges. At the time, the Manoa campus had a larger budget than all of the community colleges combined despite the community colleges serving more students.

Tsunoda retired in 2003. Throughout her career, she was awarded the Organization of Women Leaders' "Outstanding award in public/private partnership" (1988); the YWCA's "Outstanding Individual in Education" award (1990), and the University of Hawaii Alumni Association's "Outstanding Community Service and Distinguished Alumna" award (1990).

== Sources ==
- Yount, David (1996). Who Runs the University?: The Politics of Higher Education in Hawaii, 1985-1992. Honolulu, Hawaii: University of Hawaiʻi Press. ISBN 0824818210.
- Zhao, Xiaojian; Park, Edward J. W. (26 November 2013). Asian Americans: An Encyclopedia of Social, Cultural, Economic, and Political History. ABC-CLIO. ISBN 978-1-59884-240-1.
