= Netane Muti =

Tongan gridiron football player (born 1999)

Profile
- Position: Guard

Personal information
- Born: 27 March 1999 (age 27); Nukuʻalofa, Tonga
- Listed height: 6 ft 3 in (1.91 m)
- Listed weight: 325 lb (147 kg)

Career information
- High school: Leilehua (Wahiawa, Hawaii, U.S.)
- College: Fresno State (2016–2019)
- NFL draft: 2020: 6th round, 181st overall pick

Career history
- Denver Broncos (2020–2022); Las Vegas Raiders (2022–2023); Detroit Lions (2024–2025)

Career NFL statistics as of 2025
- Games played: 22
- Games started: 4
- Stats at Pro Football Reference

Netane Muti (born 27 March 1999) is a Tongan professional American football guard. He played college football for the Fresno State Bulldogs.

== Early life ==
A two-way lineman for Leilehua, Muti was not highly recruited coming out of high school. He originally committed to play for his home state's Hawaii Rainbow Warriors, signing a letter of intent with the University of Hawai'i on National Signing Day. However, after his application was put on hold due to a test score, he asked for and was granted release from U.H. and went on to sign with Fresno State.

== College career ==
Muti redshirted in his first season at Fresno State following an Achilles injury suffered in preseason.

In 2017, as a redshirt freshman, Muti started all 14 games, as a member of an offensive line which ranked third in the nation in sacks and tackles for loss allowed. For his performance, he received Honorable Mention All-Mountain West Conference honors.

In 2018, his campaign was cut short by a season-ending Achilles injury suffered in the third game of the season.

In 2019, as a redshirt junior, he was again struck by injury, as a season-ending Lisfranc foot injury sidelined him for the final nine games of the year.

In January 2020, despite having played only five full games over the previous two seasons, Muti announced that he would forgo his final season of college eligibility and declare for the 2020 NFL draft.

Muti was cleared by doctors at the 2020 NFL Scouting Combine, where his bench press was the highest total at the 2020 NFL Scouting Combine.

== Professional career ==
Pre-draft measurables
Height	Weight	Arm length	Hand span	Bench press
6 ft 2 7/8 in (1.90 m)	315 lb (143 kg)	31 3/4 in (0.81 m)	10 5/8 in (0.27 m)	44 reps
All values from NFL Combine

=== Denver Broncos ===
Muti was selected by the Denver Broncos with the 181st overall pick in the sixth round of the 2020 NFL Draft. He was placed on the active/non-football injury list at the start of training camp on 28 July 2020, and he was moved back to the active roster six days later.

On 30 August 2022, Muti was waived by the Broncos and signed to the practice squad the next day.

=== Las Vegas Raiders ===
On 13 December 2022, Muti was signed by the Las Vegas Raiders off the Broncos practice squad.

On 9 March 2023, Muti re-signed with the Raiders. He was waived on 29 August 2023 and re-signed to the practice squad. He was not among the players the team re-signed to reserve/future contracts after the season, and thus he became a free agent upon the expiration of his practice squad contract.

=== Detroit Lions ===
On 6 February 2024, Muti signed a reserve/future contract with the Detroit Lions. He was placed on injured reserve on August 1.

On August 26, 2025, Muti was released by the Lions as part of final roster cuts. On November 5, he was re-signed to the practice squad. On December 1, Muti was released.

== Personal life ==
Muti was born and raised in Tonga (where he learned to play rugby) before later moving to Wahiawa, Hawaii where he started to play football
