= Ernest Higa =

American businessman

Ernest Higa (October 15, 1952–) is an entrepreneur who founded the Domino's Pizza franchise in Japan.

Higa was born on October 15, 1952, in Honolulu, Hawaii. He is of Okinawan descent. His father is Yetsuo Higa and his sister is Merle Aiko Okawara. He graduated from Columbia University.

Higa founded the first Japanese Domino's Pizza branch in 1985. He is a member of Keizai Dōyukai, a major Japanese business group. In December 2011 he helped Wendy's return to Japan.
