= Lake Higa =

Lake in Burkina Faso

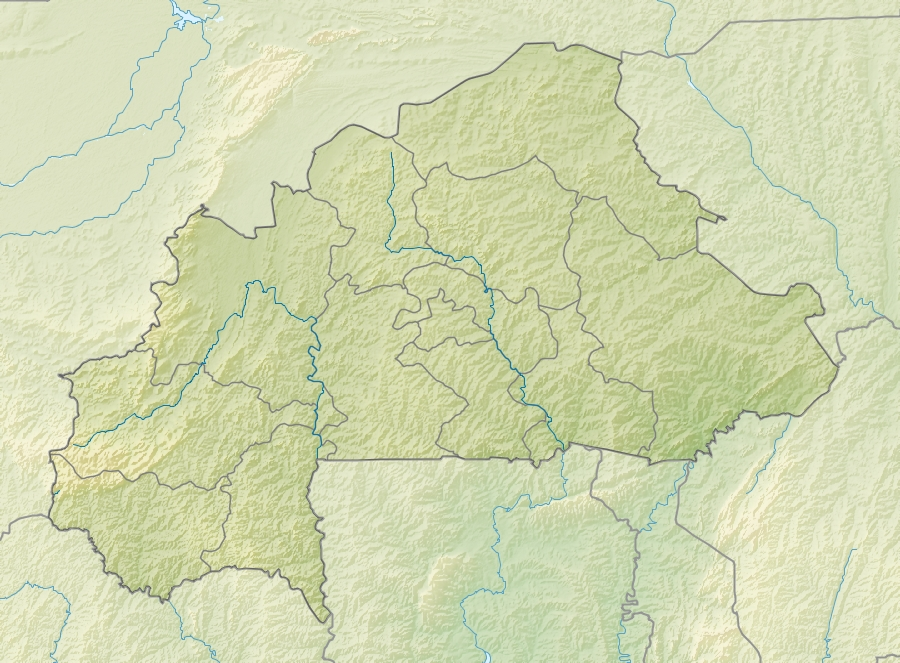
- Location within Burkina Faso
- Location: Burkina Faso
- Coordinates: 13.613622°N 0.721664°E
- Primary outflows: Babangou
- Basin countries: Burkina Faso
- Surface area: 228 ha (560 acres)
- Surface elevation: 271 m (889 ft)

Ramsar Wetland
- Official name: Lac Higa
- Designated: 7 October 2009
- Reference no.: 1883

Lake Higa is a small lake in eastern Burkina Faso, close to the border with Niger. It drains into the Babangou, which drains into the Niger. It has an area of 228 ha. It lies at an elevation of 271 m (889 feet). In 2009 the site around Lake Higa was included in the List of Ramsar wetlands of international importance.
