= Naval Computer and Telecommunications Area Master Station Pacific =

Shore command of the U.S. Navy

Coordinates: 21.5209194°N 157.9953395°W

- Entrance sign at the Main Gate of NCTAMS PAC, Hawaii
- Active: 1906-present
- Country: United States of America
- Branch: United States Navy
- Type: Shore command
- Role: Communications Support
- Size: 760
- Nickname(s): NCTAMS PAC
- Decorations: Secretary of the Navy Letter of Commendation (September 1999-May 2001)

Commanders
- Commanding Officer: Captain Jaime Hill
- Notable commanders: RDML Lillian E. Fishburne (Ret.)

The Naval Computer and Telecommunications Area Master Station Pacific (abbreviated NCTAMS PAC) is a United States Navy facility in Wahiawa, Hawaii that provides operational direction and management to all Pacific Naval Telecommunication System users.

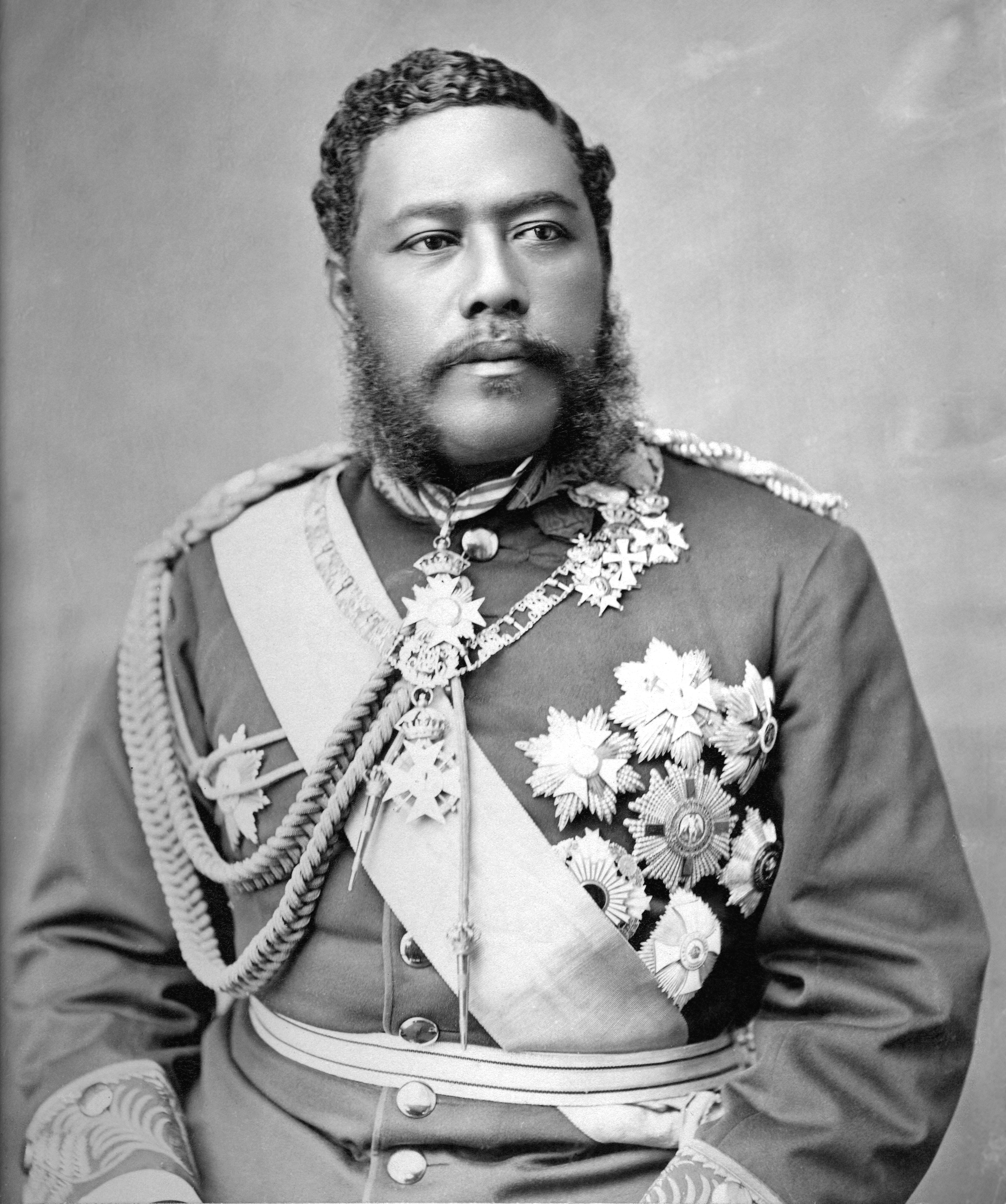
Hawaiian King Kalākaua granted the U.S. the exclusive rights to enter and develop a coaling station in 1888.

In addition to its primary function, NCTAMSPAC also manages, operates, and maintains Defense Communication System and Naval Telecommunication System assets, and offers a full range of ADP and information resource services, maintenance and repair, and communication/electronic and Defense Message System coordination to the United States Navy and other United States Department of Defense (DoD) activities in the Pacific.

It is mostly located on Oahu. It got its current name on October 20, 1997, when it was renamed to clarify its operating area. According to author Bruce Jones, as of 2022 it was the largest telecommunications facility in the world.

== History ==
=== Before World War II ===
In May 1888, the United States established a coaling station to service the vessels of the Pacific Fleet in Pearl Harbor, Hawaii. King David Kalākaua had granted the U.S. the exclusive rights to enter and develop the area earlier that year.

The U.S. Naval Radio Station in the Pearl Harbor area, the first government station in the islands, began operations on October 1, 1906. This radio station continued its operation until its deactivation in 1916.

On March 3, 1915, the United States Congress passed an Appropriations Act that authorized $400,000 for the construction of a high-powered, long distance radio station at Pearl Harbor. In 1916, this new station, NPM, began operations at Hospital Point, Pearl Harbor. At 0230 on the morning of September 20, 1916, Captain Clark, the first Commandant of the 14th Naval District, sent the following message from the NPM to the Naval Radio Station, Long Beach, California:

"SECRETARY OF THE NAVY, WASHINGTON, D.C. I HAVE THE HONOR TO SEND YOU THE FIRST THROUGH MESSAGE TO WASHINGTON, D.C., FROM PEARL HARBOR, HAWAII RADIO STATION, AND CAN REPORT SATISFACTORY PROGRESS OF THE PLANT. GEORGE R. CLARK SENDS."

A congratulatory message from the Secretary of the Navy arrived 33 minutes later. During the years following World War I, the naval activities in the Pearl Harbor area continued to expand. It soon became obvious that the future expansion of the radio station facilities in the area would not be practical. In 1933, a tract of land at Lualualei was set aside by the territory of Hawaii for use by the U.S. Navy. Seven self-supporting steel towers were erected to a height of 610 feet (190 m) at this new site for an antenna system for long wave radio transmitting. The site was officially activated in 1936, and by 1941 twelve transmitters were in operation.

=== World War II ===
With the arrival of the major United States Pacific Fleet units at Pearl Harbor naval base in 1939, it became increasingly clear that a new receiver and control station was needed. Therefore, a secluded spot at Wahiawa, some 20 miles (32 km) north of Pearl Harbor, was chosen and purchased by the Navy for approximately one million dollars. Construction began on the 697.2 acres (2.821 km^{2}) of land in 1940 and was scheduled to be completed in 1942. During that time, the station at Wahiawa was considered the most important of a number of Naval Radio and Air Stations being constructed as a part of a general expansion program.

On December 7, 1941, a few minutes before 0800, several squadrons of Japanese aircraft passed over the Lualualei Transmitter Site on their way to bomb Pearl Harbor. The major Naval Radio Stations were strafed by these planes as they passed over, but casualties among the communications personnel were light; however, the radio stations themselves proved highly vulnerable to attack. Lualualei was located only 4,000 yards (3,700 m) from the shoreline and received its power over exposed land lines from the Hawaiian Electric Company, 22 miles (35 km) away. The radio facility at Wailupe, also along the seacoast, was deemed unprotectable. So, on the morning of December 10, it was decided to have all of the equipment at Wailupe moved to the new site at Wahiawa.

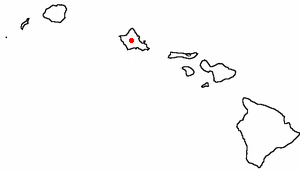
Location of NCTAMS PAC at Wahiawā, Hawaii

This new site was an excellent receiving area and the best-protected radio station on the island. Men worked day and night to transfer operations to Wahiawa and on December 17 the relocation was completed without the slightest interruption in communications service. This location became known as the Naval Radio Station, Wahiawa. Shortly thereafter, the Security Group Unit was also moved from Heeia to Wahiawa.

To improve naval communications in the Pacific area, a Communications Security Unit (COMSEC) was established at Wahiawa in 1942 under the management and control of the Chief of Naval Operations (CNO). Their purpose was to assist in a program of cryptographic security, message traffic control and message traffic analysis.

It became apparent after the war that the naval communication facilities in Hawaii could never revert to their small pre-war status, but would have to continue in the role of "big business."

=== After World War II ===
Shortly after the war, a committee was appointed by the CNO to make a survey of the facilities at Wahiawa and to make the appropriate recommendations concerning the location of the central point of radio communications. The committee decided that the central point should return to Pearl Harbor and that Wahiawa be relegated to a receiver site. However, in 1956, it was decided that insufficient space existed in the Pearl Harbor area to permit the continued expansion of communications facilities on Oahu. In addition, the various components were scattered throughout the Pearl Harbor complex which made the operation highly uneconomic and difficult to supervise. It was decided to relocate the central point back to the Wahiawa site.

Because the requirements for rapid communications from the Department of the Navy to the fleet operational commanders had changed, the CNO authorized the activation of an additional teletypewriter system. This system, known as HICOM, was activated in 1957 and operated parallel to the existing communications channels. Later, the Commander in Chief, U.S. Pacific Fleet (CINCPACFLT), established an additional parallel circuit known as the "Atomic Strike Coordinator Circuit." It was determined that even more rapid communications would be necessary. Therefore, a new communications net, known as the "Naval Operation Net" was formed in 1959. At the same time, the Navy decided that the stations at Haiku and Heeia were no longer needed. The station at Heeia was turned over to the Marine corps Air Station at Kaneohe, while the Haiku station was placed in a non-operational status.

The communication stations on Oahu underwent a consolidation in 1967. The message centers at Pearl Harbor (NAVSHIPYD), Makalapa (CINCPACFLT), Camp Smith (CINCPAC), Moanalua (FLEWEACEN), Secure Voice Pearl Harbor, and Consolidated Maintenance came under an Officer-in-Charge, which was known as NAVCOMMACTS Pearl Harbor. NAVCOMMACTS Pearl Harbor was a department of NAVCOMMSTA Honolulu who exercised administrative and operational control. The message center at Barbers Point also came under the control of NAVCOMMSTA Honolulu at the same time.

The Makalapa Local Digital Message Exchange (LDMX) was activated in March 1973 by Vice Admiral G. C. Talle, Deputy CINCPACFLT. The system's activation marked a significant step forward by improving writer-to-reader speed of service, message formatting, routing indicator assignment, and message recall for CINCPACFLT. In September 1977, the NAVCOMMACTS Pearl Harbor was disestablished and NTCC Camp Smith, NTCC Makalapa, NTCC Pearl Harbor, Secure Voice, and Consolidated Maintenance became separate departments of NAVCOMMSTA Honolulu. Concurrently, NTCC Moanalua was disestablished and the communication functions were turned over to the Fleet Weather Center.

In December 1977, NTCC Pearl Harbor was disestablished and absorbed into NTCC Makalapa in an ongoing effort to consolidate communications on Oahu. Subsequently, in February 1978, NTCC Makalapa, located in the basement of the CINCPACFLT headquarters building at Makalapa, became officially known as NTCC Pearl Harbor. The Commanding Officer of NAVCOMMSTA Honolulu transmitted the first message, via the LDMX system, in a ceremony marking the transformation of the CINCPAC Telecommunications Center at Camp H.M. Smith from Joint operation to Navy management in September 1973.

In April 1976, the Naval Communications Station Honolulu was officially renamed Naval Communication Area Master Station, Eastern Pacific (NAVCAMS EASTPAC).

The Navy's Satellite Facility at Wahiawa.

On February 18, 1977, the Commanding Officer at NAVCAMS EASTPAC officially dedicated the new Super High Frequency (SHF) Satellite Facility at Wahiawa, the largest such facility of its kind. Concurrently, the Navy's Satellite Facility at Helemano was deactivated. NTCC Ford Island became a department of NAVCAMS EASTPAC in October 1983.

On December 1, 1990, NAVCAMS EASTPAC and NARDAC Pearl Harbor merged to form the Naval Computer and Telecommunications Area Master Station, Eastern Pacific (NCTAMS EASTPAC). This merger took place to ensure that the Navy could meet the challenges of technological changes and advances.

The command was again renamed on October 20, 1997. The new name, Naval Computer and Telecommunications Area Master Station, Pacific, better reflected the command's regional operating area. The former NCTAMS WESTPAC was redesignated Naval Computer and Telecommunications Station Guam, now falling under NCTAMS PAC.
