= Merle Aiko Okawara =

Japanese-American businesswoman

Merle Aiko Okawara (大河原 愛子) (November 15, 1941-) is a Japanese American businesswoman. She has worked at the top of major companies like JC Foods, Avon Products, and eBay.

== Early life and education ==
Okawara was born Merle Higa on November 15, 1941, in Honolulu, Hawaii. Her father, Yetsuo Higa, was a businessman known for bringing Pepsi to Japan. Ernest Higa is her brother. She attended Punahou School, and when she was 15 years old she and her family moved to Japan. She returned to the United States to attend Northwestern University, then went to Europe to study law at the University of Geneva.

== Career ==
After graduating from the University of Geneva in 1964, Okawara returned to Japan and worked as an interpreter in French and English (her Japanese wasn't very strong at the time). She had difficulty finding work as a lawyer, so she entered business. Her father and a Californian businessman were working to bring pizza to Japan, but Higa gave Merle the business for a year. The business steadily grew as Japanese people became more familiar with Western foods. She got supermarket chains to sell pizza in their stores, and in 1970 she got pizza added to Royal Host's menu. During her time at JC Foods, she successfully grew the business to include six factories in multiple prefectures. The company was also the first to be publicly listed by a woman in Japan.

Okawara became the chairwoman of JC Foods, a director at Avon Products, and the president of several other food companies. She also served as the CEO of eBay's Japanese branch. She sits on the board of directors for several organizations and is also part of the business advisory council of UNOPS. She also won several awards.
