= American football in Japan =

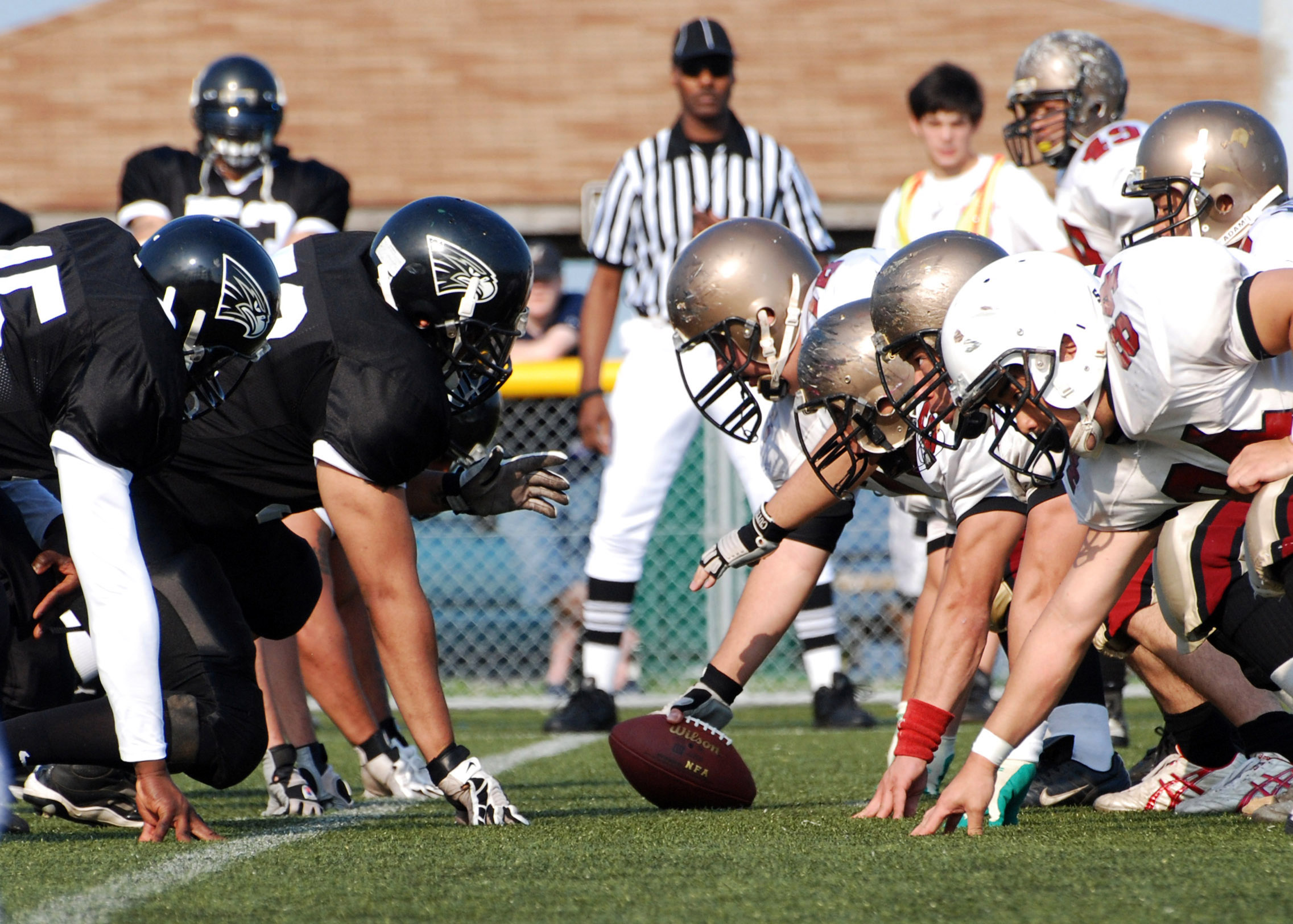
The Yokosuka Seahawks taking on the Yokohama Harbors at Yokosuka Field in 2009

American football was introduced to Japan in the 1930s.

== History ==
American football was introduced in the early 1930s, when Paul Rusch, a teacher and missionary from Kentucky, who came to Japan in 1925 to help rebuild following the 1923 earthquake, George Marshall, an athletic teacher at Tokyo based Rikkyo University, and two military attaches at the US embassy, Alexander George and Merritt Booth, helped to form the first football teams at three universities in Tokyo (Waseda, Meiji, Rikkyo). In November 1934, the first football game was played between an all-star team of the three Tokyo universities and a team of the Yokohama Country and Athletic Club consisting of Americans and Britons living in Japan. The Japanese college team won the game. In 1937, a game between college all-star teams from eastern and western Japan drew a crowd of about 25,000 spectators.

During World War II (1939–1945), American football in Japan came to a halt. However, soon after the war, football in Japan resumed. Rusch, who had earlier left Japan for the war, returned in 1945. During the following years, high school and junior high school teams were formed.

The 1970s saw American college football teams visiting Japan. In 1971, a Utah State University team led by coach Chuck Mills and future NFL quarterback Tony Adams played two exhibition matches against Japanese All-Star teams, winning by wide margins in both games. Brigham Young University played two exhibition contests in 1977, also against Japanese All-Star teams, with the American side again winning handily both times. The Cougars returned to Japan the following season to play an official regular season game against UNLV; All-American quarterback Marc Wilson threw 3 touchdown passes to lead BYU to a 28-24 victory in front of a crowd of 27,500 at Yokohama Stadium.

From 1977 to 1993, a regular season game between American college teams was played in Japan, initially sponsored by Mitsubishi and known as the Mirage Bowl. The name was changed to "Coca-Cola Classic" in 1986 to reflect the game's new corporate sponsor at that time. Grambling State University defeated Temple University 35-32 in the initial game, held at Korakuen Stadium, with Grambling quarterback Doug Williams being named MVP. The annual game was moved to the Tokyo Dome in 1988, with Heisman Trophy winner Barry Sanders rushing for 332 yards and 4 touchdowns for Oklahoma State University that year against Texas Tech University, thus finishing the season with NCAA single-season records of 2,628 rushing yards and 39 touchdowns. Another record-breaking performance came in 1990, when David Klingler of the University of Houston passed for a single-game record 716 yards in a 62-45 victory over Arizona State University.

Today, more than 17,000 players participate in a national competition for about 400 teams. There are two college football leagues, the Kanto League with teams from eastern Japan and the Kansai League with teams from western Japan. Each league has different divisions. The Division I of the Kanto League has two Conferences (A and B). The champions of the two leagues battle for the college championship in the Koshien Bowl.

The highest level of American Football in Japan is the X-League, the league consisting of true company teams and club teams sponsored by companies. The company league was founded in 1981; since 1996, it has been called the X-League. Like the college leagues, the X-League has different divisions. The Division I has three regional divisions (East, Central, West). The two top teams of each division advance to the playoffs, called the Final 6. The championship game is called Japan X Bowl and is held in December. The X-League champion then plays against the college champion in the Rice Bowl for the Japanese national championship.

== Organization ==
=== Professional ===
The X-League is the highest level of football in Japan. In recent years, professionals from overseas have played in the X-League, including former NFL quarterback Devin Gardner.

=== University and collegiate ===
College football in Japan, often played at the club level, is made up of eight leagues, spanning all four islands. The East and West champions play in the annual Koshien Bowl in Nishinomiya.

==== East (東日本) ====
- Kantoh Collegiate American Football Association
- Hokkaido American Football Association
- Tohoku Collegiate American Football Association

==== West (西日本) ====
- Chushikoku Collegiate American Football Association
- Hokuriku Collegiate American Football League
- Kansai Collegiate American Football League
- Kyūshū Collegiate American Football Association
- Tokai Collegiate American Football Association

The winners of the Japan X Bowl and Koshien Bowl play each other in the Rice Bowl.
