= Wahiawā, Hawaii =

Census-designated place in Hawaii, United States

Wahiawā
- Census-designated place
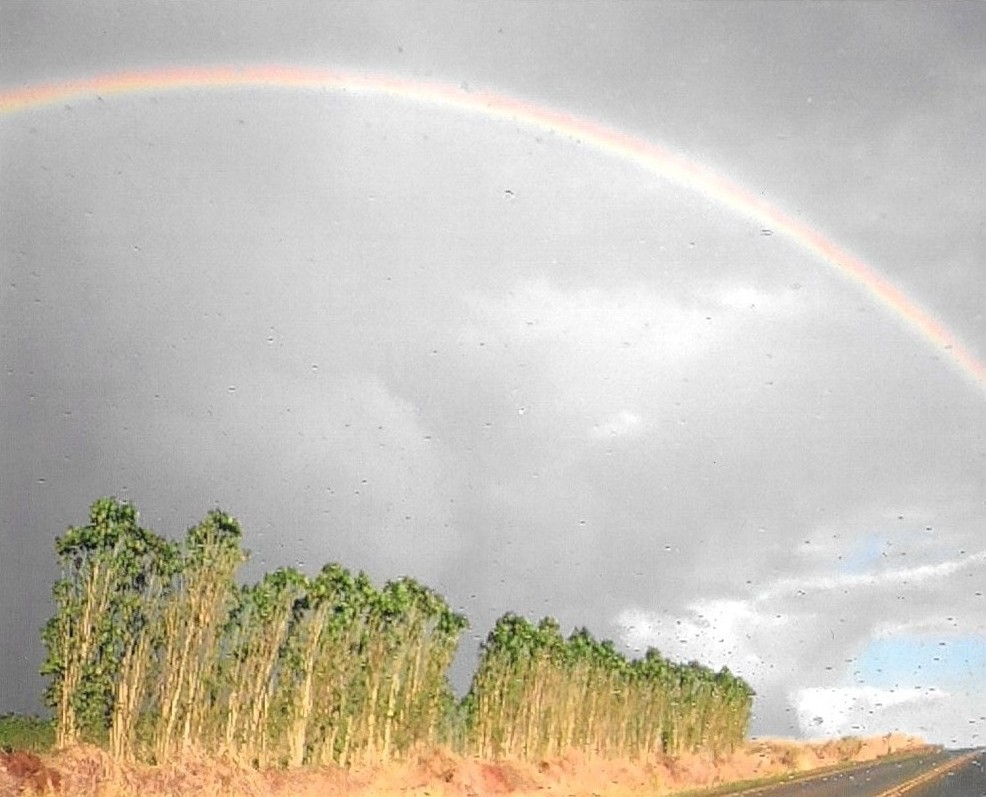
- Rainbow in Wahiawā

- Location in Honolulu County and the state of Hawaii
- Coordinates: 21°30′9″N 158°1′23″W
- Country: United States
- State: Hawaii

Area
  - Total: 2.54 sq mi (6.58 km^{2})
  - Land: 2.29 sq mi (5.93 km^{2})
  - Water: 0.25 sq mi (0.65 km^{2})
- Elevation: 942 ft (287 m)

Population (2020)
  - Total: 18,658
  - Density: 8,150.5/sq mi (3,146.91/km^{2})
- Time zone: UTC-10 (Hawaii-Aleutian)
- ZIP code: 96786
- Area code: 808
- FIPS code: 15-72650
- GNIS feature ID: 0364420

Wahiawā (Hawaiian pronunciation: [wəhijəˈvaː]) is a census-designated place (CDP) in Honolulu County, Hawaii, United States, on the island of Oahu. It is in the Wahiawā District, on the plateau or "central valley" between the two volcanic mountains that bookend the island. In Hawaiian, wahi a wā means "place of the wa people". The population was 18,658 at the 2020 census.

Lakes and reservoirs are rare in Hawaii, and Wahiawā is unique in being surrounded on three sides by Lake Wilson (also known as Wahiawā Reservoir or Kaukonahua). The town must be reached by either of two bridges on Kamehameha Highway (State Rte. 80) across the reservoir's narrow north and south arms. Outside of the reservoir, the town used to be surrounded by military bases and agricultural fields, but development is making its way up from the increasingly urbanized southern portion of the central plain. Still, there are significant U.S. Army facilities in the area, including Schofield Barracks, Wheeler Army Airfield, and East Range, an Army training area extending into the hills south and east of town. Schofield Barracks alone is larger than Wahiawā CDP. Wahiawā is also home to the United States Navy's Naval Computer and Telecommunications Area Master Station Pacific and the housing community HMR.

The U.S. postal codes for Wahiawā are 96786 and 96857.

== Geography ==
Wahiawā is located at 21°30′9″N 158°1′23″W (21.502574, -158.022938).

Vehicular routes to the North Shore from Wahiawā are Kamehameha Highway (State Rte. 80) to Haleʻiwa and Kaukonahua Road (State Rte. 801) to Waialua. Wheeler and Schofield are reached along Wilikina Drive (Wahiawā Bypass) (State Rte. 99), which bypasses Wahiawā from the south bridge, a road that eventually connects to both Kamehameha Highway and Kaukonahua Road northwest of town. Kamehameha Highway continues south (as State Rte. 99) past Wheeler to Mililani Town. Interstate H-2 terminates at Wilikina Drive near the Kamehameha Highway intersection, and is a less congested route southward to Mililani and beyond to Pearl City and Honolulu via Interstate H-1. Kunia Road (State Rte. 750) runs from Wilikina Drive, between Schofield and Wheeler (on the bypass), then southward along the mostly still agricultural western side of the plain to Kunia and Waipahu beyond.

According to the United States Census Bureau, the CDP has an area of 2.4 square miles (6.2 km^{2}), of which 2.1 square miles (5.5 km^{2}) is land and 0.27 square miles (0.7 km^{2}), or 11.34%, is water.

Kaʻala, the highest peak on Oahu (4,003 feet or 1,220 metres), is 5 miles (8 km) west of Wahiawā, overlooking Schofield Barracks.

Wahiawā Reservoir or Lake Wilson is Hawaii's second-largest reservoir (302 acres (1.22 km^{2})). It irrigates agricultural fields, including the Dole Pineapple Plantation fields at the northern part of Wahiawā, all the way to Oahu's North Shore, where it empties.

== Demographics ==
Historical population
Census	Pop.	Note	%±
2020	18,658		—
U.S. Decennial Census

As of the census of 2000, there were 16,151 people, 5,376 households, and 3,956 families residing in the CDP. The population density was 7,642.8 inhabitants per square mile (2,950.9/km^{2}). There were 5,900 housing units at an average density of 2,791.9 per square mile (1,078.0/km^{2}). The racial makeup of the CDP was 11.31% White, 2.02% Black or African American, 0.32% Native American, 45.77% Asian, 9.62% Pacific Islander, 1.83% from other races, and 29.14% from two or more races. 11.00% of the population were Hispanic or Latino of any race.

There were 5,376 households, of which 31.3% had children under the age of 18 living with them, 49.2% were married couples living together, 18.0% had a female householder with no husband present, and 26.4% were non-families. 21.9% of all households were made up of individuals, and 10.5% had someone living alone who was 65 years of age or older. The average household size was 2.97 and the average family size was 3.45.

In the CDP the population was spread out, with 26.1% under the age of 18, 8.6% from 18 to 24, 26.6% from 25 to 44, 19.9% from 45 to 64, and 18.8% who were 65 years of age or older. The median age was 38. For every 100 females there were 94.6 males. For every 100 females 18 and over, there were 91.4 males.

The median income for a household in the CDP was $41,257, and the median income for a family was $46,524. Males had a median income of $32,018 versus $25,287 for females. The per capita income for the CDP was $16,366. 16.7% of the population and 13.5% of families were below the poverty line. Of the total population, 23.8% of those under 18 and 9.9% of those 65 and older were living below the poverty line.

== Government and infrastructure ==
The Honolulu Police Department operates the Wahiawā Substation in Wahiawā.

A satellite gateway for the Iridium satellite phone network is operated by the DISA in Wahiawā.

In the Hawaii State Legislature, Wahiawā is part of Hawaii State House of Representatives district 46 (currently represented by Amy Perruso) and Hawaii State Senate district 22 (currently represented by Donovan Dela Cruz.) In the Honolulu City Council, Wahiawā is part of district 2 (currently represented by Matt Weyer).

== Schools ==
=== Public schools ===
The Hawaiʻi State Department of Education operates Wahiawā CDP's public schools.

Elementary schools in the CDP include ʻIliahi, Kaʻala, and Wahiawā. Wahiawā Middle School is adjacent to but not in the CDP, while Leilehua High School is in the CDP.

Five other schools have Wahiawā postal addresses but are outside the CDP: Samuel K. Solomon Elementary School and Daniel K. Inouye (formerly Hale Kula) Elementary School in Schofield Barracks CDP, Helemano Elementary School in Whitmore Village CDP, and Major Sheldon Wheeler Elementary School and Major Sheldon Wheeler Middle School in the Wheeler Air Force Base CDP and on Wheeler Army Airfield.

=== Private schools ===
Elementary schools

- Trinity Lutheran Church and School (Lutheran) (in the CDP)
- First Baptist Church
- Hoʻala School
- Abundant Life United Pent Church
- Maranatha Christian Academy
- Hawaii Matsuritaiko

== Bridges ==
- Karsten Thot Bridge (truss bridge, 1932)
- Kaukonahua Bridge (1944)
- Wilson Bridge

== Notable people ==
- Al Harris, professional football player
- Betty Ann Bruno, child actor and journalist
- Martin Iosefo, professional rugby player with the U.S. national rugby team
- Lia Marie Johnson, actress, singer and YouTube personality
- Adrian Murrell, professional football player
- Netane Muti, professional football player
- Kealoha Pilares, professional football player
- Lauvale Sape, professional football player
- Antonio Taguba, military general
- Charles Tuaau, professional football player
- Suzanne Vares-Lum, president, East-West Center
- Tadashi Wakabayashi, professional baseball player
- Corinne Watanabe, judge

== Gallery ==
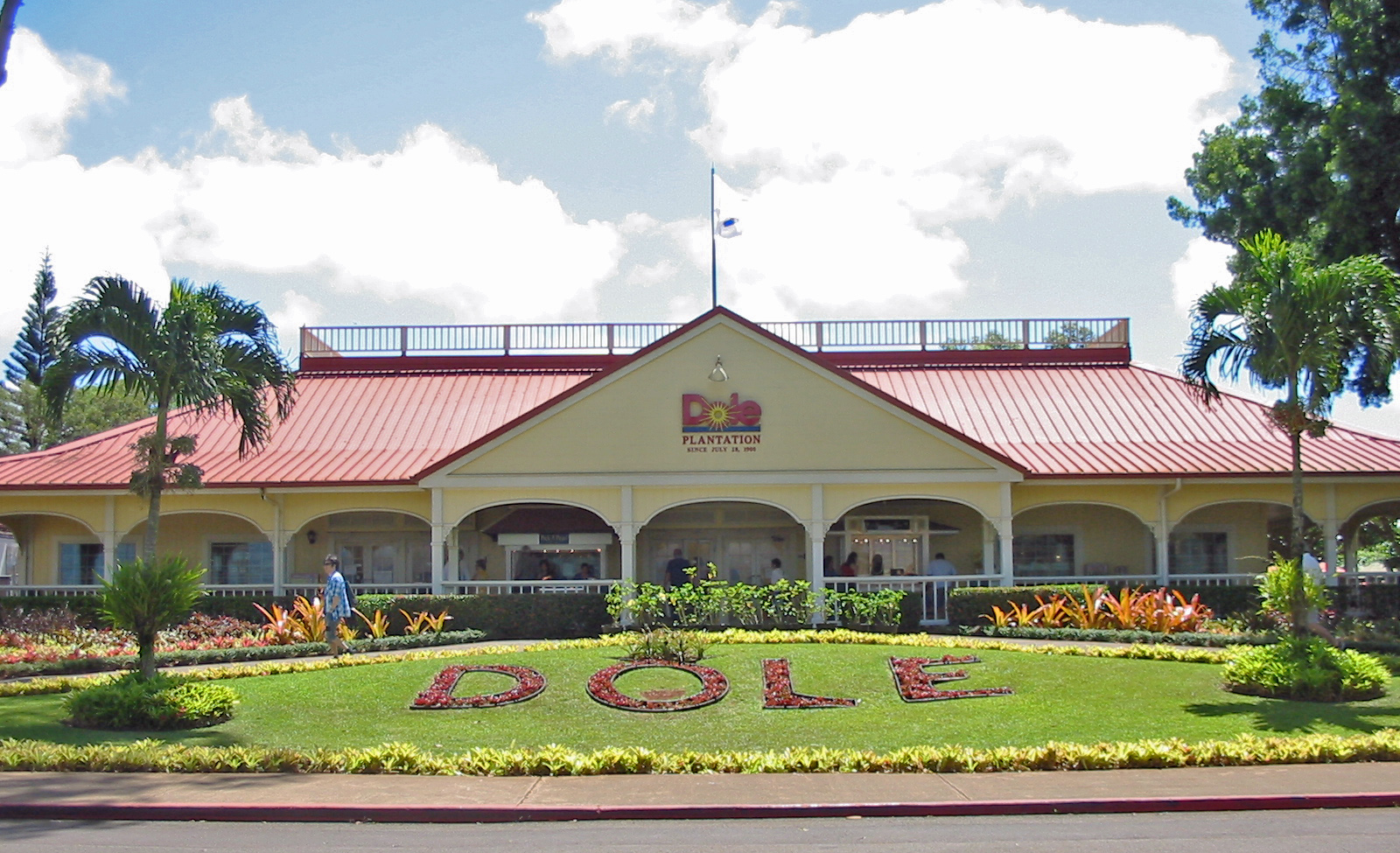
Dole Food Company was founded in 1851 in Wahiawā.

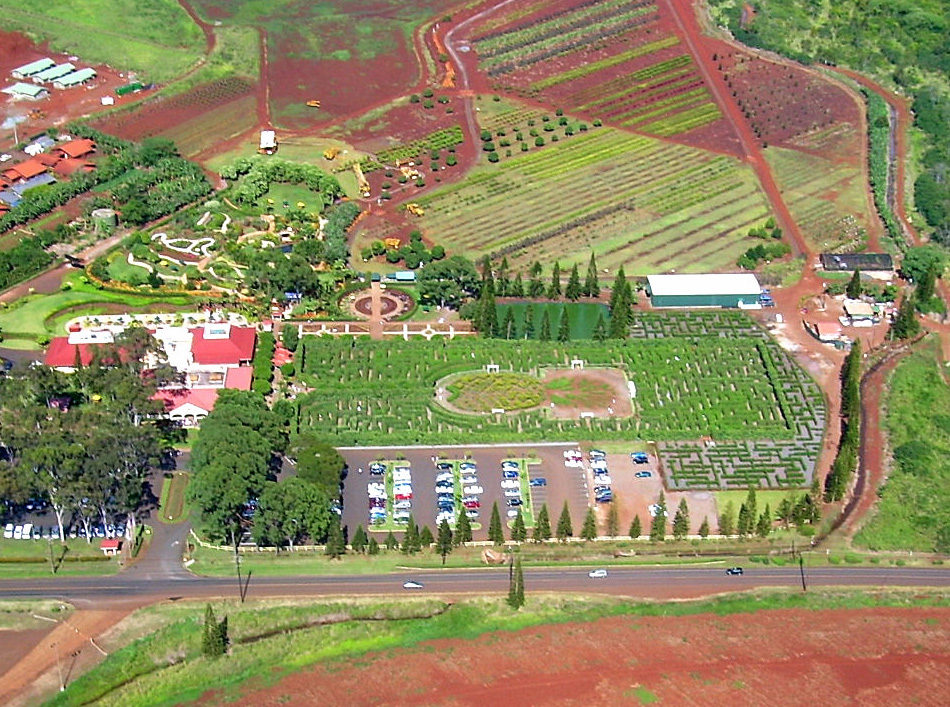
Dole's Plantation Garden Maze recaptured the world record of world's largest maze in 2008, occupying 137,194 square feet. The maze topped the record in 2001 of the Peace Maze in Northern Ireland, which currently measures in at 118,403.

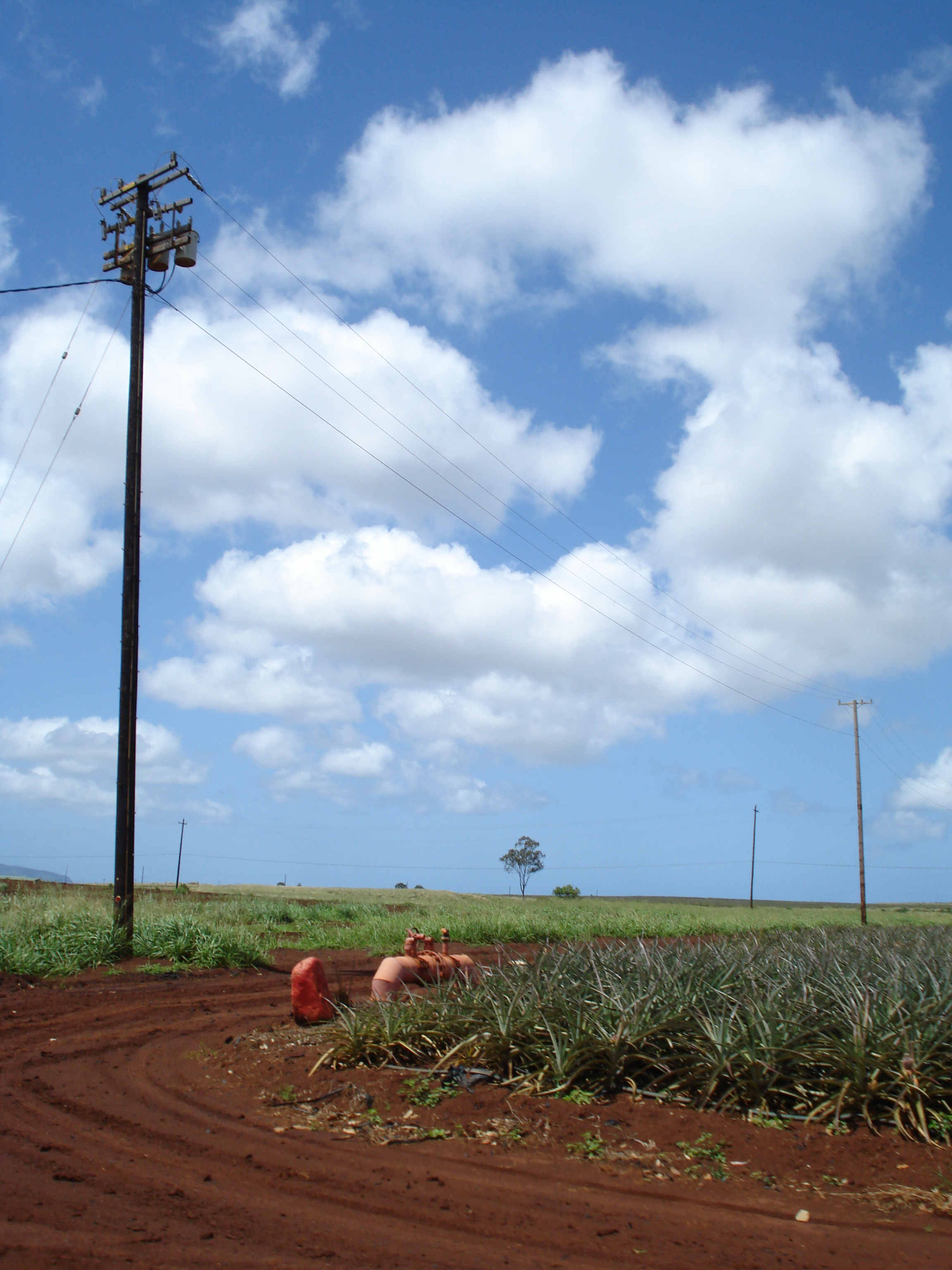
Pineapple plantation field in Wahiawā is where the Dole pineapple industry started.

Wahiawā is the home of 25th I.D. Tropic Lightning since 1941. Currently basing more than 15,000 soldiers in Schofield Barracks and growing.

Navy satellite antennas in Wahiawā

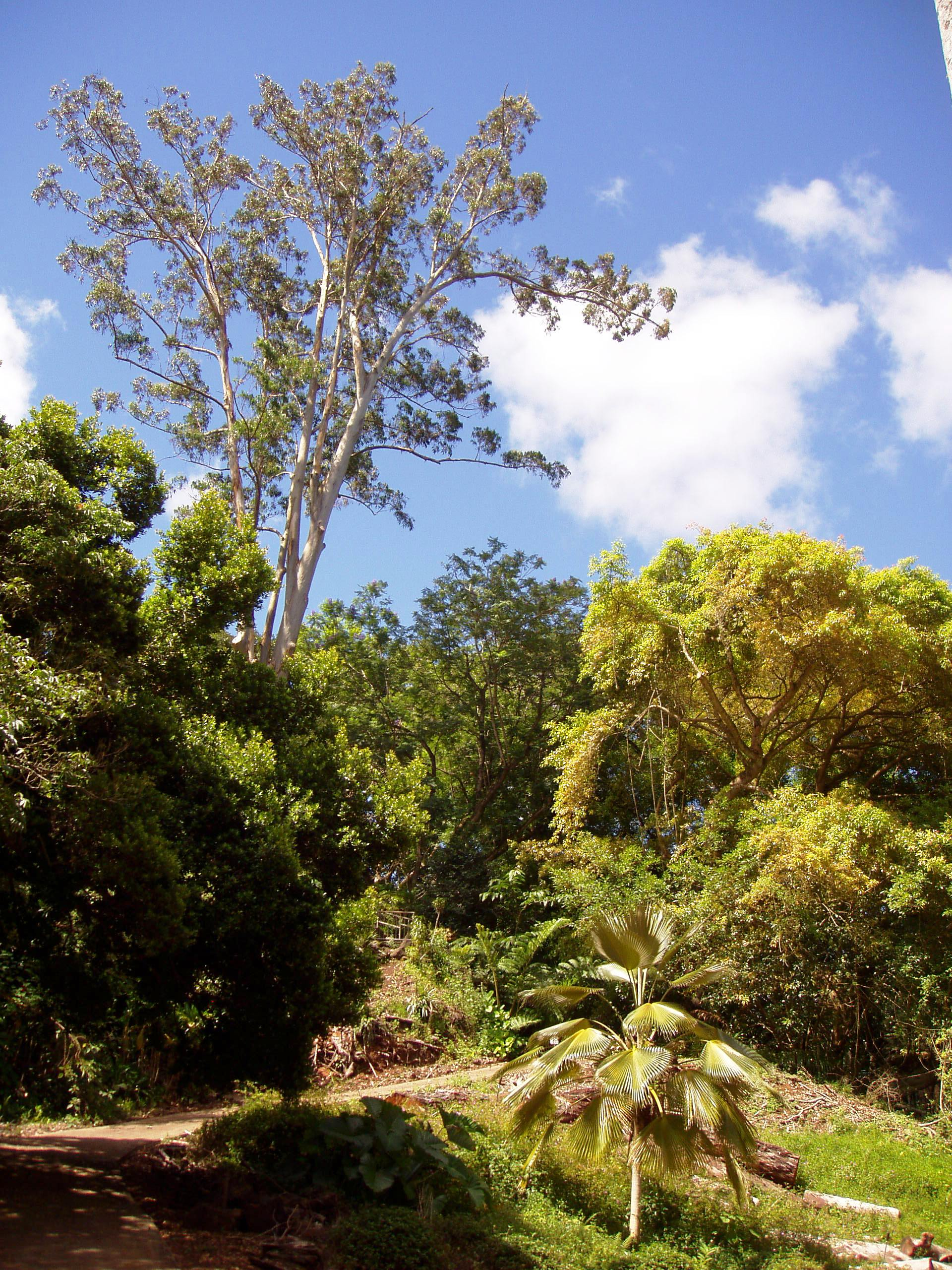
Wahiawā Botanical Garden, one of the tourist spots in Wahiawā

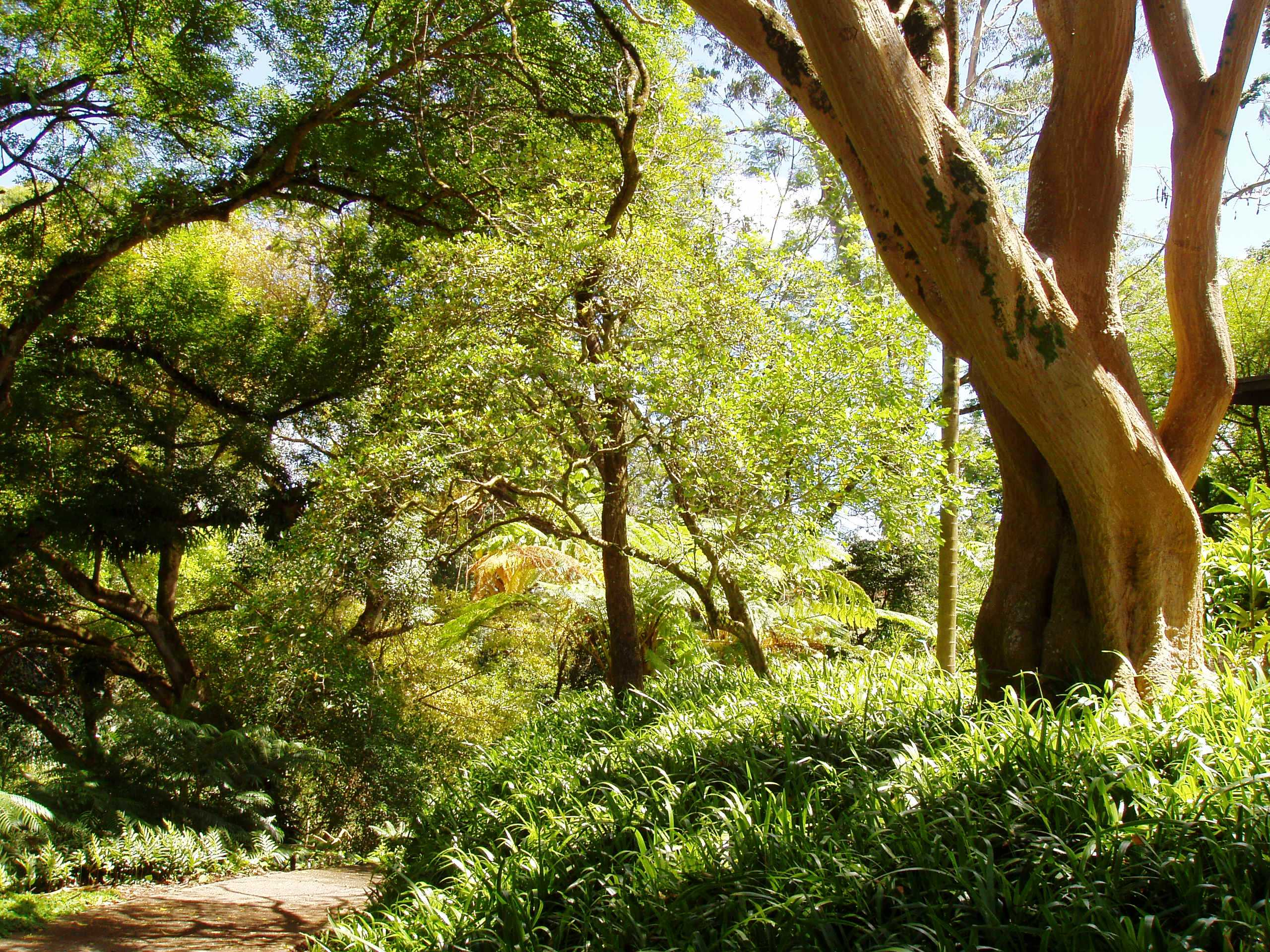
Wahiawā Botanical Garden
