= Ik-Joong Kang =

Korean-American artist (born 1960)

- Hangul: 강익중
- Hanja: 姜益中
- RR: Gang Ikjung
- MR: Kang Ikchung

Ik-Joong Kang (Korean: 강익중; born 11 September 1960), is a Korean American visual artist, best known for his work using canvases measuring 3 by 3 inches (7.6 cm × 7.6 cm). Well-acknowledged in his native South Korea as well as his adopted home, the US, Kang had multiple exhibitions hosted by major institutions in both countries, such as the Whitney Museum of American Art at Champion, Connecticut (1994), the Whitney Museum of American Art at Philip Morris, New York (1996), and the National Museum of Modern and Contemporary Art, Korea (2010). Kang had been one of the two artists commissioned to represent South Korea for the 47th Venice Biennale in 1997 and was awarded an honorable mention.

== Early life and education ==
Kang was born in Cheongwon-gun, a region now part of the city of Cheongju in North Chungcheong Province, South Korea, but grew up in Itaewon, a district in Seoul popular among ex-pats and U.S. military personnel for being closely located by the Yongsan Garrison of the United States Forces Korea (USFK). Kang had pursued art since a young age, having been encouraged by his family, known as descendants of many artists and scholars, such as Kang Sehwang (1713–1791), an influential literati painter of Joseon (1392–1910).

Kang's interest in art continued through high school, leading him to study painting at Hong-Ik University in Seoul and earn his BFA degree in 1984. Unsatisfied by his studies, Kang moved to New York to further study at Pratt Institute and earned his MFA in 1988. Kang has since lived and worked between Chelsea and Chinatown in Manhattan, New York City.

== Works and career ==
=== 3 × 3-inch canvases ===
While a student at Pratt Institute, Kang had worked twelve hours a day between a grocery store in Manhattan and a flea market in Far Rockaway, Queens. The three-hour commute of subway riding and walking evolved into his time and place to make art, as Kang figured 3-square-inched sized canvases easily fit into his pocket as well as the palm of his hand. On such canvases, Kang painted, drew, wrote, sewed, and attached clay, metal, rice, and plastic, among other found objects collected amongst the city's discarded materials, developing a multimedia practice. The resulting thousands "artistic painting/objects", described as both "immediate and diaristic" of the artist's life in a new city and culture, would be hung into a grid formation. Kang stated that his adoption of the grid formation has come from observing the tiled walls of New York City's subway platforms, which alluded to a strong sense of space and time, and also referred to the structure of Japanese Shoji as another source of inspiration, for it contains several small squares within a larger one, offering a person both a limited and vast amount of space. Curator Eugenie Tsai found Kang's grid formation "diametrically opposed to" European History paintings that encapsulated single moments and subverted the modernist grid by presenting the artist's "experience of the undifferentiated commonplace". While the large-scale mosaic-like installations, often presented as public art, persisted as the artist's dominant style, Kang also developed his oeuvre by transforming his daily practice of making the canvases into "living" performances for which he would make paintings continuously for the duration of a show (One Month Living Performance, Two Two Raw Gallery, New York, NY, 1986), incorporating elements of sound (SSOUND PAINTINGSS, Montclair State College, Montclair, NJ, 1990), or translating them into a series of woodcuts (1991).

=== Early works ===
After graduating from Pratt, Kang began working in his studio in Chinatown, among other artists of Asian descent. Frequenting together around Chinatown's affordable lunch spots was formed the Tuesday Lunch Club (TLC), including artists such as Arlan Huang, Bing Lee, Byron Kim, and Ken Chu. The casual social gatherings often involved discussions about the limited opportunities available for Asian American artists, who found themselves historically excluded from the art world. Born from the Tuesday Lunch Club meetings thus hatched the pan-Asian and Pacific Islander American artists' collective, Godzilla Asian American Arts Network, led by Lee, Chu, and Margo Machida in 1990. While Kang was not part of the founding members of Godzilla, he maintained close ties with many deeply involved.

Kang had been exposed to and engaged with projects of the time that responded to racial inequalities nonetheless and participated in a number of shows curated by Asian American curators and art organizations, such as the Asian American Arts Centre. In 1990, Kang was among those coordinating the exhibition The Mosaic of the City: Artists Against Racial Prejudice held at the Skylight Gallery of the Center for Arts and Culture of Bedford Stuyvesant in Brooklyn. The Mosaic of the City was organized by Artists Against Racial Prejudice (AARP), "a multi-ethnic group [of artists] that formed in reaction to the racial tension that has recently exploded in Brooklyn," signaling to the time's intraracial conflict between Korean American and African American communities that surfaced with the Family Red Apple boycott. Through the exhibition, the artists aimed to "create an open forum where issues of racial prejudice can be addressed". Among the seventy-five participating artists, mostly of Asian or African descent, were Korean American artists Ik-Joong Kang, Mo Bahc, Sung Ho Choi, Taeho Lee, Yeong Gill Kim, Kwangsung Lee, Oh Chi-Gyun, Hoyoon Choi, and William Jung.

The works produced during the early years of his career grafted aspects of and his experiences between Korean and American culture. Kang's untitled series of drawings from 1992, on 3 × 3-inch pieces of paper, put alongside English words and phrases written in red and their Korean translations in blue. Buddha Learning English (1992–1994) was a series that followed, which paired seated Buddha images, a repeated motif found in Kang's oeuvre, with a recording of the artist reciting English phrases sampled from magazines, newspapers, and books. Chocolate also surfaced as a significant material incorporated into the artist's work, as exemplified in 8490 Days of Memory (1996), as a scarce and luxurious treat G.I.s gave out to children in post-war Korea that signaled America's plenitude.

=== Nam June Paik ===
The Korean-American video artist Nam June Paik has been cited as an influential and significant figure to Kang, especially for their shared approach and system to art-making: employing modular units to build up a larger whole, which both artists likened to bibimbap, a Korean dish that mixes rice with whatever is at hand. Kang and Paik have been paired up multiple times for a two-person exhibition. The earliest exhibition was curated by Eugenie Tsai, titled Multiple/Dialogue: Nam June Paik & Ik-Joong Kang, for the Whitney Museum of American Art at Champion in 1994. Tsai's exhibition at the Whitney was expanded upon by the National Museum of Modern and Contemporary Art, Korea, in 2009, commemorating Paik's passing in 2006. For the latter exhibition, titled Multiple/Dialogue ∞, Kang presented the work Samramansang ("all things in nature", 삼라만상, 2009), which presented approximately 62,000 of his 3 x 3 inch canvases installed around a 200-meter-long spiral wall. The work was to surround Paik's Dadaiksun ("more the better", 다다익선, 1988), a highlighted work of the National Museum of Modern and Contemporary Art's collection, which was commissioned to and built using 1,003 televisions by Paik to celebrate 1988 Summer Olympics held by Korea. The exhibition featured Kang's performance of making bibimbap to share with the audience.

=== Collecting drawings by children, 1997– ===
In 1997, the artist began collecting drawings from participants among the general public and especially children. Kang would incorporate the drawings into large-scale murals or outdoor installation works by transferring the images onto 3 × 3 or square tiles of varying sizes. The earliest example, 100,000 Dreams (1999–2000), displayed drawings from 50,000 South Korean children that were built into a 1-kilometer-long winding vinyl greenhouse. The project led Kang to work on similar public artworks, which incorporated drawings by children from a wide range of countries and cultures. 34,000 drawings by children from 135 countries were solicited for Amazed World (2001), a commission from the United Nations, and 126,000 drawings by children from 141 countries for Moon of Dream (2004), a commission by World Culture Open.

By 2004, Kang's approach to the series evolved to involve not only drawings but also objects. For the opening of the new building of Princeton Public Library, NJ, Kang assembled a mural titled Happy World (2004). Among its consisting 2,700 3 x 3-inch tiles were about 1,000 tiles that incorporated meaningful artifacts donated by the Princeton community, including "a deck of playing cards owned by Albert Einstein, pieces of the Berlin Wall, and a 1909 Free Public Library notice, along with everyday items such as a sports equipment, a parking meter, and family photos." 50,000 Windows, A Future Wall (2008) for Gyeonggi Museum of Modern Art is another large-scale mural that incorporates drawings by children, collected objects, as well as the artist's own drawings and writing on 3 x 3-inch tiles.

=== Ik-Joong Kang Typeface, 2001– ===
While Kang's own handwriting–both in Korean and English–had been incorporated from early in his career, in 2001, Kang began to put forth a series of works in which a single 3 x 3-inch canvas bore one syllable in hangul, the Korean alphabet. Each syllable was written and drawn with "crapas", a children-friendly type of crayon. Using its dozen colors, Kang distinguished between the syllable's consonant and vowel letters that highlighted hangul's modular system of construction. This design has become known as the Ik-Joong Kang Typeface (강익중체, kangikchungch'e). The artist further produced hangul letters that can better notate English pronunciations, such as the f, r, th, v, and z consonants. The many syllables and canvases put together made sentences in Korean, offering simple factoids and points of wisdom the artist claims to "know" or has learned from life. The series, titled Things I Know, developed from offering a single sentence to multiple, developing into and presented as prose poetry. The series was featured as a large-scale installation in the Korean Pavilion for Expo 2010 Shanghai China and also developed as a participatory work that incorporated sentences received from the general public for the artist's solo show at Arko Art Center, Seoul, in 2017.

=== Moon Jar, 2006– ===
The moon jar (달항아리, dalhangari), an iconic type of Korean white porcelain named after its full moon shape, emerged as a major subject and motif in the artist's oeuvre beginning in 2007. The artist was first reminded of the moon jar by chance when his work Moon of the Dream (2004), a 15-meter-diameter spherical balloon made of 126,000 children's drawings, had unintentionally deflated to an irregular shape during its installation before floating on a lake near the demilitarized zone between North and South Korea. Paying attention to the fact that moon jars were produced by a particular process of adjoining two hemispherical halves, the artist likened the porcelain ware to hangul–both invented during Joseon–as well as the current state of the Korean peninsula, for they all required combining and unification.

The series of works developed into mixed media paintings, sculptural installations, such as 1392 Moon Jars (Wind) (2008–10) belonging to the Guggenheim Collection, and large public installations. For example, Mountain and Wind (2007) was a major city project commissioned by South Korea's Cultural Heritage Administration, which served as a facade during the restoration of the Gwanghwamun. The facade consisted of 2,611 wooden panels painted with images of the moon jar and Inwangsan, the mountain behind Gwanghwamun and Gyeongbokgung Palace, as well as 5,200 drawings by children from around the globe. In 2020, the 70th anniversary of the Korean War, Kang was commissioned with another public artwork to be installed in Gwanghwamun Plaza by the Ministry of Patriots and Veterans Affairs. Titled Gwanghwamun Arirang, the work in cube format was composed of 12,000 3 x 3-inch drawings by children from the 23 nations that supported South Korea during the Korean War, their silhouette shaped into a large moon jar. Surrounding the moon jar were the artist's hangul letter drawings spelling out the lyrics to the Korean folk song Arirang as well as the names of 175,801 fallen soldiers of the Korean War. Gwanghwamun Arirang was a kinetic sculpture, its top half in slow rotation.
