= Kim Kim Gallery =

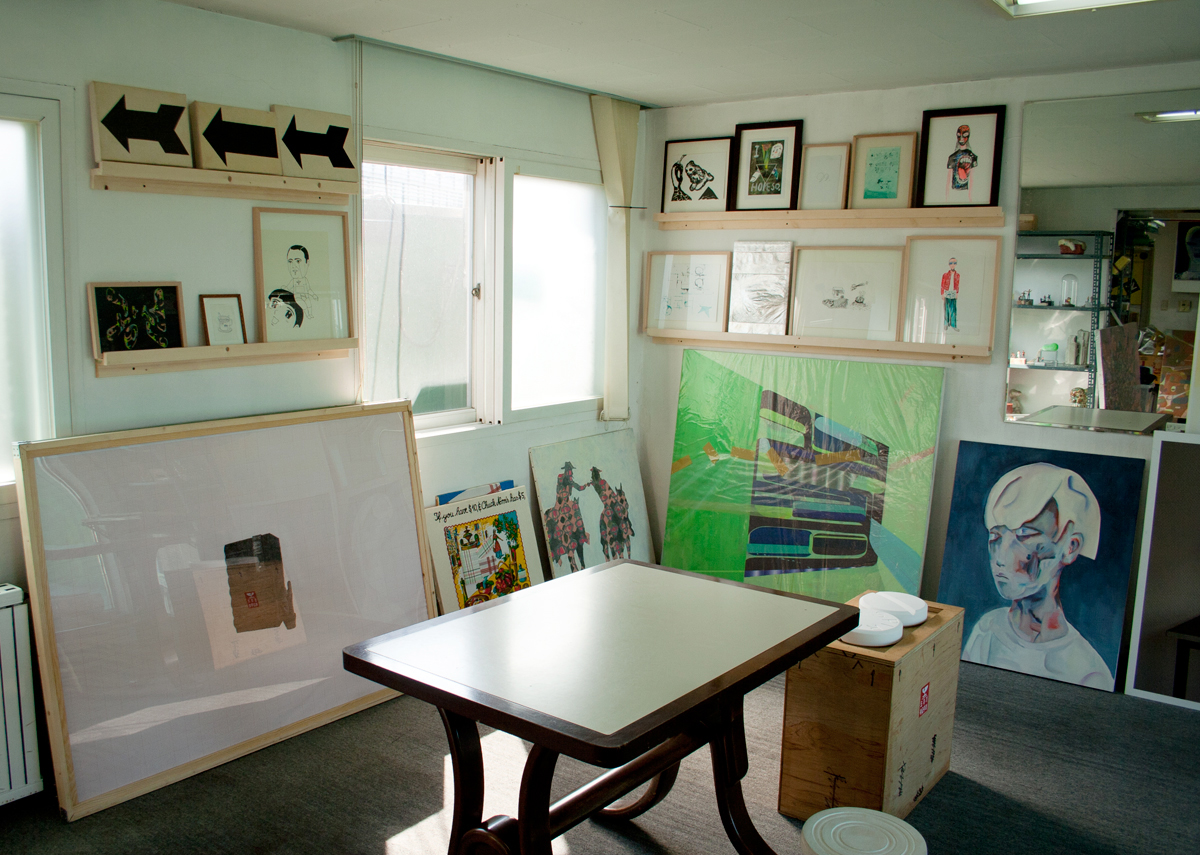
- Kim Kim Gallery opened their first showroom in 2011 near Garosu-gil in Seoul
- Founded: March 2008
- Founder: Gregory Maass & Nayoungim
- Purpose: Contemporary art
- Location: Seoul, South-Korea
- Origins: Market Gallery, Glasgow, Scotland
- Employees: 2
- Website: www.kimkimgallery.com

Kim Kim Gallery is a contemporary art gallery run by Gregory Maass & Nayoungim, a German-Korean artist duo. The Gallery was founded at the Market Gallery in Glasgow, Scotland, in 2008. It describes itself as "a non-profit organization, locative art, an art dealership based on unconventional marketing, a curatorial approach, an exhibition design firm, and editor of rare artist books, depending on the situation it adapts to; in short, it does not fit the format imposed by the term Gallery".Clemens Krümmel writes, "This begins with the excess of dis-identificatory self-reference in creative dialogue with the institution Kim Kim Gallery, along with corporate identity and advertising products and a mania borrowed from Martin Kippenberger for 'great' work or exhibition titles".

KKG has gained international recognition through their projects, including, among others: Douglasism at the international Art Fair, Art:Gwangju:12 in Korea the solo exhibition "Apple vs. Banana" of Chung Seo-young, voted one of the best shows in 2011 by the Art in Culture Magazine; and "More of the Best of Firmin Graf Salawàr dej Striës" by Jeff Gabel, exhibiting new large scale site-specific drawings on canvas rendered in pencil. KKG contributed as exhibition designer to the Daegu Photo Biennial special exhibition in 2012.

"Douglasism", a festival which took place in Seoul in October–November 2013, centered on the works of British artist Douglas Park , in collaboration with Komplot Brussels, Trinity ∴ and FLACC.

== Exhibited artists ==
- Klaus Weber
- Sophie von Hellermann
- Geert Goiris
- Stefan Ettlinger
- Jeff Gabel
- Douglas Park
- Chung Seoyoung
- Nakhee Sung
- Nakyoung Sung
- Robert Estermann
- Nicolai Seyfarth
- Ingo Baumgarten

== Interviews ==
- Video interview with Gregory Maass & Nayoungim in their show "The Early Worm",
- "Octavianus", a video interview with Gregory Maass and Yiso Bahc.
- "Pièce Unique", an Interview with Gregory Maass about the art of Robert Estermann.
- "Diarrhea-Causes, Symptoms & Treatment", an Interview/Manifesto with Gregory Maass & Nayoungim on occasion of the exhibition "Paranoia Paradise"
- Douglas Park, "Douglasism Interview", an Interview with Yang Ji-yoon at the Corner Art Space in Seoul Audio File of Interview at Corner Station.
- Douglas Park: 24 Hour Non-Stop Interview "Post-Terminal & Ex-Ultimate", Dougals Park with Monika. K. Adler, Cel Crabeels, Richard Crow, Oriana Dierinck, Tony Gross, Alex Hamilton, Melissa Moore, Puss & Mew, Pete Um and Keef Winter.
