= Na-young =

- Hangul: 나영
- RR: Nayeong
- MR: Nayŏng
- IPA: [na.jʌŋ]

Na-young, also spelled Na-yeong, is a Korean given name.

People with this name include:

== Film and television ==
- Nam Na-yeong (born 1971), South Korean film editor
- Lee Na-young (born 1979), South Korean actress
- Kim Na-young (television personality) (born 1981), South Korean television personality
- Seo Seung-ah (born Lee Na-young, 1983), South Korean actress

== Musicians ==
- Na-Young Jeon (born 1989), Dutch-South Korean actress and singer
- Kim Na-young (singer) (born 1991), South Korean singer and actress
- Lim Na-young (born 1995), South Korean singer and actress, former member of girl groups I.O.I and Pristin

== Sportspeople ==
- Kim Na-young (judoka) (born 1988), South Korean judoka
- Kim Na-young (figure skater) (born 1990), South Korean figure skater

== Others ==
- Kim Nayoung (born 1966), South Korean artist, member of the collaborative art duo Gregory Maass & Nayoungim
- Kim Na-young (born c. 2000), alias of the victim in the 2008 Cho Doo-soon case

== See also ==
- List of Korean given names
