= Bahc Yiso =

South Korean artist (1957–2004)

- Hangul: 박이소
- Hanja: 朴異素
- RR: Bak Iso
- MR: Pak Iso

Bahc Yiso (Korean: 박이소; Hanja: 朴異素, 23 June 1957 – 26 April 2004), also known as Mo Bahc, was a South Korean visual artist, cultural organizer, curator, theorist, and educator.

He went by three first names during his lifetime; while Cheol-ho (철호; 哲熇) was his legal name, he adopted the name Mo (모; 某) during his time in New York, which he changed to Yiso (이소; 異素) when he returned to South Korea. Both of the adopted names indicate his self-identification of being displaced or on the periphery, which he had hoped to be a position of privilege "with more freedom to do something unexpected."

In New York, he was noted as the founder and director of Minor Injury, an alternative space in Greenpoint, Brooklyn, and a co-founder of SEORO Korean Cultural Network, a Korean American artists' network that bridged Korean American artists of various immigration backgrounds. His works produced in New York reflect his engagement with the time's political and cultural movement addressing the systemic marginalization of minority groups and questioning issues surrounding race and identity.

His time in Korea is said to have been a prolific period for Bahc as an artist, producing works beyond the realm of identity politics. Bahc's interested in reforming Korea's art education system also led him to lecture drawing at SADI, among other universities. Bahc has been credited as a critical figure in Korea's contemporary art scene, especially for introducing the American discourse of poststructuralism or critical postmodernism by his writing and translation work.

== Early life ==
Bahc was born in Busan as the youngest to a family of six children and given the name Cheol-ho (철호; 哲熇). Following the promotion of his father who worked for The Republic of Korea National Red Cross, the family moved from Busan to Seoul in 1967. Bahc's chronic health issues posed difficulties for him attending high school, especially participating in the military training that was compulsory at the time. After dropping out, Bahc took and passed the Korean High School Graduation Equivalency Examination, known in Korean as geom-jeong-go-shi (검정고시).

== Education ==
Bahc studied painting at Hongik University, graduating in 1981, the year following the Gwangju Uprising. In 1982, Bahc moved to New York City to further pursue his studies at Pratt Institute, where he earns an MFA degree in May 1985.

== Career ==
=== In New York City: 1982–1994 ===
One of his first notable works, Mo Bahc's Fast After Thanksgiving Day (1984) was performed after attending a Thanksgiving dinner, fasting for three days, and crossing the Brooklyn Bridge into Manhattan, as he dragged behind him a plastic-molded rice pot by a rope tied around his neck. At the time of the performance, Bahc takes the name "Mo (모; 某)," a Korean term used to address a person when their first name is unknown or undisclosed.

==== Minor Injury ====
Upon graduating from Pratt Institute, Bahc moves to Greenpoint, Brooklyn, as did many young artists who were attracted to the area for its cheap rent prior to the area's gentrification. There he renovates what was previously a warehouse into studio spaces with fellow Korean artists and Pratt Institute alumni Sung Ho Choi and Il Lee. It is also in Greenpoint where he co-founds the alternative art space Minor Injury in 1985, running it with co-founder Sam Binkley and later co-director Dave Hornor until the end of 1989. His interest in alternative exhibition spaces had stemmed from the experience of interning at the Artist Space during his last semester at Pratt Institute and reading articles written by Robert Longo, artist and co-founder of Hallwalls.

Bahc saw many of the alternative spaces of the time to have assimilated into the capitalist system by "[functioning] just as nurseries for the commercial dealers," pointing out that many were celebrating their accomplishments by naming artists who have since become respected by the major art scene. His aims for Minor Injury were to find ways to resist the capitalist art world. Located at 1073 Manhattan Ave, Minor Injury sought out its audience amongst Greenpoint's residents, who were predominantly Polish immigrants, and operated by volunteers to minimize its dependency on outside funding. Its mission statement also specified its goals to work with artists who were "racial, cultural, political and social minorities, or whose work reflects a related concern" or "recent immigrants from troubled or developing countries." These criteria were not set to simply promote artists of specific identities but to present the minor, social, political, and personal voices that were marginalized or excluded from the mainstream. As an attempt to reject the commercial tendency of treating artists as potential celebrities and instead believing they should to be treated as "common people or the residents next door," Bahc himself curated shows at Minor Injury, such as Ego Show (Self Portrait by Anybody) (1985) and The Super Ego Show: A Landmark in the Evolution of Mankind (1987), that eliminated the traditional selection process and allowed exhibiting the works of those without professional art education, including children. News about Minor Injury as well as shows and public events taking place in the Northern Brooklyn area was shared through its newsletter, Word of Mouth: An Events Calendar from the Association of Williamsburgh/Greenpoint Artists and Minor Injury.

Minor Injury also hosted a number of shows by independent curators and artists, notably Homeland: A Palestine Quest (April 30–May 21, 1989), organized by artists Yong Soon Min and Shirin Neshat, and Min Joong Art: New Movement of Political Art from Korea (March 14–April 12, 1987), curated by independent curator Hyuk Um and artist Boc Su Jung. The latter is recognized as the first occasion a US audience was introduced to Minjung Art, after its initial showing at A Space in Toronto in January of the same year. Bahc assisted Hyuk Um and art critic Wan Kyung Sung curating Min Joong Art: A New Cultural Moment from Korea (September 29–November 5, 1988) at the Artists Space, further garnering attention to the Korean art movement.

==== SEORO Korean Cultural Network ====
Following the closure of Minor Injury, Bahc's interests in Korean art led to the founding of SEORO Korean Cultural Network (1990–1994) with his close associates, artist Sung Ho Choi and filmmaker Hye-jung Park. SEORO, meaning "each other" or "one another" in Korean, connected artists of Korean heritage who were either US-born or recent immigrants, whose numbers had sharply increased since the South Korean government relaxed its regulations on studying abroad by the late 1980s. Among the growing Korean artist's community in New York, Bahc, Sung Ho Choi, as well as Yong Soon Min were among those instrumental in organizing exhibitions, symposia, and programs that discussed what constituted as Korean American art or Korean art in the US. The 1988 symposium "Korean Art Today" held at the Asian American Arts Centre and Immigrant Show at the Alpine Gallery, as well as the 1989 round table discussion "A Conversation on the Reality of Korean Art in New York" hosted by a major Korean art magazine Monthly Art (Wolgan Misul, 월간미술) are some of the major precursory events involving Bahc that prompted the formation of SEORO. To facilitate communication and cross-cultural learning between Korean American artists of various immigration histories, SEORO ran a quarterly newsletter SEORO Bulletin, later named as SEORO SEORO. Bahc led SEORO's proposal of and participation in the exhibition Across the Pacific: Contemporary Korean and Korean American Art, which has been considered the most notable accomplishment made by the Korean Cultural Network. The exhibition, which was first presented at Queens Museum, New York (October 15, 1993 – January 9, 1994) then traveled to Kumho Museum of Art in Seoul, Korea (August 23–September 23, 1994), featured Korean artists involved in the Minjung Art movement alongside Korean American artists exploring identities shaped by immigration and American multiculturalism, aiming to project contemporaneous, multidimensional Korean identities and art.

==== Bahc's work and writing ====
While leading Minor Injury and SEORO, Bahc's curating and organizational work, Bahc's earlier works produced in New York show a strong tendency to address his Korean identity within the American society and, thus, directly respond to social issues arising from racial tensions. Speaking English (1990) and Exotic-Minority-Oriental (1990) are examples in which Bahc put together a kitsch take on Korean traditional calligraphy with Western vernacular images, teasing out underlying linguistic codes and sociopolitical power structures. By his later years in New York, Bahc no longer made use of explicit juxtapositions between the visual and linguistic vocabulary of Korea and the US. Rather, culturally charged meanings were deliberately made unapparent. In Three Star Show (1994) and Trinity (1994), neither of the two works' visual imagery nor their titles signify towards its painting materials: coffee, coke, and soy sauce. Homo Identropous (1994), rendering a figure sitting upon a divided table, has been considered his final point in addressing the continued yet futile search for one's identity. Nevertheless, all of such works attested to Bahc's exposure to postcolonial, feminist, and postmodern theories, as well as to the time's raging identity politics and multiculturalism during his time in New York. Bahc did not show his own work at Minor Injury but instead in shows organized by other alternative exhibition spaces, cultural organizations, and artist collectives. Many of those engaged in discussions on the social and cultural landscape of marginalized communities, such as Godzilla Asian American Arts Network. While Bahc willingly participated in such projects, he was nonetheless aware of the fact that they were the only opportunities available to him, an artist from the Third World.

While actively working in the US, Bahc kept engaged with the Korean contemporary art scene as well. Bahc was among the artists and art students who acted as overseas correspondents while studying abroad during the late 1980s and early 1990s, sending art-related news to outlets in Korea. Their contributions have been considered pivotal to the development of the Korean contemporary art scene, as Western art had only been introduced to Korea through Japanese or American sources that remained untranslated or mistranslated. Between 1989 and 1994, Bahc submitted exhibition reviews and articles to some of the major art magazines in Korea, such as Monthly Art (Wolgan Misul, 월간미술), Art World (Misul Segye, 미술세계) and Gana Art (가나아트). His twenty-odd articles largely discussed 1) American multiculturalism, artists of Korean heritage and other ethnic minority groups, 2) spotlighted artists in the American contemporary art scene, and 3) postmodernism in relation to Korea. Bahc's interest in writing as well as critical discourse can be traced back to 1987. Having set up a study group among his close Korean associates, the members took turns in selecting, translating, and discussing texts, such as Fredrick Jameson's "Postmodernism and Consumer Society" (1983) and Allan Sekula's "Dismantling Modernism, Reinventing Documentary" (1976).

=== In Seoul: 1994–2004 ===
Bahc was invited to teach at the newly opening Samsung Art and Design Institute (SADI), while he and curator Young-Chul Lee had been preparing a residency program in New York for Korean artists. Following the project's dissolution, which had been named the New York Inter Art Program, Bahc returned to Seoul, Korea in 1994. Bahc adopted the name "Yiso (이소; 異素)," meaning unfamiliar and plain, and began using it as his artist name officially by 1998.

Bahc's interests in writing and translating art criticism persisted during his time in Korea. Between 1995 and 1996, Bahc attempted to establish a periodical with the planned title of Eyes and Culture (Nun'gwa Munhwa, 눈과 문화) with aims to expand the concept of the cultural arts, promote accurate writing and creative reading, emphasize the necessity for humanities-based interdisciplinary study, foster intellectual engagement with the quickly-developing visual and popular culture, and offer a platform at an international level for information and intellectual exchange. Notably, the periodical was to have in place a theme for an issue at least 6 months in advance of its publication, and its contributors, generously compensated, were responsible to complete and deliver their manuscripts at least 3 months prior to the publishing date. Each issue, whose theme and content were not to be intervened by the publisher or sponsoring organization, allotted an equal amount of pages between contemporary arts and visual culture. An English issue was also to be printed every year. Although the publication ended up unrealized due to funding difficulties, it has been noted for its progressive format, content, and editorial direction.

Bahc's translation work, on the other hand, was successful in terms of publication and circulation within Korea. His translations of John Storey's 1993 book Cultural Theory and Popular Culture: An Introduction was published in 1994, the very same year he returned to Korea, and of Mary Anne Staniszewski's 1995 book Believing Is Seeing: Creating the Culture of Art in 1997. Both of the translated titles, which had each been written as a primer for cultural studies and for general interest, became widely read and taught at Korean universities, overlapping with Bahc's significant interest in teaching.

Believing in the need for an alternative model of art education to help advance Korean art, Bahc contributed much to the formation of SADI's education system, curriculum, as well as teaching methods that largely sought after and tailored those of the partnered Parsons School of Design. Bahc's first course, taught in early 1995, was titled "Drawing Concepts," in which students explored drawing as an artistic method for visually rendering and conveying ideas. The course introduced the practice of keeping daybooks, also a core concept at Parsons, which trained students to visualize their thoughts by habitual sketching and writing. Bahc's emphasis on drawing as part of the core curriculum at SADI was also to encourage its students to move away from their college prep training and instead learn to foster self-expression. Bahc later went on to teach similar versions of his drawing course at Korea National University of Arts and Kaywon University of Art and Design.

Such emphasis on drawing and note-taking was directly sourced from Bahc's own artistic practices. Bahc not only kept a vigorous note-taking habit since his time as a graduate student but also produced highly detailed and refined drawings. By the mid-1990s, around Bahc's relocation from New York to Seoul, his work shifted closer towards sculptural, installation pieces. For such works, making drawings during his working process helped distill the conceptual framework and gauge the final effect of his works in place of the exhibition's physical space. Often utilizing materials that were commonplace or easily found in construction or manufacturing sites, such as cement, wood, vinyl, and Styrofoam. Bahc's work produced in Korea was no longer immersed in American identity politics but retained a focus on institutionalized systems. For example, Sculpture for A4 (2000) and Untitled (one pyong) (2001) pointed out the gap between the work's given titles, which designated the work to be by a widely recognized measuring unit and the installed work's actual measurements. World's Top Ten Tallest Structures in 2010 (2003), and Venice Biennale (2003) rendered monumental buildings fragile and disreputable, destabilizing their signs of authority, achievements, and ambitions.

== Death ==
While teaching, translating, producing as well as exhibiting his works prolifically, Bahc died of a heart attack on 26 April 2004 at the age of 47.

== Exhibitions ==
Selected exhibitions curated by Bahc at Minor Injury:

- Ego Show (Self Portrait by Anybody), November 20–December 22, 1985
- Not Simple: the Human Emotional Complex, April 19–May 4, 1986
- The Super Ego Show: A Landmark in the Evolution of Mankind, January 10–February 1, 1987
- Trans Ego Show, November 12–December 11, 1988

Selected group exhibitions:

- Roots to Reality: Asian America in Transition, October 11–November 24, 1985, Henry Street Settlement with the Alliance for Asian American Arts and Culture
- Selections, September 18–October 18, 1986, Artists Space, NY
- A Decade of the Marketplace, 1990, Bronx Museum of the Arts, NY
- Public Art in Chinatown, May 20–June 21, extended to July 1988, Asian American Arts Centre, NY
- Immigrant Show, October 19–November 10, 1988, Alpine Gallery, NY
- Project DMZ, November 1988, Storefront for Art and Architecture, NY
- CHINA June 4, 1989, Asian American Arts Centre, NY
- The Mosaic of the City, 1990, the Center for Art and Culture of Bedford Stuyvesant, NY
- CommuNYCations: Public Mirror: Artists Against Racial Prejudice, September 13–October 7, 1990, Clocktower, NY
- And He Was Looking for Asia: Alternatives to the Story of Christopher Columbus Today, 1992, Asian American Arts Centre, NY
- 5th Havana Biennial, 1994, Havana, Cuba
- Beyond the Borders, February 18–June 12, 1994, Bronx Museum of the Arts, NY
- 2nd Gwangju Biennale, Unmapping the Earth, 1997, Gwangju, Korea
- 4th Taipei Biennale, Site of Desire, June 13–September 6, 1998, Taipei, Taiwan
- 1st Yokohama Triennale, 2001, Yokohama, Japan
- 50th Venice Biennale, Korean Pavilion, Landscape of Differences, 2003, Venice, Italy
- Your Bright Future: 12 Contemporary Artists from Korea, 2009, Los Angeles County Museum of Art, CA
  Painting and Writing, Hanlim Museum, Dai-jeon. 1998 Defrost, Sunjae Museum of Art, Kyongju.

Solo exhibitions

- Speak America, 1990, Bronx Museum, New York
- Bahc Mo, 1995, Kumho Museum of Art; Gallery Samtuh, Seoul, Korea
- Artists in Forties: Bahc Yiso, December 22, 2001 – January 7, 2002, Alternative Space Pool, Seoul, Korea
- Bahc Yiso, 2002, Gallery Hyundai, Seoul, Korea
- Fallayavada: Bahc Yiso Project and Tribute, October 27–November 23, 2005, the University Art Gallery of University of California, Irvine. Curated by Yong Soon Min, realizing a mixed media installation work he detailed in his notes prior to his death.
- Divine Comedy: A Retrospective of Bahc Yiso, March 10–May 14, 2006, the Rodin Gallery, Seoul, Korea.
- Yiso Bahc: Lines of Flight, August 20–October 23, 2011, Artsonje Center, Seoul, Korea. Co-curated by Sunjung Kim and Jung Un Kim.
- Yiso Bahc: Something for Nothing, April 19–June 1, 2014, Artsonje Center, Seoul, Korea
- Bahc Yiso: Memos and Memories, July 26–December 16, 2018, National Museum of Modern and Contemporary Art (MMCA), Korea, Gwacheon, Gyeonggi Province, Korea

== Selected works ==
- Mo Bahc's Fast After Thanksgiving Day (1984)
- Untitled (1986)
- Capital=Creativity (1986/1990)
- Weed (1988)
- Speaking English (1990)
- Exotic-Minority-Oriental (1990)
- Three Star Show (1994)
- Homo Identropus (1994)
- UN Tower (1997)
- Big Dipper in Eight Stars (1997–1999)
- Untitled (One Pyong) (2001)
- Your Bright Future (2002)
- World's Top Ten Tallest Structures in 2010 (2003)
- Wide World Wide (2003)
- We Are Happy (2004)

== Awards ==
- Korean Honors Scholarship, Korean Embassy, Washington D.C., 1983
- Fellowship in Painting, New York Foundation of the Arts, NY, 1989
- Yaddo Art Colony Residency, Saratoga Springs, NY, 1990
- Macdowell Art Colony Residency, Peterborough, NH, 1991
- Visual Artist Award in Painting, National Endowment for the Arts, 1991
- Artpace International Artist Residency Program and Exhibition, San Antonio, TX, 2000
- Hermes Korea Prize for Contemporary Art, Seoul, Korea, 2002
- Art Council Korea (ARKO), Korea, 2006
