= Gregory Maass & Nayoungim =

Artist twain

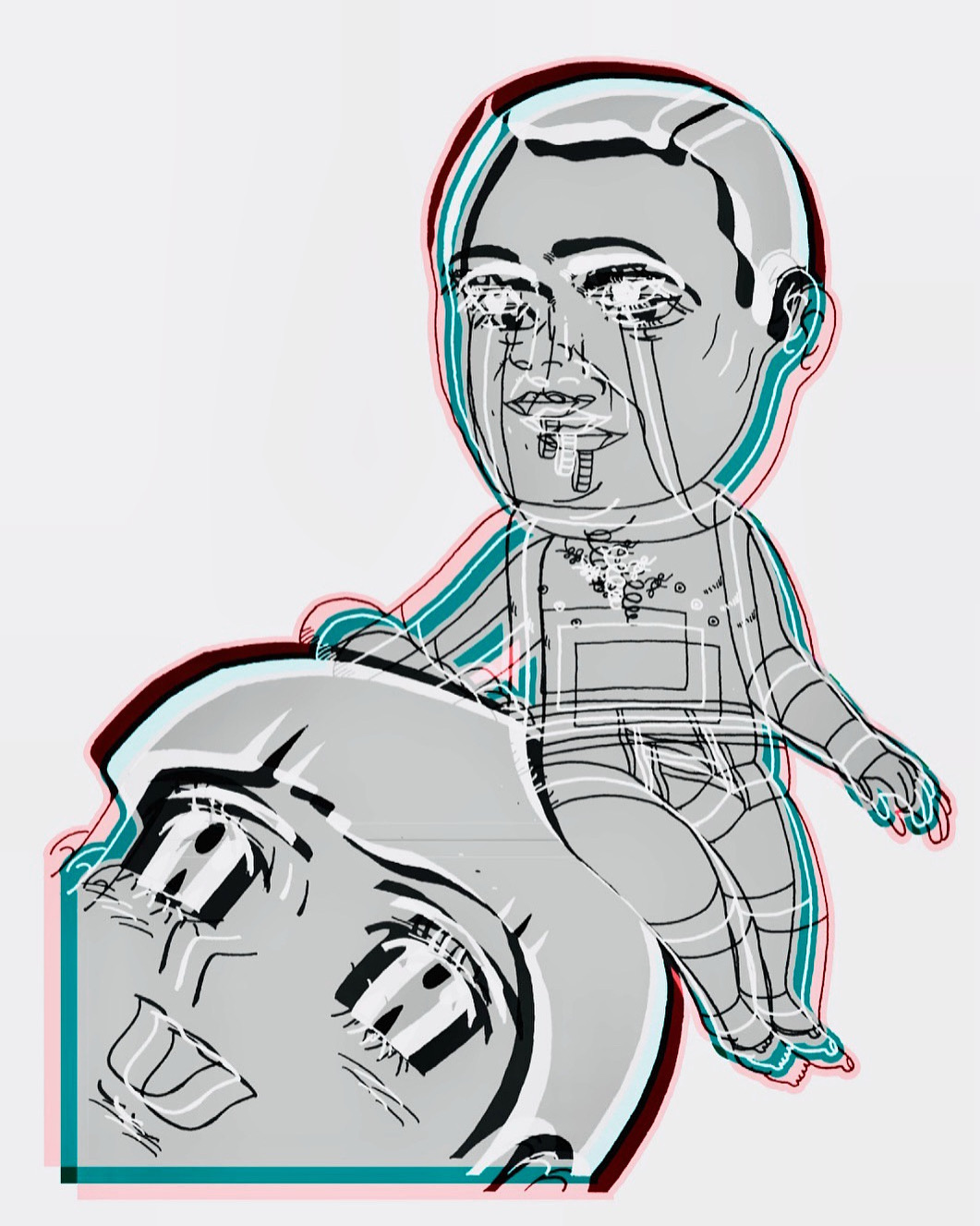
- Ink drawing revisited depicting Gregory Maass (top) and Nayoungim (bottom)
- Born: Gregory Stephan Maass (or Maaß) and Kim Nayoung; April 29, 1967 (age 59) Hagen, Germany (Gregory Maass) and March 13, 1966 (age 60) Seoul, South Korea (Nayoungim)

- 1 signature by Nayoungim middle right, 4 signatures by Gregory Maass.

Gregory Maass (born 29 April 1967 in Hagen, Germany) and Nayoungim (sometimes referred to as Kim Nayoung; Korean: 김나영; born 13 March 1966 in Seoul, South Korea) are two artists who work together as a twain called "Gregory Maass & Nayoungim". Gregory Maass & Nayoungim's avocations accrue philosophy, psychology, cybernetic management, economy, fringe science, Volatile Olfactory Compounds / perfumery, science fiction, the British art and craft movement, music, comics, conspiracy narrative, outsider art, sub-culture, and food; while focusing in their artwork on representational means like adaptation, normality, perversion xor paraphilia, and methodology. They christened at least 15 methods xor scheme of production: Frankensteining, Psychobuilding, , P-creativity, entraining painting, Interstitia, Equivalence, Uncanny V-effect, Phantuhsee, 2 cute alert, Splosching, WAM, Ex-situ, Cis-Art Thomaasson, and As-If. As-If, is a representational concept as if simulation is represented as real and if reality describes a simulation. They are the founders of Kim Kim Gallery, which describes itself as "a non-profit organization, locative art, an art dealership based on unconventional marketing, a curatorial approach, an exhibition design firm, and editor of rare art books, depending on the situation it adapts to; in short, it does not fit the format imposed by the term Gallery." Kim Kim Gallery is a system. The only purpose of a system is what it does, hitherto referring to the commonly observed phenomenon that the de facto purpose of a system is often at odds with its official purpose. A system is viable only by virtue of its sub-systems themselves being viable. One rarely appears in public without the other.

== Early lives ==
Gregory Maass was born in Hagen in North Rhine-Westphalia, northern Germany, his mother tongue being German. He worked as a paramedic before moving to Paris, France. He studied philosophy at the Paris-Sorbonne University aka Paris IV and art at the École nationale supérieure des Beaux-Arts, at the Institut des Hautes Études en Arts Plastiques (IHEAP) Paris (1993–94) and at Jan Van Eyck Academie the Netherlands (1998–2000).

Nayoungim was born in Seoul in South Korea. She studied art at the Seoul National University and later at the École nationale supérieure des Beaux-Arts. The two first met on 12 September 1991 while studying sculpture at the ENSBA. They communicate with each other in French, English, and Korean. They married in Hagen i.W. on December 30, 2008.

== Creativity ==
Gregory Maass & Nayoungim have the conviction that many people confuse intelligence and creativity. They further state that in reality mental illness tends to be a stronger indicator of exceptional creativity than intelligence is believed to be. Psychopathologies seem to herald extraordinary creativity rather than intelligence. Unusually creative individuals face fear, punishment, and social exclusion due to their ability to instigate change which is not always welcomed. There is a shared origin between mental disorder and very high creativity ; they are both perceived and felt in a similar manner by those who experience them first hand. There is also a commonality of suffering from more severe levels of depression and anxiety. Gregory Maass & Nayoungim are convinced that psychoticism is delineated when creativity affects how the world is perceived in a way that may not align with reality as somebody else perceives it. It has been deemed that highly creative people have a higher psychoticism index (P) than less-creative people. Not a mental ability but rather a cognitive style of overinclusiveness and a measure of absence of cognitive inhibition underlie (P)-creativity, leading to unusual thought patterns and impulsive behavior. The first stage of creation is where a large number of observations, information, thoughts, ideas, and even emotions appear from this chaos as order is created. The relationship between tremendous creative achievement and some aspects of mental illnesses is that people with these disorders perceive things in a different way. It's a kind of separation from reality and immersion of oneself in a world created within their own mind. They esteem this a path that somebody else might find unsettling, be leery of, and try to avoid at all cost.

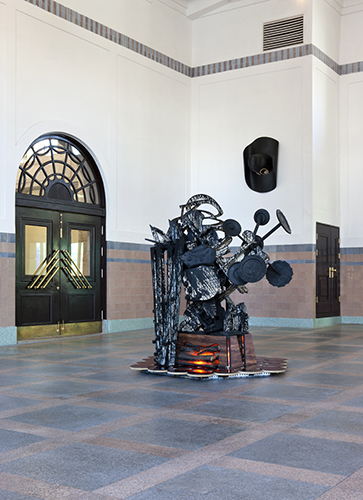
Psychotic Mickey Mouse, Seoul Culture Station, 2012

== Methods ==
One of Gregory Maass & Nayoungim's dominant methods of production they like to call Frankensteining. Frankensteining is an Anthimeria. Gregory Maass & Nayoungim collect objects and ideas eclectically, disassemble them and then reassemble them in a way that gives birth to unforeseen, and outré results. They christened at least 13 methods xor scheme of production: Frankensteining, Psychobuilding, Orificing, P-creativity, entraining painting, Interstitia, Equivalence, Uncanny V-effect, Phantuhsee, 2 cute alert, Splosching, WAM, Ex-situ, and Cis-Art Thomaasson. engendering collative properties, such as complexity, surprisingness, incongruity, ambiguity, and variability.

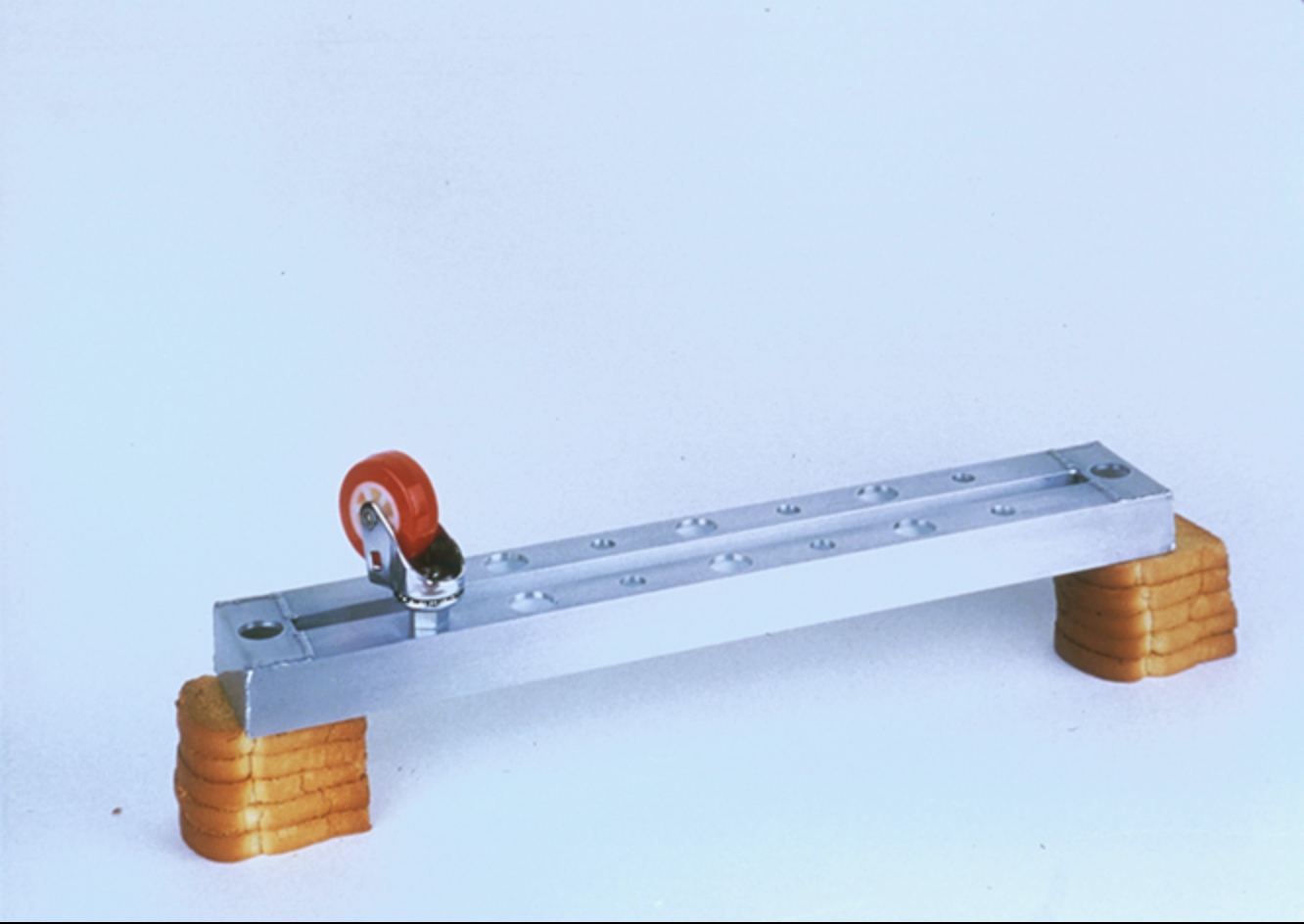
"French Toast Sculpture, 1994/5, Paris, France, 1st Frankensteining

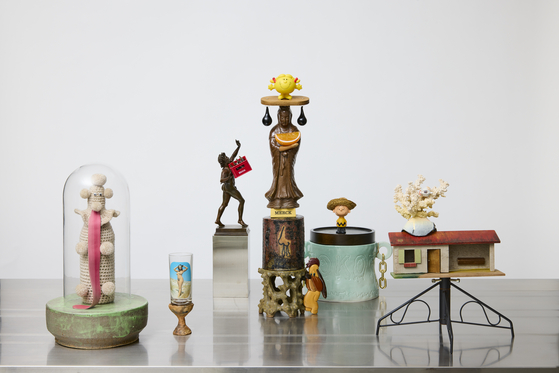
From left: "Size Matters," "Roman Gentleman's Goblet," "By Any Means Messassary (Dionysus)," "Amitabha Buddha," "Good Riddance (FOKOF)" and "Bikini Bottom".

== Works ==
Their work has addressed a wide variety of subject matters including scatology, survivalism, and economy. The two artists rarely appear in their own work.

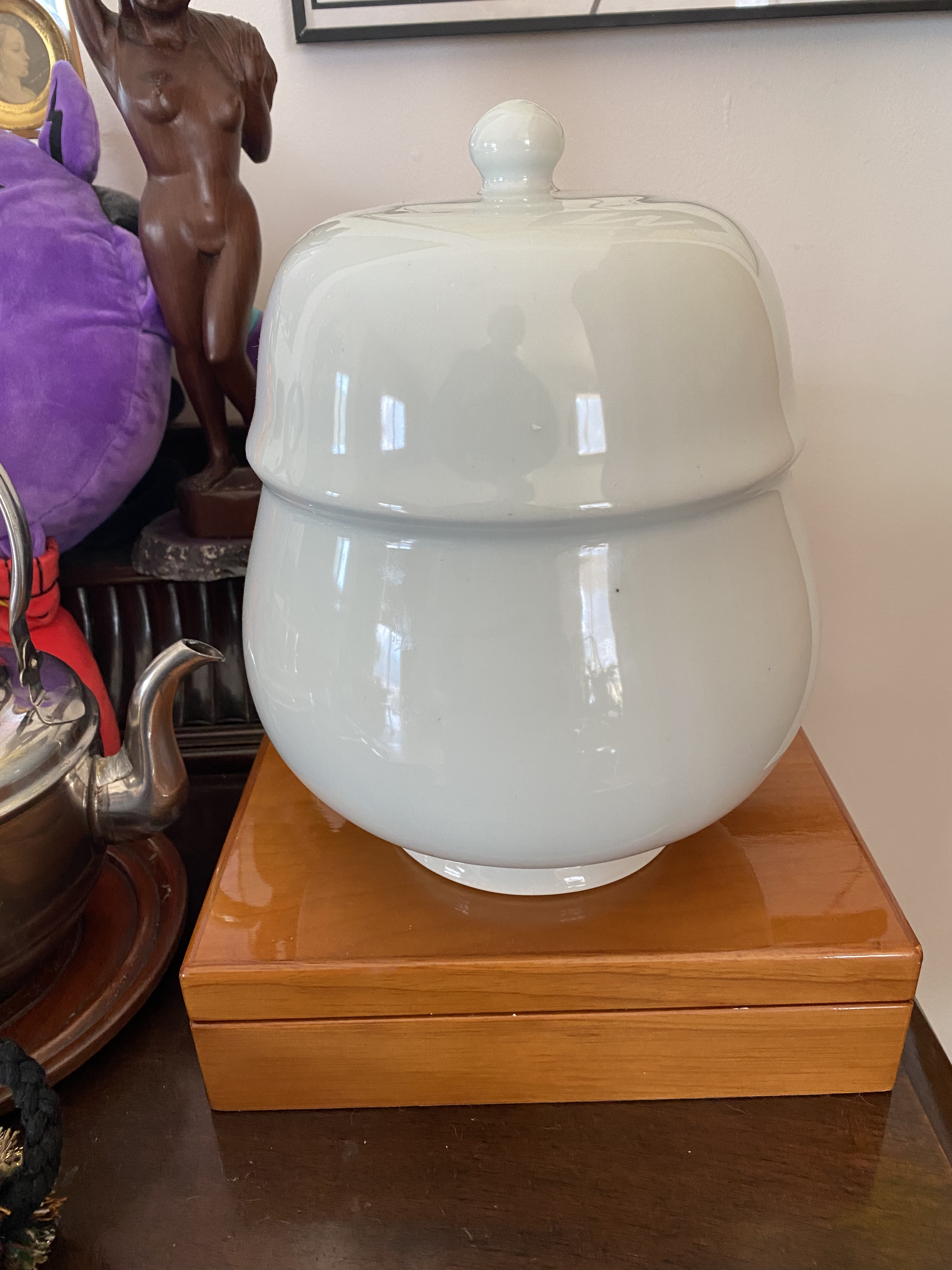
"As-If", 2026, by Gregory v Maass عطار & Nayoungim

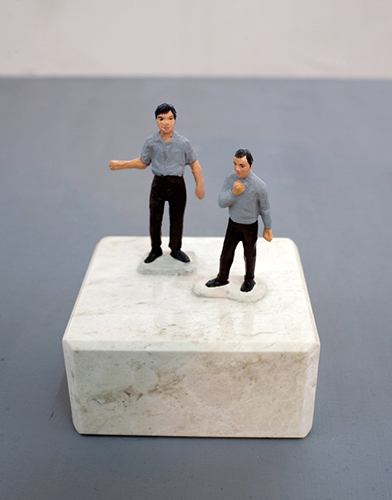
Mister, Relationships do not exist, 2010

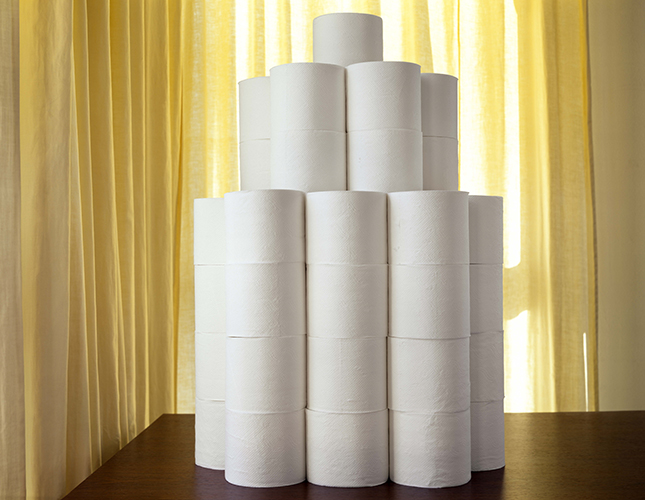
Arsewipe Rocket, still life photography, Paris, 2008

=== Toilet Paper Still Lifes ===
are often life-size photographic representations on canvas of toilet paper rolls arranged on a table top. Depending on the composition the images are called “Arsewipe rocket”, "torche-cul", or “Ass-ana”.

=== Relationships Do Not Exist ===
The pair is perhaps best known for their miniature work called "Relationships Do Not Exist". This group of sculptures is one of the largest series of work created by Gregory Maass & Nayoungim. Relationships Do Not Exist is among the more iconic, philosophically astute and visually humorous works that Gregory Maass & Nayoungim have created. The title derives from the famous Jacques Lacan quote “Sexual relationships do not exist”. They proceeded by choosing samples from a wide collection of figurines ranging from the 1950s until today. In an intricate process the bodies are dismembered and reassembled, painted and mounted on empty trophy pedestals. Gregory Maass & Nayoungim call this an adaptation method: "First we cannibalize them and then they get frankensteined back together."

=== A Snowman for Busan ===
is a public art work installed in Busan, a town where it hardly ever snows. It is a chromed steel snowman placed on a rooftop water tower of a local kindergarten.

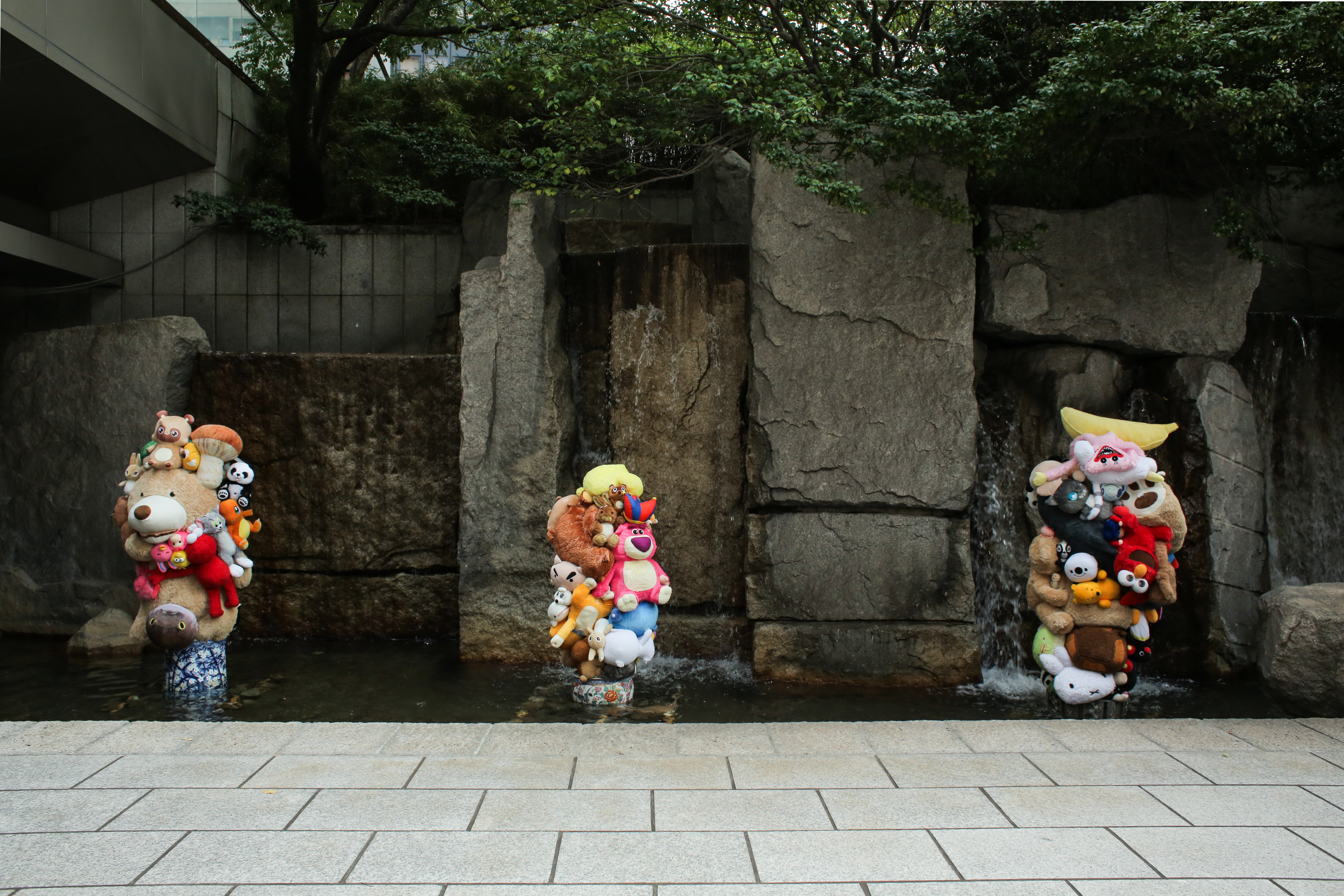
Installation of a work by Gregory S. Maass & Nayoungim for the Chiba City Arts Triennale 2025 at the Sogo Department Store.

=== SOGOLOGY, Chiba City Arts Triennale 2025 ===
is a public art work installed in Chiba, a city, which stand out as home to the world's longest suspended monorail system, the Chiba Urban Monorail at 15.2 km. The installation "Sogology" is placed in a water and stone garden at the Sogo Department store. Sogo Chiba is a prominent 10-story department store in central Chiba City, Japan.

=== Mona Lisa Overdrive ===
is a public art work, first installed in front of the Seoul railway station in 2008. It is made of rubber, toys, foam mattresses and steel frames, and sprayed over with expansion foam. The entire construction is painted with a collection of surplus paints. The face of the sculpture depicts the past, present, and future of the city of Seoul.

== Interviews ==
- Video interview with Gregory Maass & Nayoungim in their show "The Early Worm",
- "Octavianus", a video interview with Gregory Maass and Yiso Bahc.
- "Pièce Unique", an Interview with Gregory Maass about the art of Robert Estermann.
- "Diarrhea-Causes, Symptoms & Treatment", an Interview/Manifesto with Gregory Maass & Nayoungim on occasion of the exhibition "Paranoia Paradise"

== Shows ==
=== Tears Of Boredom ===
"...he spent most of his first few years at art school working with peanuts and taking images of vegetable constructions. He even passed a morphology test with a massive plaster peanut, which he could barely lift onto the exam table."

— Nayoungim about Gregory Maass, Tränen vor Langeweile, 1991

Gregory Maass´ first solo-show entitled "Tears of Boredom" (the original German title is "Tränen vor Langeweile"), was held in 1991 in Hagen, Germany. It consisted of a tautological representation of peanuts. Large scale peanut butter paintings representing peanuts, black and white photographs of peanuts, and an installation of peanuts positioned in tensegrity were on display.

=== The Early Worm Catches The Bird ===
duo-show was about different kinds of possible success in art, be it fame and glory, money and power, or the desired result of an attempt. The title derives from Genesis P-Orridge´s first recording with Worm. "In the summer of 1968, Worm recorded their first and only album, entitled Early Worm, in Megson's parents attic in Solihull. It was pressed onto vinyl in November at Deroy Sound Services in Manchester, but only one copy was ever produced. A second album, Catching the Bird, was recorded but never pressed."

=== The Handsome Tofu ===
"Tofu incorporates the meaning of mildness, nutritiousness, purity, shaped shapelessness, tasteful tastelessness, crème de la crème, exclusiveness, peacefulness and so on, which were the inspiration to build this show." It took place at the Department for Philosophy and Art in Assen, Netherlands.

=== Survival of the Shitest ===
was a show realized with the help of mentally ill patients in the 3bisF Contemporary Art Space in Aix-en-Provence, France, which is located inside the walls of a psychiatric ward. It included works such as "This is punk" and "Hunter S. Thompson´s mirror shades".

== Awards and Scholarships ==
- Institut des Hautes Études en Arts Plastiques Paris (1993–94)
- Jan Van Eyck Academie the Netherlands. (1998–2000)
- Atelier Rondo, Kultur Service Gesellschaft Steiermark, Graz, Austria (2008)
- United Sardine Factory Studio Grant, Bergen, Norway (2007)
- NKD, Studio Grant, Dale, Norway (2006)
- Lademoen Kunstnerverksteder Studio Grant, Trondheim, Norway (2006)
- Cite Internationale des Arts, AFAA Studio Grant, Paris, France, (2004)
- Boswil Artists’ House Foundation Studio Grant, Boswil, Switzerland
- Korean Film Commission Grant, Seoul, Korea, 2002
- Samsung Unni Atelier, Samsung Culture & Arts Foundation Studio Grant, Seoul, Korea (2001)
- Parc St.-Leger Centre d'Art Contemporain Studio Grant, Pougues-les-eaux, France (2000)
- Joseph Ebstein Price For Sculpture, Paris, France (1997)

== Influences ==
Gregory Maass claims to be influenced in his thinking by Robert Filliou´s "Principle Of Equivalence", which states that (Well done, Badly done, Not done) are three equivalent assumptions, and the writings of Philip K. Dick.
