= Godzilla Asian American Arts Network =

Godzilla
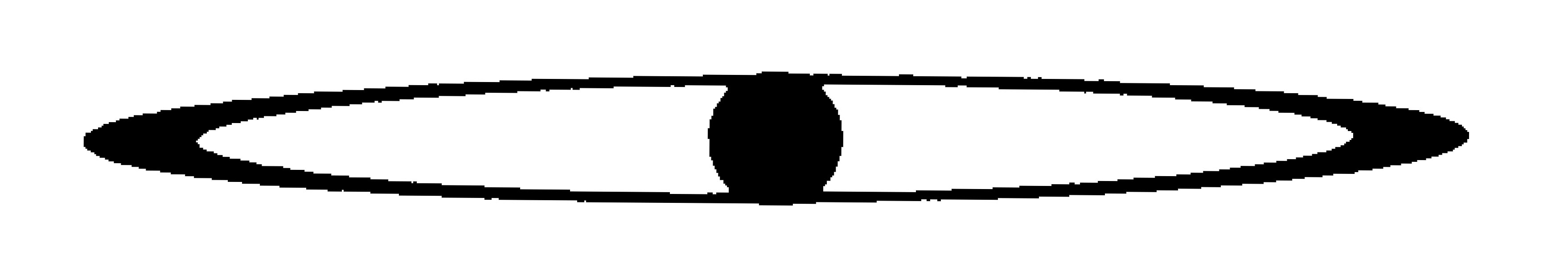
- Formation: 1990
- Dissolved: 2001
- Type: collective
- Location: New York, NY, USA
- Key people: Ken Chu, Bing Lee, Margo Machida

Godzilla: Asian American Arts Network was a New York-based Asian American arts collective and support network established in 1990. Founding members Ken Chu, Bing Lee, Margo Machida, and others established Godzilla in order to facilitate inter-generational and interdisciplinary dialogue and collaboration for Asian American artists and art professionals. The collective provided visibility in local and national exhibitions, developed press outreach strategies, published newsletters, and sponsored symposia on Asian American art. It was disbanded in 2001.

Godzilla's history overlapped with Godzookie, and the Brainstormers.

== History ==
The original members of Godzilla were Tomie Arai, Ken Chu, Karin Higa, Arlan Huang, Byron Kim, Bing Lee, Colin Lee, Janet Lin, Mei-Lin Liu, Margo Machida, Stephanie Mar, Yong Soon Min, Helen Oji, Eugenie Tsai, Charles Yuen and Garson Yu. Some of Godzilla's members were previously involved in Basement Workshop and Asian American Art Centre. Members decided to name the organization "Godzilla" after Japanese movie monster Godzilla.

The collective organized "slide slams" where hundreds of artists had the opportunity to display their work as well as view other artists' works. Godzilla also published a national newsletter that included member-written opinion pieces, coverage of Asian American art from across the United States, and calls for artwork. Because Godzilla members rejected formally becoming a 501(c)3 organization, rotating volunteer committees coordinated much of its work. In a letter to artist Dorothy Imagire dated May 9, 1991, Chu wrote "Godzilla is an open group and have no membership policy.... There is no monetary requirements to be in Godzilla, only Asian or Pacific Islander lineage and a commitment to work at championing for our issues as artists." The group's logo and newsletters were designed and produced by Charles Yuen.

Other notable artists and arts professionals who later joined Godzilla include artists Paul Pfeiffer, Zhang Hongtu, Nina Kuo, Allan deSouza, Lynne Yamamoto, and art critic Alice Yang.

=== Whitney Biennial protest ===
In the spring of 1991, members of Godzilla published a letter highlighting the historic absence of Asian American artists in the Whitney Museum of American Art's biennials. The collective chose to call attention to this absence in part because of the Whitney Biennial's influence in establishing trends in the U.S. art scene. In response to Godzilla's letter, then-Whitney Museum director David Ross met with Godzilla members Tsai, Machida, Pfeiffer and others to discuss plans to expand representation of minority groups within the Whitney's curatorial staff, which was intended to in turn improve the representation of artists from ethnic minority groups in the U.S. in the Whitney's future biennials. Tsai was subsequently appointed as a curator at the Whitney in 1994.

=== Later work ===
The group has participated in several retrospectives and reunions since the group's last official work, Why Asia?, in 2001. In 2021, members of Godzilla protested a retrospective at the Museum of Chinese in America in response to the construction of a mega-jail.

== Notable exhibitions ==
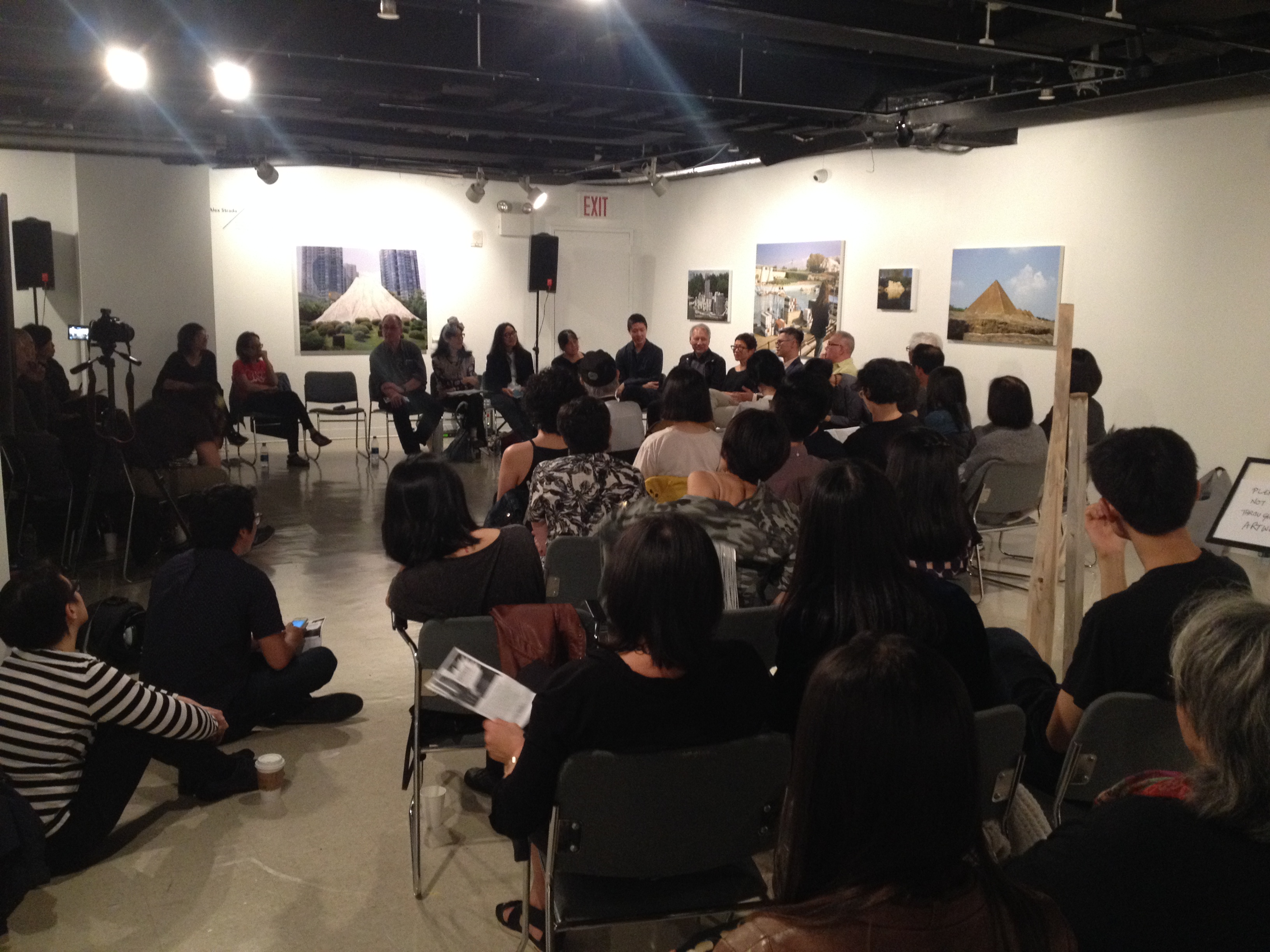
A reunion discussion in 2017

- Dismantling Invisibility: Asian and Pacific Islander Artists Respond to the AIDS Crisis, 1991, Art in General, New York, New York
- The New World Order III: The Curio Shop, 1993, Artists Space, New York, New York
- Urban Encounters, New Museum, 1998
- Why Asia, 2001
- Godzilla: Echoes from the 1990s Asian American Arts Network, 2024, Eric Firestone Gallery, New York, New York
