= Stefan Ettlinger =

German painter and draughtsman

Stefan Ettlinger (born 28 November 1958 in Nürnberg, Germany) is a German painter and draughtsman. He studied at the Kunstakademie Düsseldorf at Alfonso Hüppi as a master student. He lives and works in Düsseldorf.

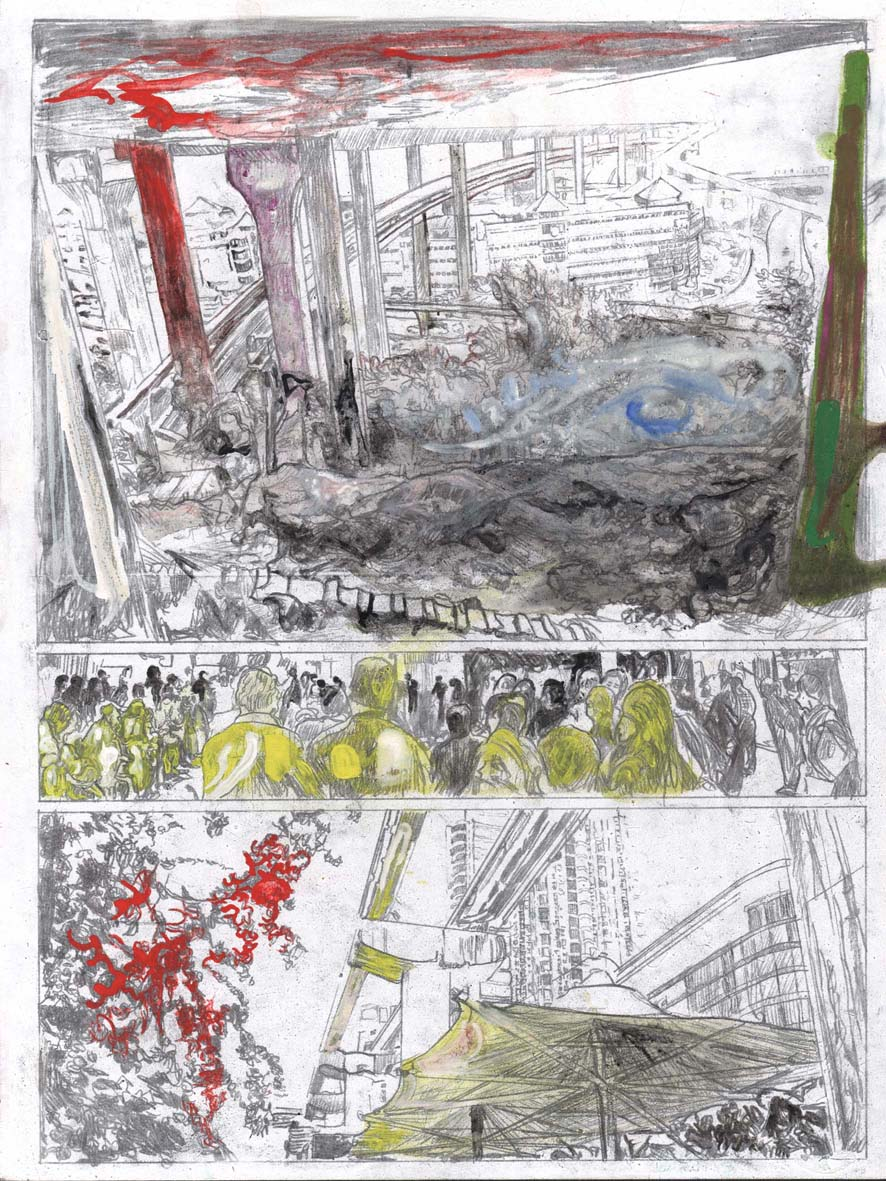
Stefan Ettlinger, A Sichuan Ghost Story 07, 2014, 40 cm x 30 cm, coal and egg tempera on MDF-Fiberboard

== Biography ==
Stefan Ettlinger studied from 1980 to 1988 at the Kunstakademie Düsseldorf at Alfonso Hüppi. He finished the Academy time in 1985 as a master student. As a result, he created his first films. He also staged performances at this time, composed music and was among others Member of AGZ (Anarchist padded cell). Other members of the (APC) are Thorsten Ebeling, Heinz Hausmann, Bertram Jesdinsky, Otto Müller, Ulrich Sappok.

In 2008 he was appointed Visiting Professor of Painting at the College Of Fine Art from Kyung -Hee University in Seoul, Korea. In the winter semester 2010/2011, he took a temporary professorship (Free graphic design and painting, Class Alexander Roob) at the State Academy of Fine Arts in Stuttgart, Germany. In 2012, he participated in a two-month stay in Chongqing, China in the context of an artist's exchange program of the city of Düsseldorf. In 2013 he traveled again for several months to Chengdu (exchange program DCKD Düsseldorf) and Chongqing (China), to work artistically. There arose a variety of drawings on paper and hardboard.

== Work ==
Since the 1980s, Stefan Etllinger painted many pictures with egg tempera. They show mostly sketchy, figurative or representational events. The image space is perceived as a dynamic whole in which can be several events from different time periods combined with each other on a surface. In the representation they act interlocking and overlapping. His templates are mostly film stills, photographs and self-made sketches. This he puts together a collage and edited the picturesque divergent perspectives and compares them with each other. The action levels are thereby horizontally or vertically separated from each other, but partly also provided in a common landscape context.

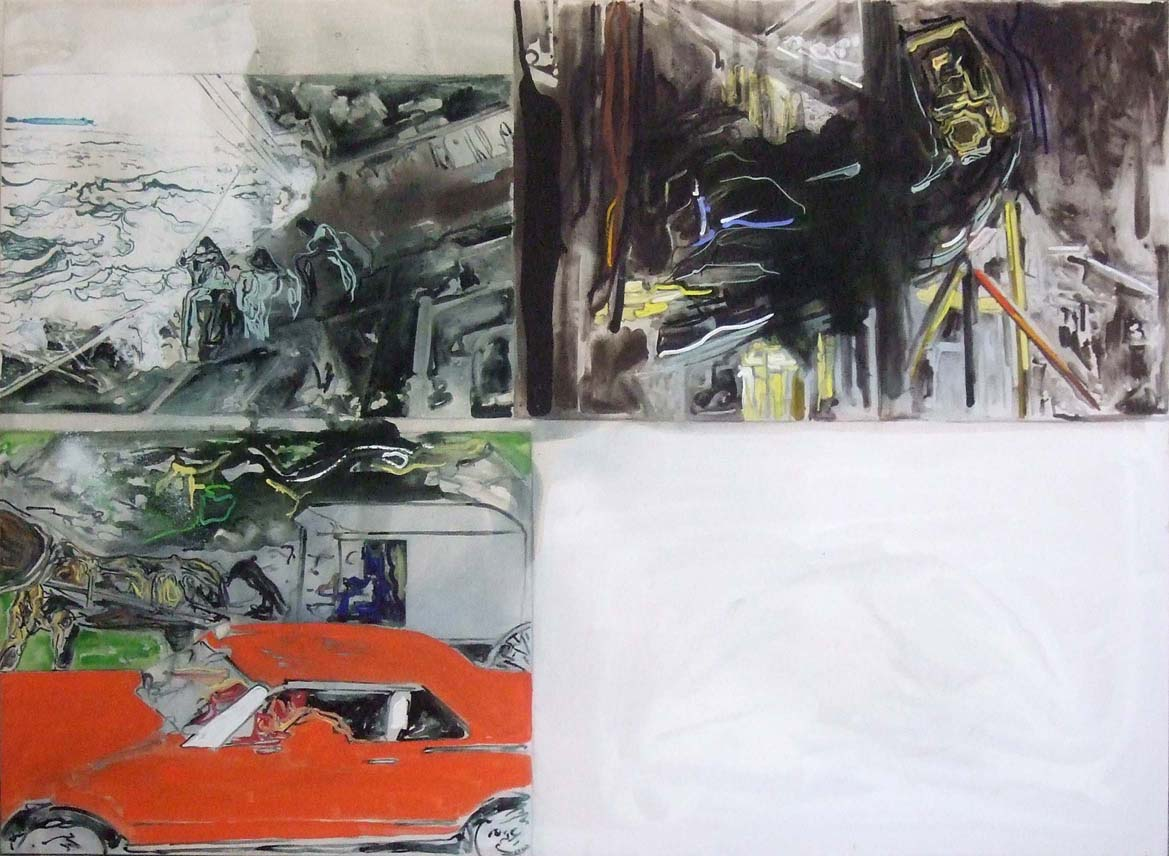
Stefan Ettlinger, Sechsundsechzig, Siebenundsechzig, Achtundsechzig, (sixtysix, sixtyseven, sixtyeight) 2009, 145 cm x 198 cm, oil and egg tempera on canvass

The scene -like moments can not decrypt the content. They remain open to interpretation and must be assembled by the viewer itself to narrative elements. In his way of working video clips, sound collages, performances, theatrical actions are included as well as his films. This reflects, inter alia, to including his experiences contradict with the Düsseldorf artist group Anarchist padded cell.

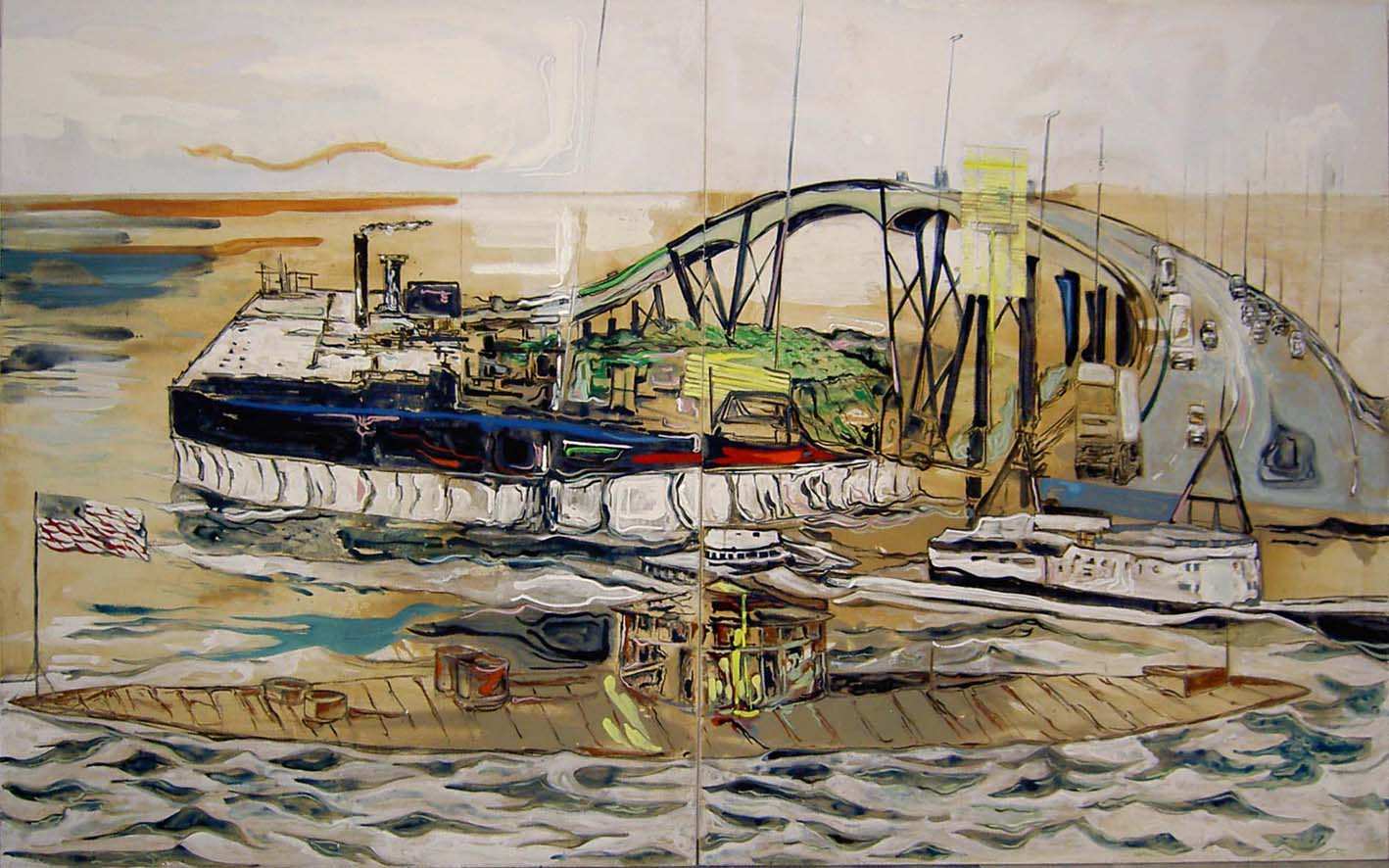
Stefan Ettlinger, Atlantik, 2006, 200 cm x 320 cm, oil and egg tempera on canvass

== Exhibitions ==
- 1983 Galerie Handschin, Basel, Switzerland
- 1983 " From free will ", Düsseldorf.
- 1984 "Hommage à Handschin - The Boys ," Littmann Gallery.
- 1984 " Luxlait ", Exhibition Hall Limpertsberg, Luxembourg.
- 1984 " Innrain 100 ", Innsbruck, Austria
- 1986 " Global 4", Kunstmuseum Düsseldorf.
- 1987 "6 out of Dusseldorf ", Gallery Vincenz Sala, Berlin.
- 1988 "Art shield and road space," Society of Friends of Young Art, Baden -Baden.
- 1988 ' Villa Romana Prize winner in 1989, " Germanic National Museum, Nürnberg.
- 1990 " The Köln Show ", Cologne.
- 1990 Gallery Tabea Langenkamp, Dusseldorf.
- 1990 Jablonka Galerie, Cologne.
- 1991 Adelson Galleries, New York City, USA.
- 1992 " Macro Ville ", Museum Kunstpalast, Dusseldorf.
- 1993 "Painting 2000 ", Sprinkenhof, Hamburg.
- 1993 KM II, Malmö.
- 1995 " The focused view ", House Koekkoek, Kleve, Germany.
- 1996 " The focused look," Kunsthalle in the house of the youth Barmen, Wuppertal.
- 1996 " All in the detail ", City Gallery Kornwestheim.
- 1996 showroom Harry Zellweger, Basel. (With Rupert Huber and Holger Bunk). Switzerland
- 1997 " Stefanismus " space X, Düsseldorf.
- 1999 " All- Over", Galerie Ursula Walbröl, Düsseldorf.
- 1999 " Snowflake Office ", Greene Naftali Gallery, New York, USA.
- 2000 "Protecting help," Schützenhof, Bad Ems, Germany.
- 2000 " Artists for Fortuna Dusseldorf ", auction, Christina Holz, Düsseldorf.
- 2001 MESSAGE Worringer Platz, Düsseldorf.
- 2004 " Here and Now", Galerie Anita Beckers, Frankfurt.
- 2004 " Running Mars," PAN Art Forum Lower Rhine, Emmerich, Germany.
- 2004 " Luxury, Calm, lust ," Bautzen Kunstverein, Germany.
- 2004 " The collection Hanck - acquisitions since 1997 ", Museum Kunstpalast, Düsseldorf.
- 2004 Collection Frieder Burda, opening exhibition, Staatliche Kunsthalle Baden -Baden.
- 2005 " Park - breeding and proliferation in Art", Staatliche Kunsthalle Baden -Baden.
- 2005 ' (update 0.5) positions to painting from Germany ", Galerie Wolfgang Gmyrek, Düsseldorf.
- 2005 " The New Düsseldorf School of Painting, " IKOB, Eupen, Belgium.
- 2006 " New Painting - Acquisitions 2002–2005 ", Museum Frieder Burda, Baden -Baden, Germany
- 2006 " Architecture and Landscapes ", The Flat a Villa Noris, Verona, Italy.
- 2006 " How do you say in Bad Ems ? " Schloss Balmoral, Bad Ems.
- 2006 " Small voice sounds big", Total Museum, Seoul, South Corea.
- 2007 " Worpswunder - A selection of former scholarship holders of the artists Worpswede ", Kunstverein eV Springhornhof New churches.
- 2007 Art portals. Balmoral in the North Gallery, Kunstverein Tiergarten, Berlin.
- 2007 "open house ", wg/3zi/k/bar, WG in the paintbox, Düsseldorf (musical performance).
- 2007 " Dusseldorf Sounds" Kunsthalle Düsseldorf (musical performance).
- 2008 " Worpswelten ", Kunstverein Göttingen, Germany.
- 2008 " Painting Smoking Eating - 5000 years of modern art ", Villa Merkel, Esslingen.
- 2008 " own four walls ", Neuer Kunstverein Aschaffenburg.
- 2009 " Moving Ahead Together", Contemporary Art from Germany and China, Wuhan Art Museum, Wuhan, Hubei, China.
- 2009 " Pamphile show," Jet, Berlin
- 2010 " something about these pictures with me ... ", Sammlung Frieder Burda, Baden -Baden
- 2010 " Influence - 8 from Dusseldorf " Todd Hosfelt Gallery, New York and San Francisco
- 2010 " Penultimate and used " music performance in the series " Number Three : Here and now ," Julia Stoschek Collection, Düsseldorf.
- 2011 " Healthier and Gebrecher ", music performance, let the artist club paintbox, Düsseldorf.
- 2011 " Group Velocity", Märkisches Museum, Witten
- 2011 " Captain Pamphile ," collection Falkenberg, Deichtorhallen, Hamburg www.pamphile.de,
- 2011 " Etaneno. Art from the museum in the bush ", Museum of Contemporary Art, Freiburg
- 2013 " The man who shot ambivalence", Kim Kim Gallery, Seoul, South-Korea

== Single exhibitions ==
- 1986 Gallery C.H.I.P., Düsseldorf.
- 1987 Gallery Vincenz Sala, Berlin.
- 1989 Society of Friends of Young Art, Baden -Baden (with Bertram Jesdinsky).
- 1990 standard graphics, Cologne (with Jessica Diamond).
- 1991 Jablonka Galerie, Cologne.
- 1992 Gallery Tabea Langenkamp, Düsseldorf.
- 1992 Künstlerhaus Hamburg (with Thorsten Ebeling).
- 1994 Gallery Tabea Langenkamp, Düsseldorf.
- 1995 Art Space Düsseldorf (with Karl Böhmer).
- 1995 Roland Gallery, Roland Insurance, Cologne.
- 1996 Gallery Tabea Langenkamp, Düsseldorf.
- 1997 Studio d' Arte Harry Zellweger, Carabietta (Switzerland).
- 1998 Studio d' Arte Harry Zellweger, Carabietta.
- 1999 Galerie Ursula Walbröl, Düsseldorf.
- 1999 Exhibition Hall Löffler Home, Gotha.
- 2000 My arrows look different (1966-70), WP8, Düsseldorf.
- 2001 Exhibition space Harry Zellweger, Basel, Switzerland.
- 2001 Galerie Ursula Walbröl, Düsseldorf.
- 2001 Term Turin, Hürth, Halifax, Oberursel, wbd, Berlin.
- 2002 Galerie Olaf Stüber, Berlin.
- 2002 SWR Gallery, Stuttgart.
- 2002 Atelier Grafe, Stuttgart.
- 2002 Museum Haus Esters, Krefeld, Germany.
- 2003 Mayor Irrek, Galerie Olaf Stüber, Berlin (with Heinz Hausmann).
- 2003 Gallery Ursula Walbröl, Düsseldorf.
- 2003 Staatliche Kunsthalle Baden -Baden.
- 2004 Galerie Olaf Stüber, Berlin.
- 2004 Project Space Artists' House 1, Worpswede. (with hot iron and Hullmann).
- 2005 Dany Keller Galerie, Munich.
- 2005 Home is killing highway driving, Gallery Ursula Walbröl, Düsseldorf.
- 2006 Galerie Olaf Stüber, Berlin.
- 2006 Michael Blättel Shop 44, Düsseldorf (with Johan Roeing).
- 2006 country Salzau.
- 2008 separate property, Galerie Ursula Walbröl, Düsseldorf.
- 2009 dok25a, Düsseldorf (with Peter Herrmann).
- 2010 Kunstverein Göttingen, Germany.
- 2011 Listening to the heater (with Jina Park), Galerie Ursula Walbröl, Duüseldorf
- 2011 Artist club paintbox, Düsseldorf
- 2012 Museum bark Hoff, Worpswede
- 2012 A tale of two cities (with Evangelos Papadopoulos, Organ House, Chongqing, China)
- 2014 Ein Bild zuviel macht noch lang nicht blind (A picture to much will not yet power blind), Martin Leyer-Pritzkow Ausstellungen, Düsseldorf
- 2015 Von der Bahnhof - zur Milchstraße (From the station - to the mil street), paintings by Stefan Ettlinger, 1985 - 2015, Kunsthalle Wilhelmshaven

== Awards and scholarships ==
- 1989 Lisa and David Lauber Award, Nürnberg.
- 1990 Ringberg Fellowship of North Rhine- Westphalia.
- 2000 Scholarship Balmoral, Bad Ems.
- 2001 grant from the Arts Fund, Germany.
- 2004 Working Artist Fellowship Worpswede.
- 2006 Project Grant Balmoral, Bad Ems.

== Movies ==
- 1983 After the war, Johnny went to Vienna (1:45 mins, Super 8 from the Anarchist padded cell program AGZ)
- 1998 Nomads (3:38 minutes)
- 2008 Vanessa Of The Cave (short version) (14:00 min)
- 2010 Planet Untitled (7:45 minutes)
- 2012 china rom country to ricardo (2:58 minutes)
- 2012 image, (3:02 min)

== Literature ==
- 2002 Stefan Ettlinger. Painting. Publisher: Krefeld Art Museums., 2002. ISBN 3-926530-97-9
- 2006 New painting. Acquisitions from 2002 to 2005. Museum Frieder Burda, Baden -Baden. Hatje Cantz Verlag, Ostfildern- Ruit., 2006. ISBN 978-3-77571779-3
- 2007 Artist in Düsseldorf. Thomas Hirsch. Edition biographer. Publisher: Peter Liese. Salon Verlag, Cologne., 2007. ISBN 978-3-89770-296-7
- 2008 "5000 Years of Modern Art - Painting, Smoking, Eating". Publisher: Andreas Baur for the galleries of the city of Esslingen am Neckar. Verlag für moderne Kunst, Nürnberg., 2008. ISBN 978-3-940748-48-5
- 2010 "Pictures There is something about ... insights into the collection". Museum Frieder Burda, Baden -Baden. Publisher: Foundation Frieder Burda. Hatje Cantz Verlag, Ostfildern., 2010. ISBN 978-3-7757-2672-6
- 2011 "Captain Pamphile". A novel image in pieces. Publisher: Gunter Reski and Marcus Weber. Philo Fine Arts, Hamburg., 2011. ISBN 978-3-86572-026-9
- 2011 Etaneno. Art from the museum in the bush. Publisher: Museum of Contemporary Art - Urban museums Freiburg. modo Verlag GmbH Freiburg 2011. ISBN 978-3-86833-076-2
- 2013 "contemporaneity". Märkisches Museum Witten. Publisher: Dirk Steimann. Kettler, Bonen., 2012. ISBN 978-3-86206-209-6

+ 2013 Stefan Ettlinger. Painting. Publisher: Beate C. Arnold / Worpswede bark Hoff Foundation., 2013. ISBN 978-3-923892-07-5
