= Karin Higa =

American art historian (1966–2013)

- Born: June 19, 1966; Los Angeles, California
- Died: October 29, 2013 (aged 47); Los Angeles, California
- Education: Columbia University (BA); UCLA (MA)
- Occupation: art curator

Karin Higa (June 19, 1966 – October 29, 2013) was a curator and specialist in Asian American art.

As senior art curator of the Japanese American National Museum in Los Angeles from 1992 to 2006, her exhibitions and research contributed to the history of Asian American and contemporary art. Higa's 1992 exhibit, "The View from Within: Japanese American Art from the Internment Camps, 1942-1945", was co-organized by the Japanese American National Museum, the UCLA Wight Art Gallery, and the UCLA Asian American Studies Center. In September 2012, the Hammer Museum named her and Michael Ned Holte curators of the museums biennial, "Made in L.A. 2014." She withdrew from the project due to her cancer diagnosis.

== Early life and education ==
A native of Los Angeles, Higa graduated from Columbia University in New York in 1987 and received a master's degree in art history from University of California, Los Angeles. Higa was an early participant in the art collective Godzilla Asian American Arts Network. At the time of her death, she was working on her doctorate at University of Southern California's Department of Art History. Her dissertation was entitled "Little Tokyo, Los Angeles: Japanese American Art and Visual Culture, 1919–1941."

== Work ==
=== Curated exhibitions ===
Curatorial work included "The View from Within: Japanese American Art from the Internment Camps, 1942-1945", co-organized by the Japanese American National Museum, the UCLA Wight Art Gallery, and the UCLA Asian American Studies Center. Other significant exhibitions curated include those at the Japanese American National Museum': "Bruce and Norman Yonemoto: Memory, Matter, and Modern Romance" (1999), "Living in Color: The Art of Hideo Date" (2001–2002), "George Nakashima: Nature, Form & Spirit" (2004), and "Living Flowers: Ikebana and Contemporary Art" (2008).

In 2006, Higa co-curated with Melissa Chiu and Susette Min "One Way or Another: Asian American Art Now" (2006–2008) for the Asia Society of New York.

=== Teaching ===
Karin Higa taught at Mills College, UC Irvine, Otis College of Art and Design as well as lecturing on Asian American and contemporary art.

=== Publications ===
Higa's publications include contributions to the International Center for Photography's "Only Skin Deep" (Abrams, 2003), the Los Angeles County Museum of Art's "Reading California: Art, Image, and Identity, 1900-2000" (University of California Press, 2000), "Art, Women, California, 1950-2000: Parallels and Intersections" (University of California Press, 2002), and the Hammer Museum's "Now Dig This! Art & Black Los Angeles" (Delmonico Prestel, 2011).

== Death ==
Higa died of cancer on October 29, 2013, at the age of 47.
