= Lynne Yamamoto =

American artist

- Born: 1961 (age 64–65); Honolulu, Hawai'i US
- Education: New York University; The Evergreen State College
- Known for: Installation art, sculpture architectural structures
- Awards: Joan Mitchell Foundation; Rockefeller Foundation; Anonymous Was a Woman Award
- Website: Lynne Yamamoto

Lynne Yamamoto (born 1961) is a New England-based artist and educator known for sculpture, architectural structures and installations. Her work uses material and spatial strategies to connect ordinary personal histories and objects to broader events and sociocultural themes such as migration, cross-cultural influence, nationality, labor and domestic life. Art historian Margo Machida writes of her work, "Through evocative assemblies of objects, a hands-on artisanal use of materials and a research-based investigative approach, the artist suggests the generative possibilities of the local when conceived within larger contexts."

Yamamoto's work is held in the collections of the Metropolitan Museum of Art, Museum of Contemporary Art, Los Angeles, Museum of Modern Art and Whitney Museum, among others.

== Career, exhibitions and education ==
Yamamoto was born in Honolulu, Hawai'i in 1961. She earned a BA in art from The Evergreen State College in 1983 and an MA in studio art from New York University in 1991.

She has had solo exhibitions at The Contemporary Museum, Honolulu (1996), MoMA PS1 (1997), Whitney Museum at Philip Morris (1999), The Mattress Factory (2003), P.P.O.W. (2001, 2004, 2011), and Greg Kucera Gallery (1998, 2010), among other venues. She was featured in surveys at the Bronx Museum of the Arts, Honolulu Museum of Art, Museum of Contemporary Art, Los Angeles, National Academy Museum, and New Museum.

Yamamoto has received fellowships from the Smithsonian Artist Research program and Rockefeller Foundation, an Anonymous Was a Woman Award, and grants from the Joan Mitchell Foundation, LEF Foundation, Penny McCall Foundation and Creative Capital, among others. She was awarded artist residencies by Banff Centre for the Arts, Civitella Ranieri Center, Kohler Arts Center, Montalvo Arts Center, and PS1, among others.

Yamamoto has been the Jessie Wells Post Professor of Art at Smith College in Massachusetts since 2016. She was a member of Godzilla: Asian American Arts Network (1990–2011), an activist collective formed to advocate for visibility and serious discourse on Asian Americans in the arts.

== Work and reception ==
Yamamoto uses a repertoire of images, materials, objects, and architectonic forms, working from the personal and particular outward to larger narratives involving culture, ethnicity, colonialism and migration. Her working and exhibition methods are fluid and often involve the site-specific reconfiguration of existing and new works across multiple installations and exhibitions.

Critics have related Yamamoto's art to movements including minimalism, conceptual art and feminist art. Her work has been described as spare, elegant, restrained and "austere but sensuous," and noted for its use of formal ordering devices like grid systems and a monochromatic palette. These devices are said in different cases to counterbalance or enhance lyrical and evocative aspects of the work that derive from her use of intimate, conceptually driven objects.

Reviewers identify a heightened sensitivity to materials and objects as another hallmark of Yamamoto's work. She selects them for their poetic and sensual qualities as well as connotative associations to use, gender, place and era. They often serve as human surrogates or vernacular touchstones indicating wider histories. Yamamoto likewise places emphasis on bodily presence, creating human-scaled works using materials that stimulate the four senses beyond sight.

Lynne Yamamoto, Resplendent, Glass, paper, pearlescent paint and historical photographs, Room size 20'w x 40'l x 13'h, 2001, P.P.O.W, New York.

=== Sculptures and installations ===
Yamamoto's early projects used arrays of intimate, crafted objects to investigate themes involving biography, immigration, femininity and labor. Several, including the multi-work installation Wash Closet (1992–97), centered on the life of her grandmother, who emigrated to Hawai'i in 1914 as a "picture bride" and worked as a laundress. One such work, Untitled, consisted of a row of 280 flat-head nails driven into a wall, each bearing a word. The first word was "arrive," followed by terse, repeated verbs like "bleach," "scrub" and "boil" largely signifying domestic drudgery; the last was "drown." Related pieces from this period include Ten in One Hour (1992), a small wooden tub containing hand-formed clumps of soap embedded with tufts of black hair, and Ringaroundarosie (1997), a wall of projecting, starched shirt sleeves.

In the subsequent project, The Long Twilight (1999), Yamamoto traced the mystery of a Japanese woman named Ayame, who studied at Vassar College, returned to Japan and lived with an American friend named Rose, wrote for feminist publications, and disappeared from records in the 1930s. The installation combined artifacts, photographs, Victorian-era furniture and a grouping of tissue-paper dolls with burn holes; critic Jonathan Goodman called it a work of intimations and allusions to love, loss and memory, "making poetry from what is not known." Artforum critic Kirby Gookin described the exhibition Resplendent (2001) as a fusion of "symbols of life, death and rebirth into a poetic amalgam." It was anchored by a wall of cherry blossoms pinned like butterflies and printed with faces of young Japanese men who died in World War II; the allusion to specimen collection and preservation methods was echoed by nine large, missile-like bell jars lined up on the floor, sandblasted with the cherry blossom motif. The iconography reappeared in other contexts, most notably, a photograph of the symbol applied to a kamikaze fighter plane that demonstrated its exploitation by the Japanese military.

Lynne Yamamoto, Foreground: Grandfather's Shed Lana’i, Digitally carved and hand finished marble, 15”w x 14”d x 12”h; Background: Insect Immigrants, after Zimmerman (1948) Hawai'i, Found doilies, embroidery, dimensions variable; 2010, from "Genteel," P.P.O.W., New York.

For "Genteel" (2007–10), Yamamoto created paradoxical objects that combined humble subjects and cultivated, white-toned materials—a commentary on both the complexity of identity, class and culture in mid-20th-century Hawai'i and colonial notions of purity. The delicate grouping Insect Immigrants pointed to the ecological effects of colonialism through a set of lace doilies, each embroidered with a different insect (e.g., cockroach, bedbug, termite) inadvertently introduced by colonists. In contrast, Yamamoto refashioned ubiquitous, mass-produced foodstuffs (evaporated milk and sardine tins, Spam and Cup Noodles containers) into porcelain icons purged of branding for Provisions, Post-War. Similarly, Grandfather's Shed elevated a vernacular structure originally made from scavenged, at-hand materials into a dignified, durable marble monument.

=== "House" projects (2011–present) ===
With the "House" projects, Yamamoto built upon Genteel's emphasis on solidity and architecture to producing conceptions of home concerned with place, memory and belonging. House for Listening to Rain (2011) was a life-size, framed lean-to structure erected on the grounds of The Contemporary Museum, Honolulu in sight of and in contrast to the luxury bungalow-styled museum. Its minimal design, slightly skewed floorboards and corrugated metal roof—which produced a distinctive sound in rain and wind—recalled Grandfather's Shed, Japanese tea houses and the inexpensive company housing built for workers. The related Borrowed Time (2017) mixed the styles of middle-manager (front) and worker dwellings (back), evoking the ways homes communicated hierarchy in plantation culture.

Lynne Yamamoto, House for Listening to Rain, Dimensions of house: 7'w x 9'l, 5' to 6'h, 2011, The Contemporary Museum, Honolulu, HI.

Yamamoto based Whither House (2015–16, Wing Luke Museum) on a photo she found of an early 20th-century "tent house" taken near Wapato, Washington. Tent houses were homes for itinerant immigrant farmers made to be carted away or dismantled and carried. In her recreation, the windowless walls were made of silk rather than canvas, the peaked roof was stretched to the gallery's high ceiling, and the corners rested on crude wheel shapes cut from logs—details intended to convey qualities of aspiration, adaptation, improvisation and mobility. While not a structure, Home (2019) also takes up themes of belonging and impermanence. Yamamoto set a simple grave-marker-like marble slab incised with the single word "HOME" flat in a grassy orchard near her New England house; installed shortly after her mother's death, the stone aligns toward Honolulu, linking the orienting poles of her life.

== Collections ==
Yamamoto's work is held in the collections of the Allen Memorial Art Museum, Blanton Museum of Art, Bronx Museum, Metropolitan Museum of Art, Museum of Contemporary Art, Los Angeles, Museum of Modern Art, RISD Museum, Seattle Central Library, Smith College Museum of Art, and Whitney Museum, among others.
