= O'Lampia Studio =

O’Lampia Studio Inc. is a handcrafted architectural lighting design company based in New York City specializing in manufacturing, designing, and customizing handcrafted lighting fixtures. It has been called the “thinking man’s lighting studio” by The New York Times. Showrooms are located at 155 Bowery and in the D&D Building in NYC.

== History ==
O’Lampia was founded in 1993 by South Korean-born Kwang Sung Lee, a fine artist and lighting designer who received his MFA from Pratt Institute. "Kwang" in Korean means “light.” O’Lampia's name is a nod to Manet's painting Olympia (pronounced o-LAM-pia in French) and is a combination of the words “O!,” “lamp,” and “utopia.” Lee's design philosophy is a modern & contemporary take on traditional structures, expressed through simple, graceful lines.

O’Lampia started as a local store in the Bowery lighting district serving New York and the surrounding metropolitan area but has grown to include international clients. Its lighting fixtures now feature in homes, restaurants, hotels, and educational institutions worldwide.

== Recognition ==
Lee's designs have been featured in The New York Times, Wall Street Journal, Architectural Digest, Elle Décor, Interior Design, and Time Out. O’Lampia has been an exhibitor in the Architectural Digest Home Show and awarded “Top Pick” in the 2012 Architectural Digest Home Design Show's ASID (American Society of Interior Designers) NY Metro Top Picks Design Competition. It was also featured in "The Best Furniture and Accessories from the Architectural Digest Home Design Show" in 2014 by Architectural Digest. O'Lampia was also mentioned in The Curious Shopper's Guide to New York City: Inside Manhattan's Shopping Districts by Pamela Keech.

In New York, O’Lampia's work is on display in multiple hotels such as Affinia Manhattan and Cipriani, restaurants including Porter House New York in the Time Warner Building, retail shops including Club Monaco, and educational institutions such as Fordham University and New York University.
