= Charles Yuen =

American artist

Charles Yuen in an American artist, based in Brooklyn, New York.

== Early life and education ==
Yuen grew up in Hawaii. He graduated from University of Hawaiʻi at Mānoa in 1975 with a Bachelor of Fine Arts.

Yuen moved to New York in 1981 after receiving his MFA from Rutgers University. He was an early member of the Godzilla Asian American Arts Network, designed the group's logo, and produced its newsletters.

== Career ==
Yuen's work is described as surrealism and abstract expressionism.

In 2018, Yuen was named a John Simon Guggenheim Memorial Foundation fellow.

== Exhibitions ==
Solo

- Crypto-Somatic Incantation at Studio 10 (2016)
- Itinerant Visualist (2020)
- Rhyming the Invisible (2023)

Group

- Brooklyn Museum of Art
- Newark Museum
- Exit Art
- Franklin Furnace
