= Sung-ho Choi =

Sung Ho Choi (Korean: 최성호, born 1954 in Seoul, Korea) is a Korean American mixed media artist based in Bergen County, New Jersey. He was awarded a Bachelor of Fine Arts degree by Hongik University in 1980, moving to the United States a year later. In 1984 he was awarded his Master of Fine Arts from the Pratt Institute. In 1990, he founded the SEORO Korean Cultural Network, a Korean American artists collective, and in 1996 was commissioned by Percent for Art to create an installation work. Choi has held solo exhibitions at University of Massachusetts Amherst, Queens Museum of Art and the Kumho Museum of Art. Choi's artwork reflects his background as an Asian American; having traveled to the United States due to South Korea's political instability, he "realized that the 'American dream' is not so easily achieved for a Korean immigrant," and made a series of works, including We the People (1990) and American Dream (1988-92) that reflected his feelings on being exposed to American culture and the intersection between cultures.

== Bibliography ==
- Hallmark, Kara Kelley (2007). Encyclopedia of Asian American Artists. Greenwood Publishing Group. ISBN 978-0313334511.
- Kim, Elaine H. (1994). Across the Pacific: Contemporary Korean and Korean American Art. ISBN 0960451447.
