= Yong Soon Min =

Korean American artist (1953–2024)

- 민영순
- Born: April 29, 1953; Bugok, South Korea
- Died: March 12, 2024 (aged 70); Los Angeles, California, U.S.
- Education: University of California, Berkeley (BA, MA, MFA)
- Known for: installation art, photography, printmaking, mixed media

Korean name
- Hangul: 민영순
- RR: Min Yeongsun
- MR: Min Yŏngsun

Yong Soon Min (Korean: 민영순; April 29, 1953 – March 12, 2024) was a South Korean-born American artist, curator, and educator. She served as professor emeritus at the University of California, Irvine. Her artwork deals with issues including Korean-American identity, politics, personal narrative, and culture. Min was active in New York City and Los Angeles.

== Biography ==
Yong Soon Min was born on April 29, 1953, in Bugok, South Korea. Her family immigrated to the United States in 1960, settling in Monterey, California. Min met her father for the first time around age eight, because he had moved to the United States earlier than the rest of the family.

Min attended the University of California, Berkeley (UC Berkeley), where she received her B.A. degree (1975), M.A. degree (1977), and M.F.A. degree (1979). One of her classmates at UC Berkeley was artist Theresa Hak Kyung Cha. In 1981, Min was part of the Independent Study Program at the Whitney Museum of American Art.

Min was married to artist Allan deSouza in 1992, whom she often collaborated with on artwork. They were divorced before her death.

In 2001, she was awarded the Anonymous Was A Woman Award. Other awards include the Fulbright Fellowship (2010–2011), Rockefeller Foundation Grant (2003), and the National Studio Program at P.S.1 (1991).

She was an administrative coordinator for the Asian American Arts Alliance and a member of the Godzilla Asian American Arts Network and GYOPO.

She exhibited her work in biennials held in Havana, Gwangju and Guangzhou.

Yong Soon Min died at her home in Los Angeles, on March 12, 2024, at the age of 70.

== Work ==
Her early work was primarily graphic or photography based; and by the mid-1980s she started to work more in installation art.

In her 1989 work Make Me, Min photographed herself and split each image in two, cutting out words such as "Exotic" and "Immigrant". It became part of the New Museum portion of the 1990 exhibition "The Decade Show: Frameworks of Identity in the 1980s".

Min's installation work deColonization (1991) was centered around a traditional Korean dress in white with gold lettering, placed near four panels that told the story of women in Korea during the United States occupation and an assemblage of Korean book and clay pots filled with rice. She used the dress as a metaphor to explore her own history and identity as a Korean-American and the Korean books and clay rice pots allude to Korean Buddhism.

In her 1992 series "Defining Moments", Min photographed herself and filled her form with images of the Gwangju Uprising, which was a 1980 protest by South Korean students against a military dictator that was violently suppressed.

A brain hemorrhage that Min suffered in 2011 informed the works in her 2016 show held at the Commonwealth and Council gallery in Los Angeles. The works included AVM: After Venus (Mal)formation, which had a table split into triangles, each with its own word written on it.

At the time of her death, Min's work was featured in an exhibition about the Godzilla Asian American Arts Network at the Eric Firestone Gallery in New York City, while works from "Defining Moments" were included in a survey called "Scratching at the Moon" at ICA LA.

== See also ==
- Godzilla Asian American Arts Network
