= Kwang Sung Lee =

Artist and lighting designer

Kwang Sung Lee (who also goes by Kwang Lee), a fine artist and lighting designer, is the founder of O'Lampia Studio in New York City.

== Education and career ==
He studied painting at Hongik University in Seoul, then received his MFA from Pratt Institute. After graduation, Lee’s art was shown in cultural institutions in New York City such as the Bronx Museum of the Arts, Jamaica Center for Arts & Learning, and the Asian American Arts Centre.

After founding O’Lampia in 1993, his interests shifted from painting to lighting design. Lee’s design philosophy is a modern & contemporary take on traditional structures, expressed through simple, graceful lines.

== Recognition ==
Lee has been interviewed by the Wall Street Journal and reviewed by The New York Times. His designs have also been featured in publications such as Architectural Digest, Elle Décor, Interior Design, and Time Out.

O’Lampia has been an exhibitor in the Architectural Digest Home Show and awarded “Top Pick” in the 2012 Architectural Digest Home Design Show’s ASID (American Society of Interior Designers) NY Metro Top Picks Design Competition. It was also featured in "The Best Furniture and Accessories from the Architectural Digest Home Design Show" in 2014 in Architectural Digest.
