= Kumho Museum of Art =

Art museum in Seoul, South Korea

Coordinates: 37.5774224°N 126.977697°E

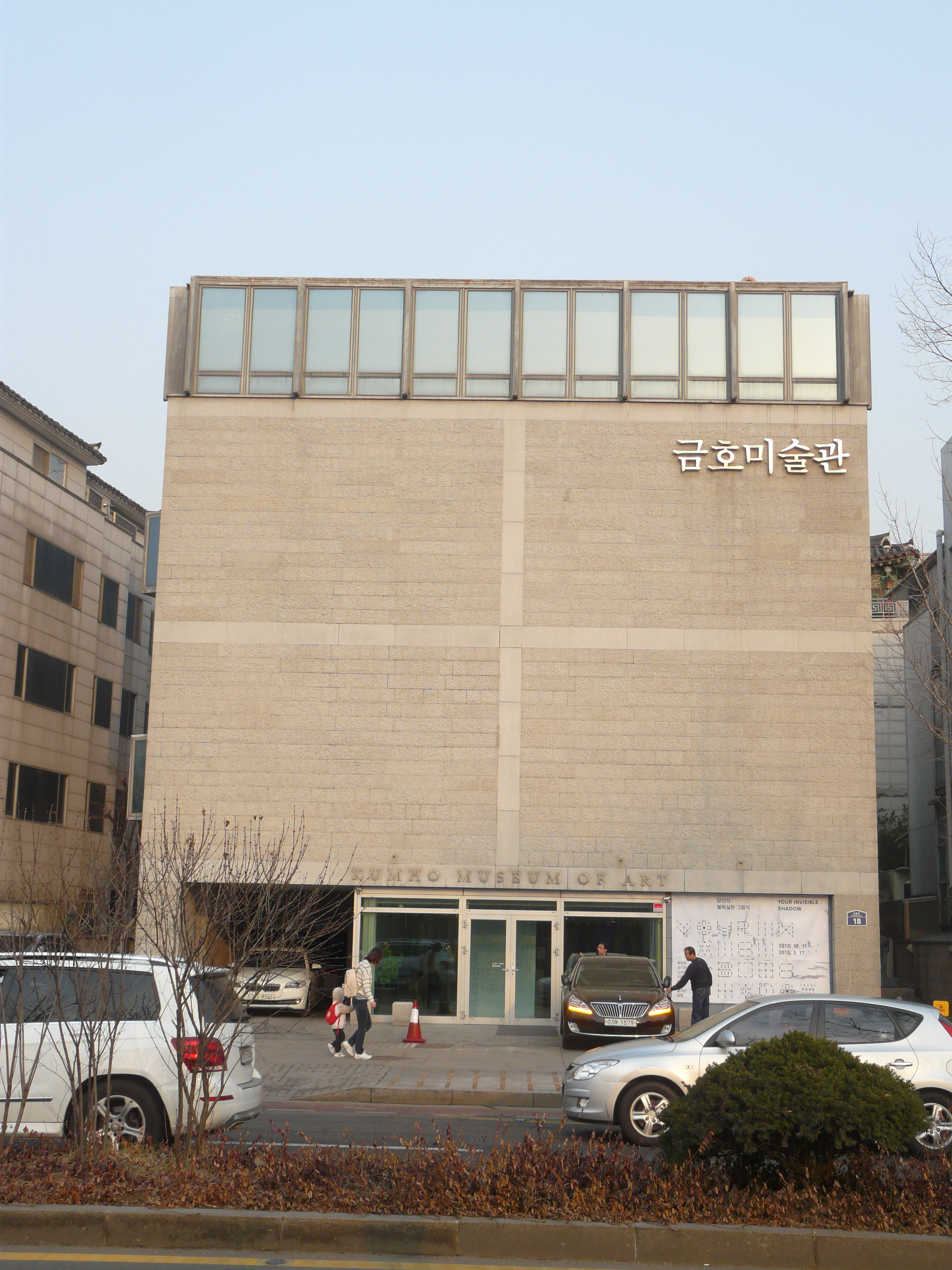
Khumo Museum of Art

The Kumho Museum of Art is an art museum in Seoul, South Korea.

== See also ==
- List of museums in South Korea
