= Margo Machida =

Art historian, writer and artist

- Born: Hawai`i
- Education: PhD in American Studies, SUNY Buffalo, 2002; M.A., Fine Arts, Hunter College, City University of New York, 1978; B.A., English and Psychology, New York University, 1976
- Known for: Contemporary Asian American art, art history and visual culture
- Awards: Women's Caucus for Art, Lifetime Achievement Award

Margo Machida is an American art historian, curator, cultural critic, and artist. She has Japanese ancestry and grew up in Hawaii.

Machida is a Professor of Art History and Asian and Asian American Studies at the University of Connecticut, Storrs. Her book, Unsettled Visions: Contemporary Asian American Artists and the Social Imaginary, (Duke University Press, 2009) was awarded the Cultural Studies Book Award from the Association for Asian American Studies in 2011. In 2003 she co-edited the book, Fresh Talk/Daring Gazes: Conversations on Asian American Art, published by the University of California Press. She was a co-founder of Godzilla, an arts advocacy organization for Asian American artists. Machida curated the exhibition, Icons of Presence: Asian American Activist Art presented at the Chinese Cultural Center in San Francisco, California. She received her PhD in American Studies from the State University of New York, Buffalo.

== Honors and awards ==
Machida has received grants and fellowships from the Smithsonian Institution and the Rockefeller Foundation. In 2005, she won, with co-editors Elaine Kim and Sharon Mizota, a Cultural Studies Book Award, Association for Asian American Studies for their book, Fresh Talk/Daring Gazes: Conversations on Asian American Art, published by the University of California Press. She received, the national Women's Caucus for Art Lifetime Achievement Award in 2009. In 2011, Machida won a Cultural Studies Book Award from the Association for Asian American Studies, for her Duke University Press book, Unsettled Visions: Contemporary Asian American Artists and the Social Imaginary.

== Recent publications ==
Machida's recent publications include “Art and Social Consciousness:Asian American and Pacific Islander Artists in San Francisco 1965-1980” in Gordon Chang, Mark Johnson, and Paul Karlstrom, eds. Asian American Art: A History, 1850-1970, published by Stanford University Press, 2008; “Object Lessons: Materiality and Dialogism in the Art of Flo Oy Wong” in Seventy/Thirty—Seventy Years of Living, Thirty Years of Art, (Asian Pacific Islander Cultural Center, San Francisco, 2008); “Icons of Presence: Three Chinese American Artists,” curatorial essay in the exhibition catalog Icons of Presence: Asian American Activist Art, (Chinese Culture Center, San Francisco, California, 2008); “Reframing Asian America” in the exhibition catalogue, One Way or Another: Asian American Art Now (New York: Asia Society, 2006), among others.
